= Mario Calixto =

Colombian human rights activist

- Born: c. 1959
- Occupation: human rights activist
- Awards: Robert F. Kennedy Human Rights Award (1998)

Mario Calixto (born c. 1959) is a Colombian human rights activist.

In the 1990s, Calixto was the president of the Human Rights Committee of Sabana de Torres and was repeatedly threatened by paramilitary groups for his denunciations of their activities. On 23 December 1997, two armed men attempted to kidnap him from his home, but were prevented by the presence of observers from Peace Brigades International.

In 1998, he won the Robert F. Kennedy Human Rights Award along with fellow Colombian activists Berenice Celeyta, Gloria Florez, and Jaime Prieto Mendez. As of that year, he was living in exile in Spain.
