= Jenni Williams =

Zimbabwean human rights activist (born 1962)

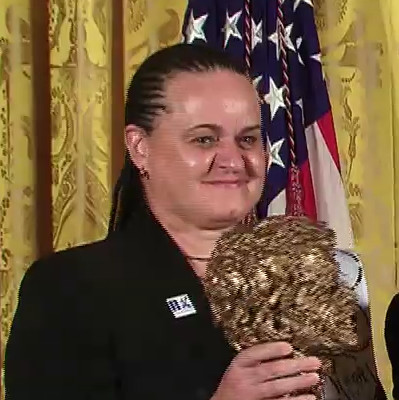
- Williams in 2009
- Born: 1962 (age 63–64); Gwanda, Zimbabwe
- Occupation: Human rights activist
- Organization: Women of Zimbabwe Arise
- Awards: International Women of Courage Award (2007); Robert F. Kennedy Human Rights Award (2009); Ginetta Sagan Fund prize (2012)

Jenni Williams (born 1962) is a Zimbabwean human rights activist and a founder of Women of Zimbabwe Arise (WOZA). A prominent critic of President Robert Mugabe's government, she was described by The Guardian in 2009 as "one of the most troublesome thorns in Mugabe's side".

== Early life ==
Williams was born in Gwanda, Zimbabwe, and was raised mainly by her mother Margaret Mary née McConville, the daughter of an Irish man who emigrated to what was then Rhodesia from County Armagh. He became a gold prospector and married Bahlezi Moyo from the Matabele tribe. Williams' Irish father was from Listowel, County Kerry.

At the age of 16, Williams dropped out of high school to work in order that her mother could afford her siblings' schooling. In 1994, her eldest brother died of AIDS.

== Activism ==
From 1994 to 2002, the public relations firm owned and headed by Williams represented the Commercial Farmers' Union of Zimbabwe. This soon brought Williams' company into conflict with the Mugabe due to his policy of seizing white-owned farms as a land reform measure. After Mugabe encouraged veterans to forcibly take over white-owned farms, Williams began to protest what she described as human rights abuses. She also alleged that the best farms were given to Mugabe's political allies. In the resulting police harassment, Williams was forced to close her company.

In 2002, Williams became one of the founders of WOZA, a grassroots opposition movement created in response to a perceived lack of action by Zimbabwe's men against the Mugabe government. The organization focused on public mass protests against Mugabe, and grew to 70,000 members in the following years. Williams and other WOZA leaders set as a "cardinal rule" that the leadership must participate in sometimes-dangerous protests along with rank-and-file membership: "We will not tell someone to do what we are not willing to do ourselves".

By 2008, Williams had been arrested 33 times by the Mugabe government for her actions with the group. Following one of her 2003 arrests, Amnesty International designated her a prisoner of conscience. Human Rights Watch also denounced the repeated arrests of Williams and WOZA co-leader Magodonga Mahlangu, stating that the Zimbabwean government should release the women and "allow civil society the right to demonstrate peacefully". After another arrest in mid-2008, U.S. ambassador James D. McGee called for her release, describing Williams as "a prominent person whose voice should be heard" and the charges against her as a "sham". She was granted bail the following day. In 2012, she was arrested for the 40th time at WOZA's annual Valentine's Day march, which commemorated the group's tenth anniversary.

== Recognition ==
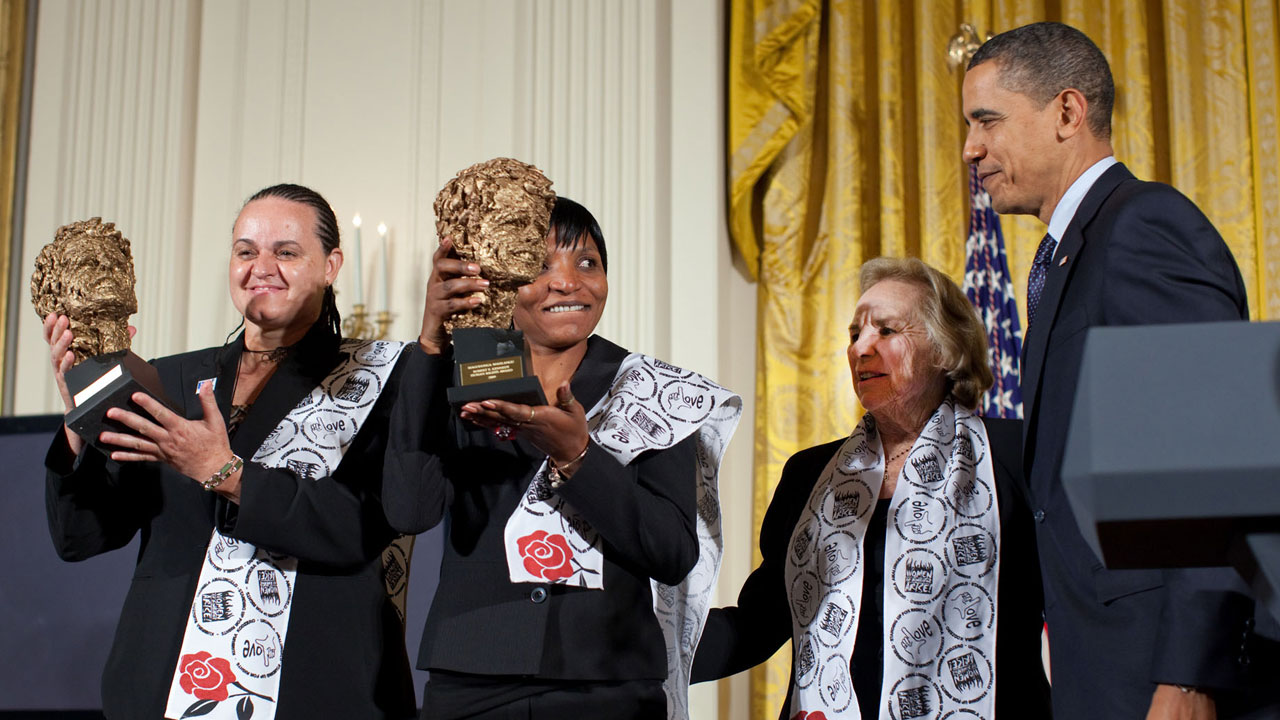
Jenni Williams, left, and Magodonga Mahlangu, center, receive the Robert F. Kennedy Human Rights Award from United States President Barack Obama, right, on November 23, 2009.

Williams was given the US government's International Women of Courage Award in 2007 for "providing an example of courage and leadership by working for change through peaceful and nonviolent means". The award was presented by Secretary of State Condoleezza Rice. Two years later, Williams and WOZA co-leader Magodonga Mahlangu were awarded the Robert F. Kennedy Human Rights Award, which was presented by US President Barack Obama. At the ceremony, Obama said that the pair had "shown the women of Woza and the people of Zimbabwe that they can undermine their oppressors' power with their own power – that they can sap a dictator's strength with their own", and in presenting the award, gave each woman a kiss.

On International Women's Day 2012, Williams was awarded Amnesty International's Ginetta Sagan Fund prize, which recognizes women "who are working to protect the liberty and lives of women and children in areas where human rights violations are widespread". The award was given in recognition of her work "to inspire and educate women to embrace and demand their human and civil rights in Zimbabwe". Under the umbrella of the German parliaments' godparenthood program for human rights activists, Marina Schuster has been raising awareness for Williams' work.

== Family ==
Williams is married to an electrician, with whom she has three adult children. Williams' two sons followed their sister to the United Kingdom in mid-2000s following threats to take the sons to youth militia. After several retrenchments her husband followed the children out of Zimbabwe. Williams remains in Zimbabwe fighting for social justice despite increasing government crackdowns. In her spare time Williams is researching her family tree covering her Irish and Matabele ancestry.
