= Women of Zimbabwe Arise =

Women's Organization

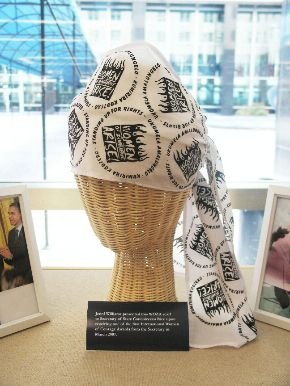
Scarf with WOZA emblem, gift to Secretary Rice from Jenni Williams.

Women of Zimbabwe Arise or WOZA is a civic movement in Zimbabwe that was formed in 2003 by Jenni Williams to provide women, from all walks of life, with a united voice to speak out on issues affecting their day-to-day lives, empower female leadership that will lead community involvement in pressing for solutions to the current crisis, encourage women to stand up for their rights and freedoms and lobby and advocate on those issues affecting women and their families.

WOZA is supported by Amnesty International.

== Etymology ==
WOZA, the acronym of Women of Zimbabwe Arise, is a Ndebele word meaning "Come forward".

== Awards ==
In 2008, WOZA was awarded the Amnesty International Menschenrechtspreis (human rights award) of 2008 by the German chapter of Amnesty International. The organisation was founded by Sheila Dube, Magodonga Mahlangu, and Jenni Williams.

On 23 November 2009, Magodonga Mahlangu and Jenni Williams received the Robert F. Kennedy Human Rights Award. The award was presented by US president Barack Obama with the words: "By her example, Magodonga has shown the women of WOZA and the people of Zimbabwe that they can undermine their oppressors' power with their own power – that they can sap a dictator's strength with their own. Her courage has inspired others to summon theirs." In her remarks accepting the award, Magodonga Mahlangu quoted Robert F. Kennedy, saying: "The future is not a gift: it is an achievement. Every generation helps make its own future." In 2012, WOZA's Jenni Williams was the recipient of the Ginetta Sagan Award from Amnesty International USA as one of this organisations founders.

== Continued police crackdown ==
Jenni Williams, Magodonga Mahlangu and other members of WOZA were arrested multiple times in the years from 2008 to 2011. On 12 February 2011, over a thousand men and women joined a WOZA Valentine's Day protest. In the weeks that followed, several WOZA members were arrested and reportedly tortured in Bulawayo. WOZA states that police officers have contacted WOZA's lawyer to demand that Williams and Mahlangu report to the police station for unstated reasons. The two women were imprisoned and released on bail later than the other prisoners taken after the same protest. Amnesty International expressed concern for the safety of group members and named WOZA a 2011 "priority case".

== MOZA ==
In August 2006, at the WOZA National Assembly, it was resolved to form Men of Zimbabwe Arise (MOZA). Men, mostly youthful, have been ‘coming forward’ to join the non-violent struggle for a better Zimbabwe.
