= Deven Parekh =

American venture capitalist

- Born: July 18, 1969 (age 56)
- Education: University of Pennsylvania, BS Economics
- Children: 2

Deven Parekh is an American venture capitalist, philanthropist, Democratic fundraiser and public servant. He is managing director at Insight Partners, a New York City venture capital and private equity firm. Parekh is a noted donor and fundraiser for Democratic politicians. He has served in multiple government advisory roles, and is currently a member of the board of directors for the Council on Foreign Relations and the US International Development Finance Corporation (previously the Overseas Private Investment Corporation Board).

== Early life and education ==
Parekh was raised in Livingston, New Jersey.

He graduated in 1991 with a B.S. in Economics from the Wharton School of Business at the University of Pennsylvania.

== Career ==
=== Private sector ===
Parekh began his career at The Blackstone Group and Berenson Minella & Company before joining Insight Partners (formerly known as Insight Venture Partners) in 2000.

Parekh's investments include Twitter, Alibaba, Calm, and Saks.com.

As of June 2022, Parekh serves as board chair for Appriss and serves on the board of directors for companies including Fanatics, Within3, 1stdibs, Checkout.com, and WeWork.

Parekh was selected to the Forbes Midas List from 2014 through 2018.

=== Board Membership ===
From 2010-2012 Parekh served as a member of the advisory board of the U.S. Export-Import Bank. He also served on the Technical Advisory Council of the Federal Communications Commission from 2011-2018.

Parekh served as a member on the Overseas Private Investment Corporation board from 2016-2018. He was nominated by President Barack Obama and confirmed in 2016. In June 2020, President Donald Trump nominated Parekh to the board of directors of the US International Development Finance Corporation, which succeeded the Overseas Private Investment Corporation Board. Parekh was confirmed by the U.S. Senate in December 2020.

Parekh was appointed to the board of The Mayor's Fund to Advance New York City in 2018, and served until 2020.

In July 2021, Parekh was named one of four winners of the 2021 Robert F. Kennedy Human Rights Award, also known as the Ripple of Hope Award, citing both his business and charitable work. Fellow winners included politician and voting rights advocate Stacey Abrams.

== Philanthropy ==
In 2021, Parekh and his wife Monika donated $10 million to found the Parekh Center for Interdisciplinary Neurology at NYU Langone, which focuses on research into treatments for neurodegenerative diseases including multiple sclerosis and epilepsy.

== Fundraising and political donations ==
Parekh is a major fundraiser for the Democratic party, having raised a total of $988,590 for Barack Obama's 2008 and 2012 presidential campaign, with $606,000 of that raised in 2011 and 2012. In 2016, he became the first Indian American to raise more than $100,000 for then-candidate Hillary Clinton.

In 2020, Parekh was named to a list of Joe Biden’s bundlers who raised at least $100,000 for his presidential campaign.

In October and May 2020, Parekh co-hosted virtual fundraisers for president Joe Biden’s 2020 presidential campaign with Roger Altman and Blair Effron. The fundraiser was held virtually due to COVID-19 concerns. In 2023, he co-hosted a fundraiser for the Joe Biden 2024 presidential campaign.

== Board positions ==
Parekh is a member of the board for Carnegie Endowment for International Peace, NYU Langone and the Tisch MS Research Center of New York. Parekh is a board member of the Council on Foreign Relations and member of the Economic Club of New York. From 2007 to 2012, Parekh served as chairman of the board of Publicolor, and he was previously a member of the board of trustees and executive committee for the Ethical Culture Fieldston School.

In 2006, Parekh was named a Henry Crown Fellow of the Aspen Institute.

== Personal life ==
Parekh lives in New York City with his wife and two children.
