= Michael Bruno =

Michael Bruno may refer to:

- Michael Bruno (economist) (1932–1996), Israeli economist
- Michael Bruno (entrepreneur), American entrepreneur
- Kalani Das (born Michael Bruno), American percussionist, author and educator
