= Donato Tramuto =

American businessman

Donato J. Tramuto
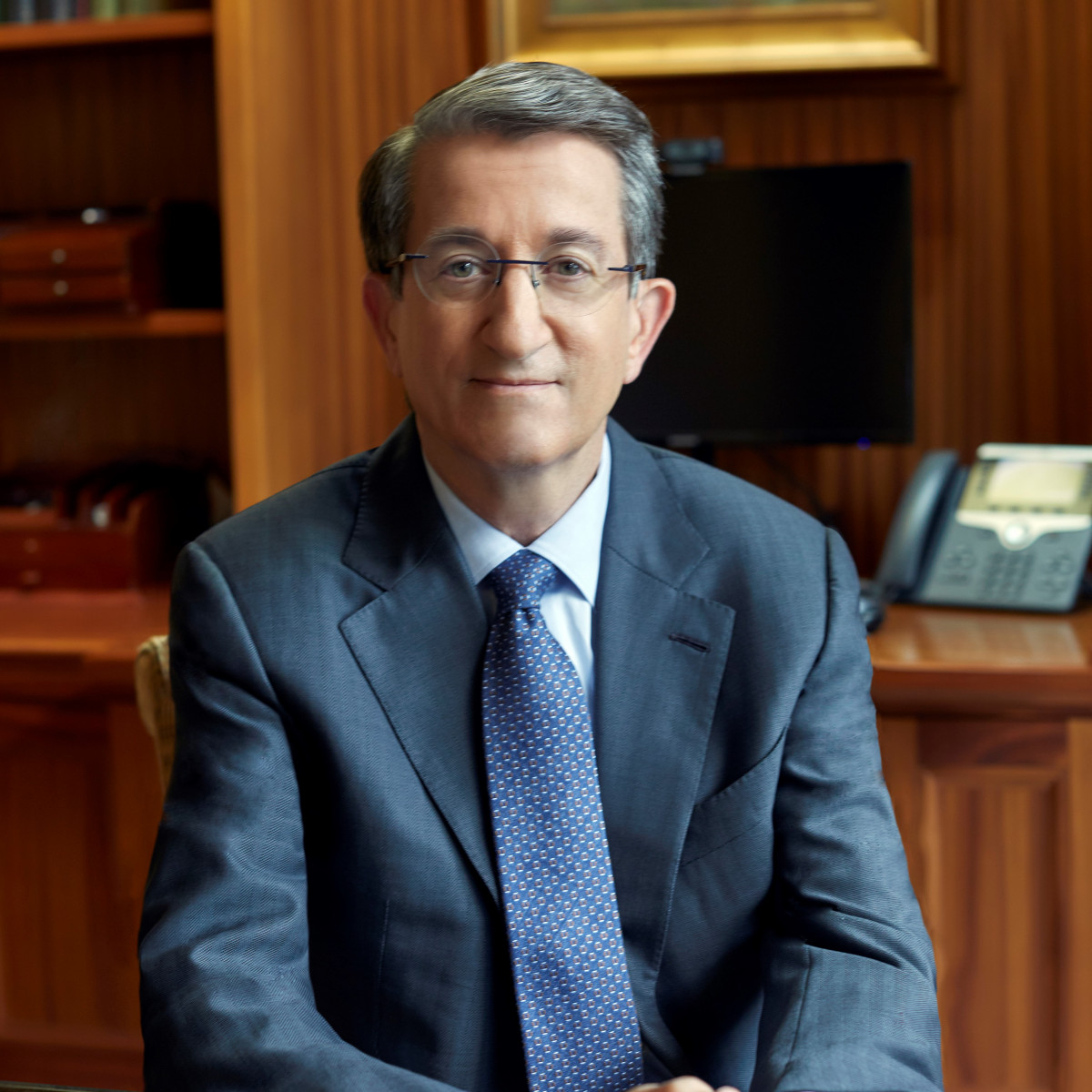
- Born: July 1956 (age 70); Dunkirk, New York
- Education: Wadhams Hall Seminary-College
- Occupations: Top executive; Municipal officer
- Years active: 1982–present
- Title: Former CEO of Tivity Health; Founder and President of Health eVillages; Author
- Board member of: Robert F. Kennedy Human Rights; Chairman of the Board - Cherish Health; Health eVillages; BioIQ; Zeel Health; Gento Health; Y2X Life Sciences; Gryphon Private Equity; Boston University School of Public Health
- Website: DonatoTramuto.com; TramutoPorter Foundation

Donato J. Tramuto (born 1956) is an American healthcare executive, global health activist, and author. He is the former CEO of Tivity Health and has held executive positions for i3 and Physicians Interactive. Tramuto is also the founder of The TramutoPorter Foundation and a nonprofit program, Health eVillages, that provides curated medical information to clinicians in remote areas. He previously served as elected Board of Selectmen for the Town of Ogunquit and has authored three books, including The Double Bottom Line: How Compassionate Leaders Captivate Hearts and Deliver Results.

== Early life and education ==
Tramuto attended Wadhams Hall Seminary-College. He graduated in 1979 with a B.A. in philosophy and psychology. He then attended the State University of New York–Buffalo.

== Business career ==
Tramuto taught for a semester at Gannon, a Catholic diocesan university, before making a career change to pharmaceutical marketing at Marion Laboratories.

From 1982 to 1990 Tramuto worked at Boehringer-Ingelheim Pharmaceuticals, becoming district manager. He then was hired by Caremark as its vice president for Disease Management Marketing and general manager of its Home Healthcare business unit. He spent four years advocating and directing the development of the company's first AIDS management program.

In 1998 Tramuto co-founded Protocare, Inc., a drug development firm with a healthcare-services consulting division. In 2002 he sold one part to Radiant Research and the other to Constella Health Strategies, which was integrated into UnitedHealth Group a year later. From 2004 to 2006, Mr. Tramuto was chief executive officer of i3, a global pharmaceutical services company. Tramuto also served as president of the Physicians Interactive Division of Allscripts.

In 2008, Tramuto purchased Physicians Interactive from Allscripts with backing from Perseus LLC. The company's technology could be used to transmit a patient's medical data to a physician through a handheld device. After the 2010 earthquake in Haiti, physicians there used it to communicate with medical experts in the U.S. In 2013 Perseus sold the company to Merck, with Tramuto remaining in place as CEO.

In May 2013 Tramuto was elected to serve as an outside director of health-and-wellness company Healthways Inc.; its shareholders had voted to declassify its staggered board of directors after the New York State Common Retirement Fund claimed that the directors had entrenched themselves. He was appointed chairman a year later. In 2015 the company announced his appointment as president and CEO, passing over a corporate officer who had applied for the job.

In July 2016 Tramuto sold Healthways' unprofitable population-health business, along with its brand name, to allow the company to focus on its fitness and rehabilitation programs, under a new name ("Trivity Health"). In March 2019, Tivity Health announced the completion of its acquisition of Nutrisystem, Inc., a leading provider of weight management products and services. In February 2020, Tramuto stepped down as CEO of Tivity Health.

== Philanthropy and boards ==
Tramuto is the founder of the TramutoPorter Foundation. Launched in 2001 in memory of three friends who lost their lives on United Airlines Flight 175 during the September 11 attacks. The foundation provides scholarships to underprivileged students, as well as providing grants to organizations to better the lives of others. In 2011, Tramuto established a nonprofit, Health eVillages, to distribute handheld devices loaded with medical reference materials to healthcare workers in remote regions of the world. In 2014 the Robert F. Kennedy Center for Justice and Human Rights gave him an RFK Ripple of Hope award for his charitable work in the global healthcare field.

Tramuto serves on the board of the TramutoPorter Foundation, Health eVillages, Robert F Kennedy Human Rights US, and Robert F Kennedy Europe where he serves as co-chairman. In 2020 he was appointed Honorary Scholar in Residence at St. Joseph's College in Maine; Executive in Residence at Promerica Health, Tidesmart Health, Concierge Health, Skyscape and Sharecare. In 2022, the National Calendar Association awarded the TramutoPorter Foundation the honor of establishing National Compassionate Leadership Week.

== Political activities ==
Tramuto was elected to the Town of Ogunquit's board of selectmen in 2006 on a write-in campaign. He served two three-year terms. While chairman (2007–12), he represented the town to the governor of Maine on issues related to education and health. In 2010 the governor appointed him to the State of Maine Economic Growth Council, which develops and evaluates the state's long-term economic growth plan.

== Books ==
- Tramtuo, Donato (2022). The Double Bottom Line: How Compassionate Leaders Captivate Hearts and Deliver Results. Tami Booth Corwin. Fast Company Press. ISBN 978-1-63908-004-5.
- Tramuto, Donato (2016). Life's Bulldozer Moments: How Adversity Leads to Success in Life and Business. With Chris Black. Hamilton Books. ISBN 978-0-7618-6855-2.
- Tramuto, Donato (2016). Quando la vita ti ha asfaltato: Come le avversità conducono al successo nella vita e nel lavoro [Life's Bulldozer Moments: How Adversity Leads to Success in Life and Business]. With Chris Black. Hamilton Books. ISBN 978-88-6550-690-5.
