= Jaime Prieto Mendez =

Colombian human rights activist

- Born: 1 January 1954 (age 72)
- Organization: Committee in Solidarity with Political Prisoners
- Known for: human rights activism
- Awards: Robert F. Kennedy Human Rights Award

Jaime Prieto Mendez (born 1 January 1954) is a Colombian human rights activist. The Robert F. Kennedy Center for Justice and Human Rights describes him as "internationally regarded as a founder of the modern Colombian human rights movement", and in 1998 awarded him its Robert F. Kennedy Human Rights Award along with fellow Colombian activists Berenice Celeyta, Gloria Florez, and Mario Calixto.

Prieto began his career as a teacher in a poor area of Bogotá. Feeling that lack of "human rights literacy" increased the abuses against the poor, he began a human rights education program for which authorities later imprisoned him. In 1976, he joined the Committee in Solidarity with Political Prisoners, and in 1990 he became its executive director, a position he held until 1998. He then took a teaching position at a university in Bogotá.
