= Julienne Lusenge =

Congolese human rights activist

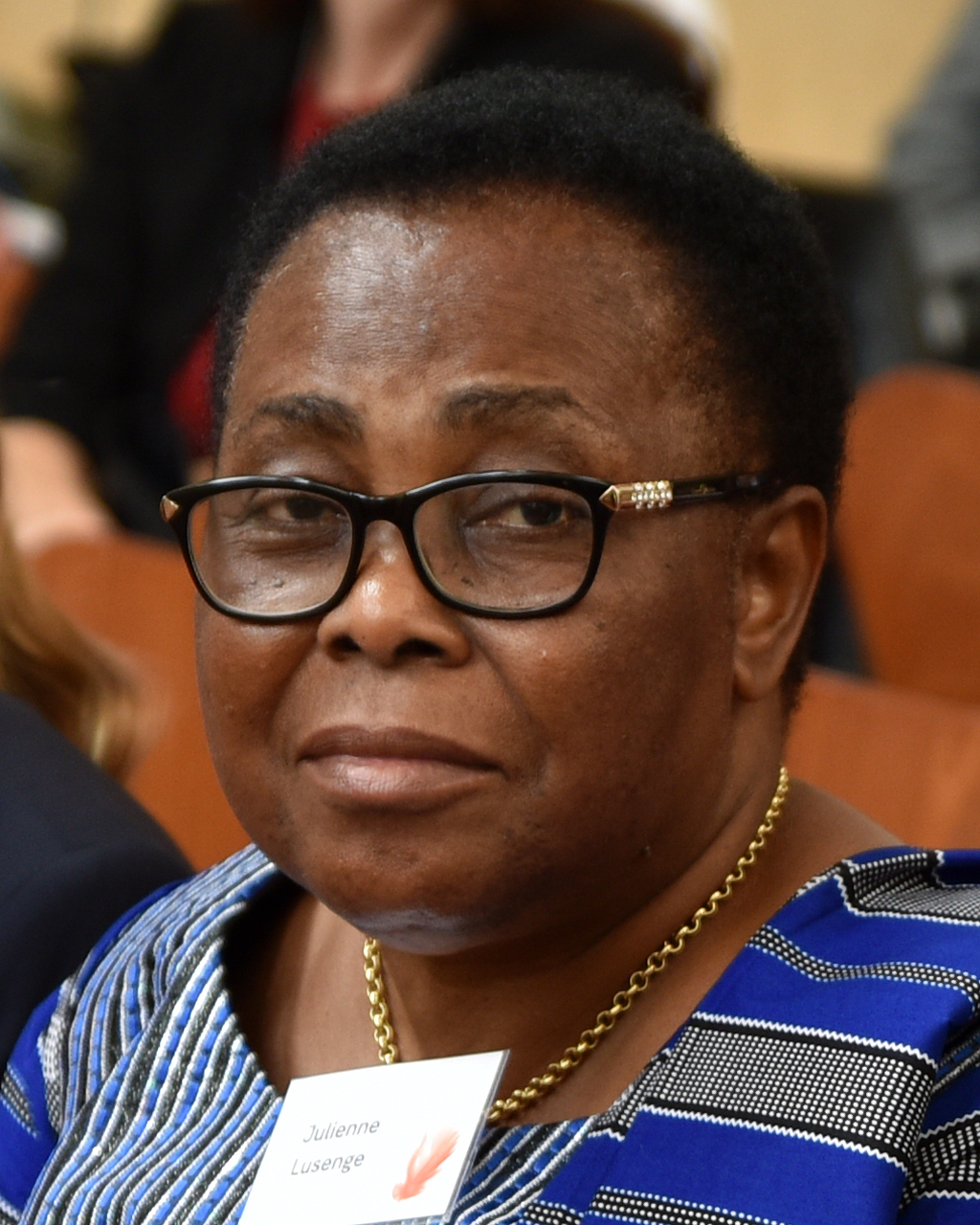
- Lusenge in 2023
- Born: Democratic Republic of the Congo
- Occupation: Human rights activist
- Years active: 1998 to Present
- Known for: Advocacy for survivors of wartime sexual violence
- Awards: 2018 Women's International Rights Award; 2016 Ginetta Sagan Award from Amnesty International

Julienne Lusenge is a human rights activist from the Democratic Republic of the Congo recognized for advocating for survivors of wartime sexual violence. She is co-founder and President of Female Solidarity for Integrated Peace and Development (SOFEPADI) and director of the Congolese Women's Fund (FFC).

She is the recipient of the 2018 Women’s International Rights Award from the Geneva Summit for Human Rights and Democracy and the 2016 Ginetta Sagan Award from Amnesty International. She received the Human Rights Award from the Embassy of France and named a Knight of the Legion of Honour by the French Government. She was awarded an International Women of Courage Award in 2021.

== Radio journalist ==
Julienne Lusenge was working as a journalist in eastern Democratic Republic of the Congo (DRC) in 1998 when civil war broke out. She was a humanitarian radio broadcaster responsible for communicating health and human rights information to villagers in remote areas. Lusenge travelled throughout the eastern DRC interviewing women about their lives and sharing their stories in her radio shows. Over time, women began describing incidents of horrific sexual violence that they had observed or been victims of as the war escalated. Lusenge began documenting the sexual abuse and publicly condemning the acts of violence against women.

== Human rights activist ==
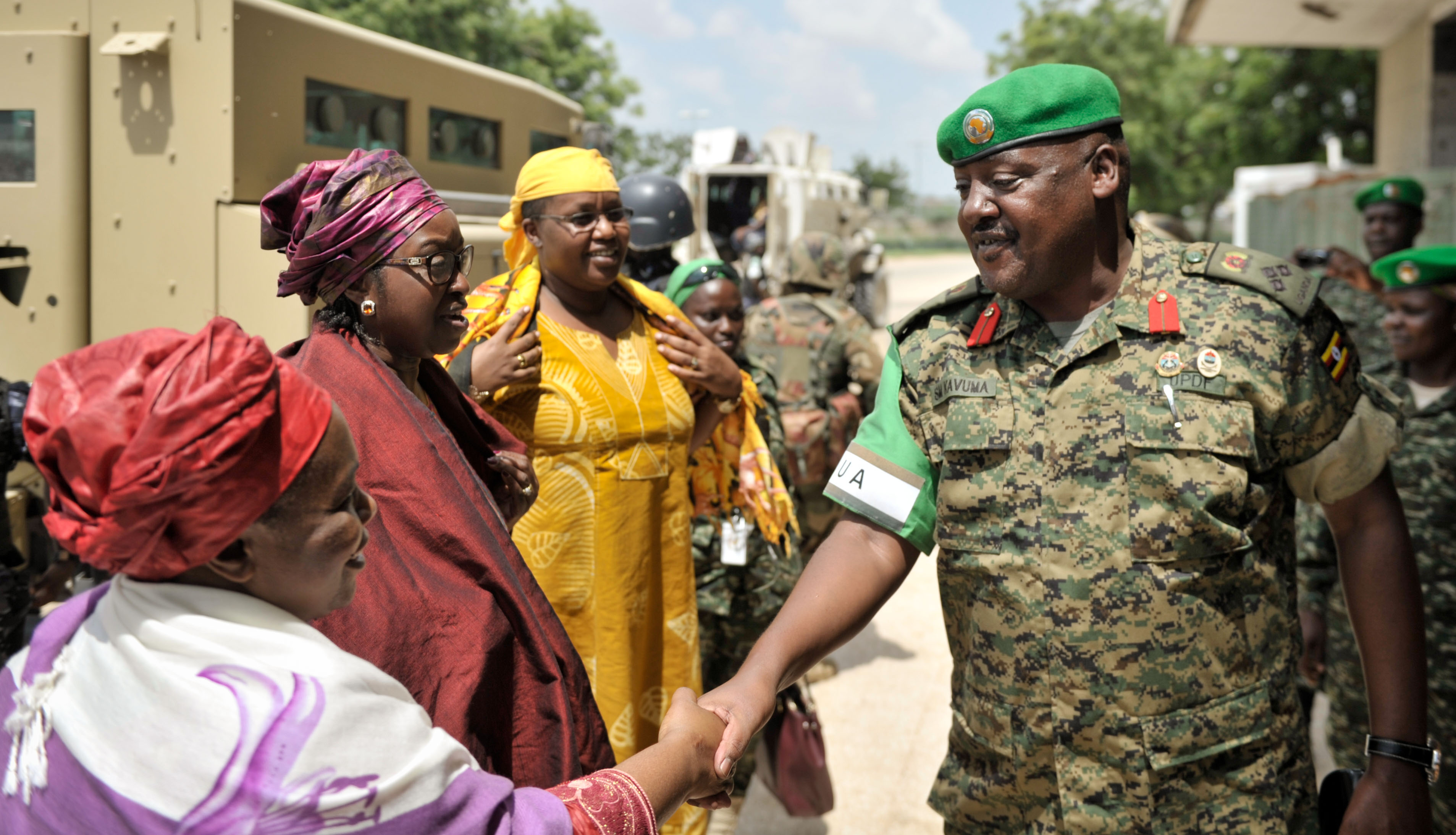
Shaking hands with a soldier in Mogadishu

Outraged by the sexual violence against women in her country, Lusenge and 22 fellow activists established SOFEPADI in 2000. The group came together to bring the issue of gender-based violence to the attention of international organizations working in the region, including the United Nations. Their plan was also to assist survivors recovering from trauma, helping them to navigate the judicial system and bring the perpetrators of sexual assault to justice. In 2007, Lusenge launched a second non-profit organization, the Fund for Congolese Women (FFC), which works to support Congolese women’s rights groups and help them secure funding from international donors. The idea was to create a financial entity to bridge the gap between international donors and local women’s initiatives.

Lusenge is a senior partner for a new project in DRC with Media Matters for Women, a non-profit organization whose primary focus is on "bridging the digital divide for isolated women and girls in poor, remote communities in Africa who lack access to information about their rights and are at risk from gender based violence and deepening poverty". Lusenge's advocacy work has expanded beyond the borders of the DRC. She is on the advisory committee of the International Campaign to Stop Rape and Gender Violence in Conflict Zones and is the Vice President of the Women’s International League for Peace and Freedom (WILPF).

In 2020, the World Health Organization (WHO) appointed Lusenge as co-chair (alongside Aïchatou Mindaoudou) of a seven-person independent commission to investigate claims of sexual exploitation and abuse by aid workers during the 2018 Ebola outbreak in the Democratic Republic of the Congo (DRC).

== Awards and recognition ==
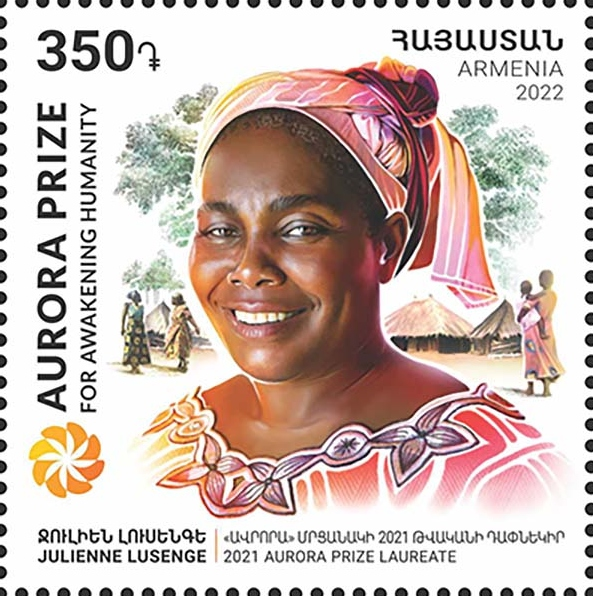
Lusenge on a 2022 stamp of Armenia

=== Women’s International Rights Award ===
Lusenge has been internationally recognized for her work. In 2018, a group of 25 human rights organizations awarded Lusenge the 2018 International Women's Rights Award from the Geneva Summit for Human Rights and Democracy. She received the award at a ceremony held at the United Nations headquarters in Geneva on February 20, 2018, where she spoke before an audience of 700 U.N. diplomats, human rights activists, and journalists. 'Ms. Lusenge was chosen for the award "for her selfless dedication to the human rights of Congolese women amid the horrors of war, and for being a voice to the voiceless," said Hillel Neuer, the executive director of United Nations Watch.

=== Ginetta Sagan Award ===
The Ginetta Sagan Fund (GSF) was created in honor of Ginetta Sagan, an American human rights activist primarily known for her work with Amnesty International. GSF grants $20,000 annually to "honor and assist remarkable women from around the world who are changing the lives of millions for the better". Along with the $20,000 grant, Lusenge was invited to tour the United States with GSF to share her story about combating human rights abuse.

=== French Government Awards ===
Lusenge received the Human Rights Award from the Embassy of France in 2012. She was also named a Knight of the Legion of Honour in 2013 by the French government.

=== Aurora Prize for Awakening Humanity ===
On October 10, 2021, she was awarded the Aurora Prize for Awakening Humanity, at the Armenian Monastery on the island of San Lazzaro in Venice, Italy.

=== United Nations Prize in the Field of Human Rights ===
Lusenge was among the awardees of the 2023 United Nations Prize in the Field of Human Rights.
