= Glen Tullman =

American entrepreneur and investor (born 1959)

Glen E. Tullman
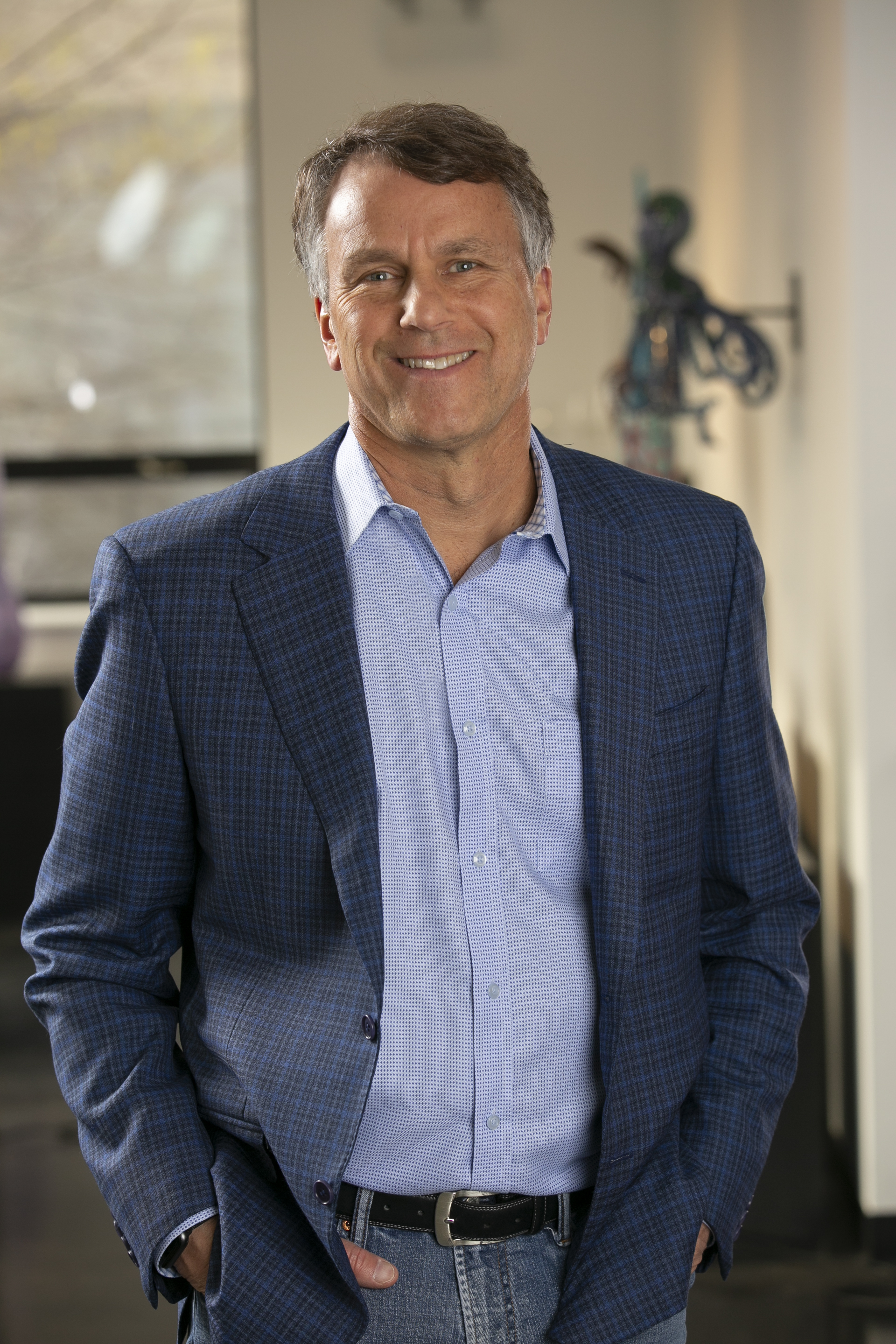
- Glen Tullman in 2021
- Born: August 12, 1959 (age 67); Highland Park, Illinois, United States
- Education: Bucknell University
- Occupations: Entrepreneur, business executive
- Known for: Founder of Transcarent and Managing Partner of venture capital firm, 7wire Ventures
- Spouse: Mary Ann "Trish" Tullman (née Heltzer) (m. 1984; div. 2010)
- Children: 3, Ben, Cayley, and Sam

Glen E. Tullman is an American entrepreneur and investor who has built, run, and scaled businesses across a range of industries. He is the chief executive officer of Transcarent and the Tullman Family Office, and managing partner at 7wire Ventures.

Previously, he was CEO of Allscripts, and was founder and chairman of the consumer digital health company Livongo Health.

== Early life and education ==
Tullman was born in 1959, near Chicago, Illinois and is the youngest of six children. He and his family moved to New Jersey when he was in fourth grade, and he graduated from New Providence High School in 1977. Tullman received his undergraduate degree in 1981 in economics and psychology from Bucknell University. He also spent a year in Oxford, England studying social anthropology.

== Career ==
After graduation, Tullman joined Certified Collateral Corporation (later called CCC Information) in Illinois, where he worked for approximately 10 years in a number of roles. Ultimately, he was president and chief operating officer of the company, and lead them to grow from $30 million to $100 million. After working at CCC Information, he joined Enterprise Systems as CEO, leading it through its initial public offering and eventual sale to McKesson Corporation.

In 1997, Tullman became the CEO of Allscripts, a turnaround which he built into a major provider of electronic prescribing, practice management and electronic health records. He was the CEO of the company for 15 years prior to leaving in 2012. Tullman led the company's Initial Public Offering and was the first CEO once it went public.

After leaving Allscripts, Tullman co-founded and became the managing partner at 7Wire Ventures, the leading early stage digital health venture capital firm with more than $500 million AUM.

Tullman has invested in and/or co-founded more than 20 businesses throughout his career, including SoCore Energy, a commercial solar panel installation company that was later purchased by Edison International. He also founded a classroom technology company called Modern Teacher, now part of LEAP Innovations.

In 2014, Tullman founded Livongo, a digital health company that provides connected devices and health platforms for people with chronic conditions like diabetes, and other medical conditions. When Tullman's son Sam was diagnosed with type 1 diabetes at 8 years old, he saw a market need for such patients. Livongo went public in 2019 and was then sold to Teladoc Health for $18.5B in 2020. Afterward, Tullman resigned from the Teladoc board in 2020.

Since 2021, Tullman has been chief executive officer and founder of Transcarent, a consumer-directed health and care platform which offers information about benefits, medication savings and personalized care for self-insured employers, their employees and their families in the United States. The company aims to enable increased access to high-quality, affordable health and care for members of these parties.

Tullman was a Forbes contributor through 2016, and in 2021 Tullman was named a Forbes Healthcare Top 10 Leader of the Decade. He is the author of the book On Our Terms: Empowering the New Health Consumer.

In 2024, Tullman founded a $100M venture fund named 62 Ventures, to invest in startups outside of 7wire Ventures. 62 Ventures focuses on education, health and care, environmental sustainability, and other sectors.

== Philanthropy ==
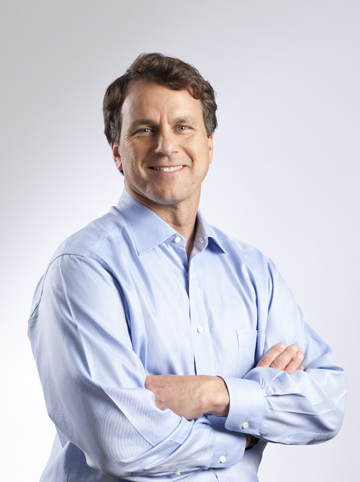
Glen Tullman in 2011

Tullman has held various executive positions outside of Transcarent. He is an Illinois Life Director for Breakthrough T1D (formerly JDRF), and was a board member of the American Diabetes Association.

Alongside his daughter, Cayley Tull, he is the co-founder of the Tullman Family Office (TFO).

== Recognition ==
In 2019, Tullman was presented with a Robert F. Kennedy Human Rights Ripple of Hope Award.
