= Stephen Bradberry =

New Orleans community organizer

- Born: c. 1966; Chicago, Illinois, USA
- Education: Dillard University
- Occupation: community organizer
- Awards: Robert F. Kennedy Human Rights Award

Stephen Bradberry (born c. 1966, Chicago, Illinois) is a community organizer in New Orleans, Louisiana, USA. In 2005, he was the lead organizer for the New Orleans chapter of the Association of Community Organizations for Reform Now (ACORN). He was awarded the Robert F. Kennedy Human Rights Award for his work on behalf of victims of Hurricane Katrina.

== Biography ==
Bradberry is a graduate of Dillard University who later worked as a public school teacher. He became active as a community organizer through the Umoja Committee of New Orleans.

Following Hurricane Katrina, Bradberry organized grassroots campaigns to support the participation of low-income families in the recovery process. Among other initiatives, he led a campaign for the Lower Ninth Ward, one of the neighborhoods hardest hit by Katrina, to be rebuilt as housing rather than turned into wetlands. He also objected to remarks by businessman Jimmy Reiss and US Department of Housing and Urban Development Secretary Alphonso Jackson about rebuilding the city differently from before, stating, "It's almost so obvious that there's a concerted plan to make this a whiter city." He also argued that the 2006 mayoral election, already postponed due to Katrina, should be further delayed to allow time for more of the city's residents to return. In the same year, Bradberry and ACORN filed a successful lawsuit in federal court to force the Federal Emergency Management Agency to resume its housing payments to Katrina victims. As of 2011, he continued to lobby for federal assistance to the area, arguing that it still had not economically recovered six years later.

In 2005, the Robert F. Kennedy Center for Justice and Human Rights recognized his efforts with its Human Rights Award. Bradberry was the first African American to win. The award citation cited his work following Katrina as well as his campaigns "promoting a living wage, preventing predatory lending, preventing lead poisoning in children, and increasing voter participation". Future U.S. President Barack Obama spoke at the ceremony, saying of Bradberry, "Somewhere there's always been people like Steve Bradberry who believe that this isn't the way it's supposed to be ... People who believe that while evil and suffering will always exist, this is a country that has been fueled by small miracles and boundless dreams."

In the lead-up to the 2008 presidential election, Bradberry served as national campaign coordinator for ACORN's "Get Out the Vote" efforts. After ACORN reported that several of its workers had falsified voter registration cards, the Federal Bureau of Investigation opened an investigation into several ACORN chapters. Bradberry responded that ACORN had self-reported the fraud as required by regulations and was assisting the process rather than undermining it.

Following 2010's Deepwater Horizon oil spill, Bradberry called for federal initiatives to partner with local communities affected by the spill. He also lobbied for "a separate health task force that can focus solely on testing, monitoring, and studying the long-term health issues from exposure to crude and dispersants".

Bradberry is executive director of the Alliance Institute, an organization that seeks "to provide individuals, families, and organizations with the skills and information necessary for them to fully participate in the decision making processes that affect them in their homes, neighborhoods and communities."
