= Cool Globes: Hot Ideas for a Cooler Planet =

Public art project

Cool Globes: Hot Ideas for a Cooler Planet is a public art project dedicated to increasing awareness of global warming.

A nonprofit corporation, "Cool Globes: Hot Ideas for a Cooler Planet" sponsored a Chicago public art exhibit of 125 5-foot-diameter (1.5 m) globes decorated with solutions to global warming, placed in Grant Park near the Field Museum of Natural History, the Shedd Aquarium, and along the lakefront bike path during the summer of 2007.

== The Project ==
"Cool Globes: Hot Ideas for a Cooler Planet" was conceived by environmental activist Wendy Abrams. In 2006, Chicago and world artists were asked to submit designs for solutions to global warming. Each globe was to be sponsored by an individual, company or organization. Completed globes were mounted along bicycle trails in Grant Park north of the Field Museum of Natural History, on Navy Pier, and along Michigan Avenue. The project included an opening gala, environmental education in public schools, and a children's contest, "Cool Globes for Cool Kids", which exhibited in the Chicago Children's Museum. After the exhibit ended in September 2007, some of the globes were auctioned off and the proceeds used to fund environmental programs in Chicago Public Schools. The project was sponsored by the Clinton Global Initiative, the Field Museum of Natural History, Exelon and others.

== Afterwards ==
On May 13, 2008, Wendy Abrams and the organizers of Cool Globes presented Mayor Daley with a check for $500,000 for environmental programs in Chicago's schools at the graduation ceremony of the Chicago Conservation Clubs, held on Northerly Island on a restored prairie. Cool Globes were later exhibited in Washington DC and San Francisco, San Diego and at the Sundance festival in 2008, in Los Angeles, Houston and Copenhagen in 2009, and in Geneva, Marseilles and Vancouver in 2010.
