= Marina Schuster =

German politician

Member of the Federal Diet of Germany
- Incumbent
- Assumed office 2005
- Constituency: Roth

Personal details
- Born: 23 September 1975 (age 51) Eichstätt, Germany
- Party: Free Democratic Party
- Education: University of Regensburg
- Profession: Economist; Politician
- Website: Official website

Marina Schuster (born 23 September 1975) is a German politician of the liberal Free Democratic Party.

== Political career ==
Schuster was a member of the Deutscher Bundestag for two consecutive terms, from 2005 to 2013. In the 17th Legislative Term of the Bundestag she was spokeswoman on human rights and humanitarian aid for the Free Democratic Party (FDP) parliamentary group. Her current committee assignments included the Committee on Foreign Relations and the Committee on Human Rights and Humanitarian Aid, both providing oversight on all activities of the German Foreign Office. During her first term, between 2005 and 2009, Schuster also served as a deputy member of the committees on consumer protection and home affairs.

Schuster also served as deputy chair of the German-Egyptian Parliamentary Friendship Group. An expert on African politics, she regularly accompanied chancellor Angela Merkel as well as cabinet ministers Frank-Walter Steinmeier, Guido Westerwelle, and Dirk Niebel on official trips to the continent.

Schuster was also active in the Council of Europe. From 2009 she was member of the German delegation at the Parliamentary Assembly of the Council of Europe, succeeding Sabine Leutheusser-Schnarrenberger who went on to become minister of justice in the Second Merkel cabinet. In this capacity, Schuster also held the position of First Vice-Chairperson of the Committee on Legal Affairs and Human Rights and was a member of the Monitoring Committee. In 2010, she was elected Vice-Chairperson of the Alliance of Liberals and Democrats for Europe (ALDE) in the Parliamentary Assembly of the Council of Europe. She was part of an observer mission during the 2011 election for a constituent assembly following the Tunisian revolution. In 2013, she was named General Rapporteur on the abolition of the death penalty.

During her tenure as parliamentarian, Schuster served on the boards of several organizations, including the German Foundation for Peace Research and the German Institute for Development Evaluation (DEval). Today, she sits on the boards of the Hirschfeld Eddy Foundation, an organization focused on human rights of lesbian, gay, bisexual and transgender (LGBT) people; the United Nations Association of Germany (UNA-Germany); and the German Africa Foundation. She is a member of the Deutsche Gesellschaft für Auswärtige Politik.

== Political positions ==
=== Human rights ===
During her tenure as parliamentarian, Schuster has been particularly vocal about the importance of adhering to the international human rights treaties and has repeatedly coauthored parliamentary motions condemning human rights abuses in Russia, Belarus, and Iran, among others. Along with Bernard Kouchner and Bill Richardson, Schuster was among the signatories of an open letter to Russian president Dmitry Medvedev, published on 14 December 2010 in the Financial Times, urging him to end the persecution of Mikhail Khodorkovsky and Platon Lebedev as well as to find justice for Sergey Magnitsky, Anna Politkovskaya, Natalya Estemirova, Stanislav Markelov, among others. In 2012, she joined the Justice for Sergei Magnitsky Interparliamentary Group, an international network including parliamentarians from Britain, Canada, Estonia, Germany, Italy, Norway, the Netherlands, Spain and Sweden. In the discussion on a European version of the Magnitsky Act, Schuster believes that "targeted travel sanctions against officials who are proven to have played a role" could be helpful if the Magnitsky case remains unresolved. On various occasions, Schuster has publicly denounced prominent cases of political prisoners, including former Belarus presidential candidate Andrei Sannikov; Russian punk-rock band Pussy Riot; Turkish pianist and composer Fazıl Say; and Ukrainian politicians Heorhiy Filipchuk, Yuriy Lutsenko, and Yulia Tymoshenko. Schuster supports same-sex marriage and has in the past voiced criticism against countries that fail to sufficiently protect their LGBT communities, such as in Uganda, Cameroon, and Russia.

Under the umbrella of the German parliaments’ godparenthood program for human rights activists, Schuster has been raising awareness for the work of persecuted Zimbabwean activists Jestina Mukoko, Jenni Williams, and Farai Maguwu since 2011. Also in 2011, she took on a prisoner’s godparenthood for Belarusian youth activist Pavel Vinahradau.

=== Africa ===
Schuster’s views on the relationship between Europe and Africa reflect her party’s critical stance toward traditional development aid as a means of sustainable growth. She opposes budget support to African governments and favors unfettered access by African exports to the European market. Schuster aims at improving ties with the African Union. She has in the past voted for United Nations peacekeeping missions on the continent as well as increased support measures regarding police and military training in order to help African efforts to build up their own security structures, such as in Somalia (2008 and 2009), Sudan (2009), Darfur/Sudan (2007, 2008 and 2011), Democratic Republic of Congo (2011), South Sudan (2012), and Mali (2013). She was one of the initiators of the German government’s coordinated concept for African policies with a focus on topics rather than on regions.

=== Arms control ===
Schuster has been supportive of the Control Arms Campaign's efforts to create an Arms Trade Treaty as well as of Handicap International's fight against land mine. She supported the move by Germany and other nations to place disarmament high in the strategic concept agreed upon during NATO's 2010 Lisbon summit.
