= Natalia Taubina =

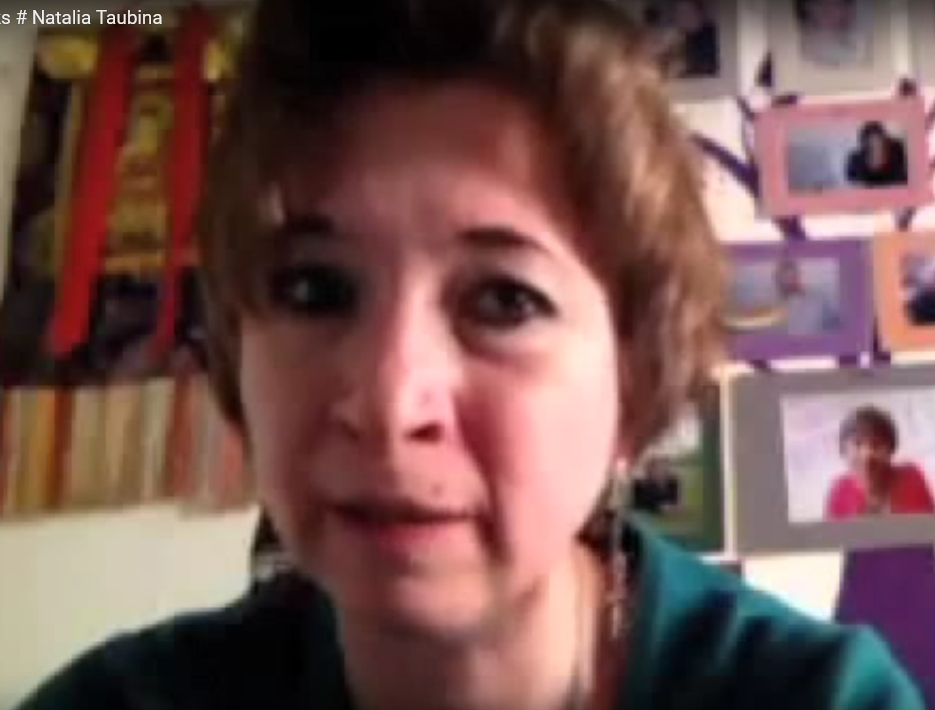
Natalia Taubina

Natalia Evgenyeva Taubina (Russian: Наталья Евгеньевна Таубина) is a human rights activist.

She was the Director at the Russian Research Center for Human Rights and the Foundation for Civil Society. She is the head of Public Verdict which helps of victims of police abuse. She was awarded the Human Rights Watch's Alison Des Forges Award for Extraordinary Activism. She was also awarded the Robert F. Kennedy Human Rights Award for her work.
