= Maximilienne Ngo Mbe =

Cameroonian human rights campaigner

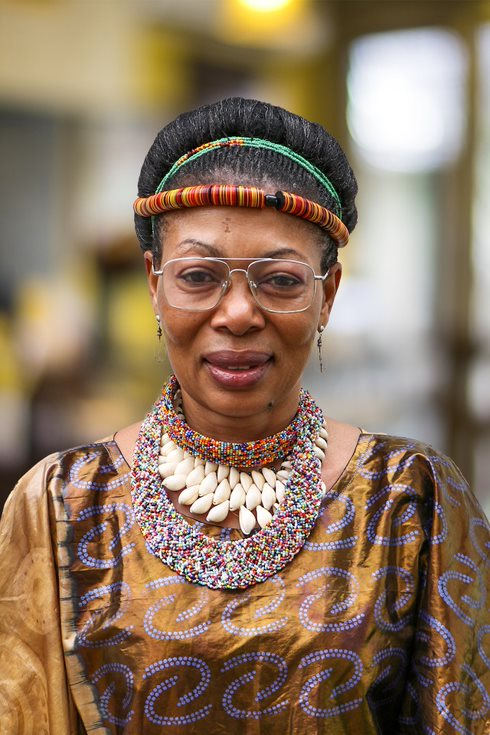
- in 2021
- Born: 1972
- Occupation: human-rights campaigner
- Known for: leading the Réseau des Défenseurs des Droits Humains en Afrique Centrale (REDHAC)

Maximilienne Chantal Ngo Mbe (born 1972) is a Cameroonian human-rights campaigner. She leads the Réseau des Défenseurs des Droits Humains en Afrique Centrale (REDHAC). She was given the International Women of Courage Award in 2021.

== Life ==
She has led the Cameroon-based Network of Human Rights Defenders of Central Africa (Réseau de Défenseurs des Droits Humains de l’Afrique Centrale) (REDHAC) since 2010. She and her organisation are based in Douala in Cameroon. REDHAC covers eight countries of Central Africa namely the Democratic Republic of Congo, Cameroon, Chad, Gabon, Central African Republic, the Republic of Congo, Equatorial Guinea and São Tomé and Príncipe.

She is the treasurer of the African Democracy Network and she is on the board of the Pan African Human Rights Defenders Network. This network champions the protection of other Human Rights Defenders.

She has worked as an Elections Observer and a Consultant to the African Union.

In 2013 she moved her children to live in France to protect them. She faces criticism for having "sold out to Westerners" and since 2017 she has been harassed on social media.

In February 2020 she called out the government's version of events following the Ngarbuh massacre when 22 civilians were killed by soldiers.

In 2021 she was one of fourteen women chosen to receive an International Women of Courage Award. The ceremony was virtual due to the ongoing COVID-19 pandemic and it included an address by First Lady, Jill Biden. After the award ceremony all of the fourteen awardees would be able to take part in a virtual exchange as part an International Visitor Leadership Program. Unusually another seven women were included in the awards who had died in Afghanistan.

In 2022 she received the Robert F. Kennedy Human Rights Award.

On 4 August 2025, a trial began at the Douala-Bonanjo Court of First Instance against Ngo Mbe and Alice Nkom on charges of "breaking seals", "rebellion" and "refusal to comply with a summons".
