= Rebecca Masika Katsuva =

Congolese activist (1966–2016)

Rebecca Masika Katsuva (26 May 1966 – 2 February 2016) was an activist and a survivor of sexual assault from the Democratic Republic of Congo.

She founded the Association des Personnes Desherites Unies pour le Development (APDUD) and defended the rights of survivors including children in the South Kivu region of the DRC.

== Personal life ==
During the Second Congo War in 1999, attackers killed Katsuva's husband and sexually assaulted her and her daughters, then 12 and 14. Her daughters became pregnant as a result of the assaults, and Katsuva and her daughters were forced to leave their home after being disowned by her husband's relatives. Katsuva was raped 4 times by soldiers and members of militia. In January 2009, former insurgents, newly integrated into the Congo military, raped Katsuva for the fourth time. The former insurgents said they attacked Katsuva because she had accused them of assaulting women. She has adopted 18 children, born of mothers who were sexually assaulted.

== Career ==
In 1999, Katsuva founded a centre d'ecoute, also known as a listening house, in her home in the DRC, located in an isolated and conflict-ridden area. She renamed her center the Association des Personnes Desherites Unies pour le Development (APDUD) in 2002. The center serves as a shelter for women to recover from violent acts and provides medical help, and currently consists of almost 50 houses for women to live in. Katsuva's center is currently helping approximately 180 women. In the past decade, she has helped over 6,000 rape survivors.

== Awards ==
Katsuva received the 2010 Ginetta Sagan Award for Women's and Children's Rights from Amnesty International USA, announced at the organization's annual gathering in New Orleans, 9–11 April 2010.

== Death ==
Katsuva succumbed to malaria-related complications on 2 February 2016 at the age of 49.
