= The Price of Inequality =

2012 nonfiction book by Joseph Stiglitz

The Price of Inequality: How Today's Divided Society Endangers Our Future
- Author: Joseph Stiglitz
- Language: English
- Genre: Nonfiction
- Publisher: W.W. Norton & Company
- Publication date: 2012
- Publication place: United States
- Media type: Print (Hardcover and Paperback)
- Pages: 560 pp
- ISBN: 978-0-393-34506-3 (0-393-34506-8)

The Price of Inequality: How Today's Divided Society Endangers Our Future is a 2012 book by Joseph Stiglitz that deals with income inequality in the United States. He attacks the growing wealth disparity and the effects it has on the economy at large.

== Background ==
Stiglitz is a Nobel Prize–winning economist who teaches at Columbia University. He wrote The Price of Inequality during uprisings in Tunisia, Libya, and Egypt and the height of the Occupy movement in the United States.

== Synopsis ==
Stiglitz argues that inequality is self-perpetuating, that it is produced by the vast amount of political power the wealthy hold to control legislative and regulatory activity. He does not believe that globalization and technological changes are at the heart of differences in wealth in the U.S. "While there may be underlying economic forces at play,” he writes, “politics have shaped the market, and shaped it in ways that advantage the top at the expense of the rest.” Stiglitz blames rent-seeking for causing the inequality, with the wealthy using their power to shape monopolies, incur favorable treatment by the government, and pay low taxes. The end result is not only morally wrong but also hurts the productivity in the economy.

Stiglitz criticizes many conservative commentators who believe free markets are the solution by pointing out that reducing the estate tax and deregulating campaign contributions act to restrict competition and give corporations undue power in politics. While he promotes the idea that a free market is good for society if it is competitive, he states that the government needs to regulate it to be beneficial. If that doesn't happen, the powerful corporations will use leverage to profit at the expense of the majority. According to Stiglitz, concentrating market power in too few hands is just as bad as excessive regulation.

== Reception ==
Writing in the New York Times, journalism professor Thomas B. Edsall called the book "the single most comprehensive counterargument to both Democratic neoliberalism and Republican laissez-faire theories." Edsall added that "Stiglitz may prove most prescient when he warns of a society governed by 'rules of the game that weaken the bargaining strength of workers vis-à-vis capital.' A review in The Economist was mainly positive, noting that "Stiglitz is (mostly) skilled at making his argument." However, the reviewer wrote, "Mr Stiglitz's argument would benefit, however, from a better sense of history and geography," and criticized his reference to the low inequality of the 1950s to 1980s as an outlier in the broad sweep of American history. "Whether or not he has the right answers, Mr Stiglitz is surely right to focus on the issue, the reviewer concluded. Yvonne Roberts of The Observer called the book "a powerful plea for the implementation of what Alexis de Tocqueville termed "self-interest properly understood"."

The book received the Robert F. Kennedy Center for Justice and Human Rights 2013 Book Award.
