= Mangala Sharma =

Bhutanese human and women's rights activist

- Born: 1969 (age 55–56); Tsirang District, Bhutan
- Known for: Winner of Ginetta Sagan Fund Award in 1997

Mangala Sharma (born 1969 in Tsirang, Bhutan) is a human and women's rights activist and the first winner of the Ginetta Sagan Fund Award in 1997. She was exiled from the country in March 1992 (Note: Some sources say she fled with her husband and child in 1990) after being outspoken against the government's "One Nation, One People" policy and their discrimination against ethnic minorities, known as Lhotshampas. Since her exile, she has formed the Bhutanese Refugees Aid for Victims of Violence (BRAVE), a self-help organization dedicated to assisting affected refugees from Bhutan. BRAVE facilitates counseling and training in all eight of the Bhutanese refugee camps in Nepal. In 1995 Sharma took some of the women refugees to Beijing, China to the International Women Conference. There she got help from the United States Government, the United Nations and the Australian Government.

Sharma was granted asylum and moved to the United States in 2000 and started working for the Refugee Women Network based in Georgia. She moved to Roseville, Minnesota in November 2007, where she started the Nirvana Center that assists resettled families.

== See also ==
- Human rights in Bhutan
- Women in Bhutan
