= Mohammed Ahmed Abdallah =

Sudanese physician and human rights activist

- Born: c. 1953; Marrah Mountains, Darfur, Sudan
- Occupations: physician, professor
- Organization: Amel Center for the Treatment & Rehabilitation of Victims of Torture in Darfur
- Known for: human rights activism during War in Darfur
- Awards: Robert F. Kennedy Human Rights Award (2007)

Mohammed Ahmed Abdallah (born c. 1953) is a Sudanese physician and human rights activist.

== Biography/Education ==
A member of the Fur people, he is from the Marrah Mountains in Central Darfur. As a boy, he walked three days to reach his middle school, and five days to reach his high school. He then attended medical school at the University of Khartoum, graduating in 1976. The first physician from his area, he later constructed a medical network throughout Darfur to report rapes and other violence. He became a medical professor at Darfur's Al Fashir University and acted as director of the Amel Center for the Treatment & Rehabilitation of Victims of Torture in Darfur during the War in Darfur.

== Career ==
Abdallah served as a delegate to peace negotiations between 33 Darfur tribes in 1989. At the beginning of the Darfur crisis in 2003, he again served as a peace delegate.

== Award ==
In 2007, he was awarded the Robert F. Kennedy Human Rights Award for being "steadfast in his efforts to rectify the region's human rights crisis through serving victims of torture and providing leadership in the movement for peace." The award came with a US$35,000 cash prize as well as a five-year partnership with the U.S.-based organization Physicians for Human Rights. In accepting the prize, Abdallah stated his desire to act not only as a physician, but also a hakim (the Arabic word for doctor):

The role of the Hakim is not only to treat the patients but to protect his community... In Darfur, my role is not just that of a doctor, but someone who must work to protect the community, uphold the human rights of the people of Darfur and work towards peace.

== Policy Disagreement ==
In 2009, Abdallah criticized the policy of U.S. President Barack Obama toward Sudan, stating that though the situation in Darfur was worsening, the U.S. government still lacked a "coherent policy" for the region. Ahmad argued that a regional approach including Chad, Egypt, Libya, and the Central African Republic was the only way to find a long-term solution to the ongoing crisis.
