= Beatrice Mukansinga =

Rwandan women's rights activist

- Occupation: women's rights activist
- Organisation(s): MBWIRANDUMVA; Barakabaho Foundation
- Known for: Mukansinga founded the non-profit organization MBWIRANDUMVA ("Speak, I am Listening") in 1996.

Beatrice Mukansinga is a Rwandan women's rights activist who focuses on women affected by the Rwanda genocide.

== Biography ==
She left Rwanda during the genocide and moved to Kenya. When she returned to Rwanda from Kenya in 1995, less than a year after the genocide, her family members including her parents and six brothers were also murdered during the genocide in 1994.

== Career ==
We teach the women to forgive but not to forget.
–Beatrice Mukansinga

She joined the social welfare charity organisation Barakabaho Foundation in 1995 after returning to Rwanda. She began working with the organisation providing humanitarian assistance for the female genocide survivors.

She later founded the non profit organisation MBWIRA NDUMVA (Speak, I Am Listening) in 1996 as a co-organisation affiliated to Barakabaho Foundation. She initiated the organisation in order to support and provide guidance to the orphaned and raped women who were displaced due to the Rwandan genocide in 1994, encouraging and convincing women who were raped during the genocide to raise their babies instead of abandoning the children. She was awarded the Ginetta Sagan Fund Award by Amnesty International in 1998 in recognition of her humanitarian assistance to the survivors of Rwandan genocide.

In August 2021, she was listed as one of the seven African women activists who deserve a Wikipedia article by the Global Citizen, an international organisation and advocacy organisation.
