= Berenice Celeita =

Colombian human rights activist

Berenice Celeita Alayon
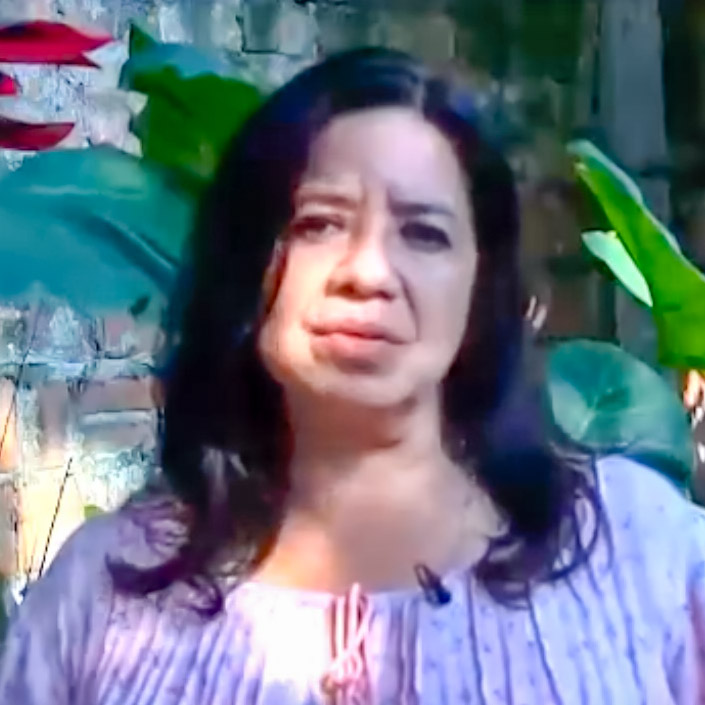
- Celeita in 2018
- Occupation: human rights activist
- Organization: Asociacion Para la Investigacion y Accion Social
- Awards: Robert F. Kennedy Human Rights Award (1998)

Berenice Celeita Alayon (sometimes spelled 'Celeyta') is a Colombian human rights activist. She is the president of the Asociacion Para la Investigacion y Accion Social (NOMADESC), which investigates regional human rights abuses. In 1998, she won the Robert F. Kennedy Human Rights Award along with fellow Colombian activists Gloria Florez, Jaime Prieto, and Mario Calixto.

Celeita attributes the beginning of her activism in human rights to the 1985 Palace of Justice siege, in which M-19 guerrillas took the Supreme Court of Justice of Colombia hostage, killing 11 of its 25 justices. Celeita was at the time a freshman in college, and had several professors among the dead.

She later founded NOMADESC, which is based in Valle del Cauca province in southern Colombia. NOMADESC offers human rights training courses which graduate 150 people a year to return to local communities for advocacy and development. The organization also reports on human rights violations related to the mining of gold, nickel, and uranium, as well as petroleum drilling. NOMADESC is a part of people's congress which started during 2004 to 2008.

The Robert F. Kennedy Center for Justice and Human Rights has stated that in 2004, Celeita was one of 175 human rights activists and unionists targeted by the Colombian government for assassination in "Operation Dragon". A colonel and two majors of the Colombian Army were arrested in September 2011 for the attacks.

She received death threats again in 2010 via SMS after attending a ceremony for Human Rights Day, causing Front Line to issue an alert on her behalf.
