= Abel Barrera Hernández =

Mexican anthropologist

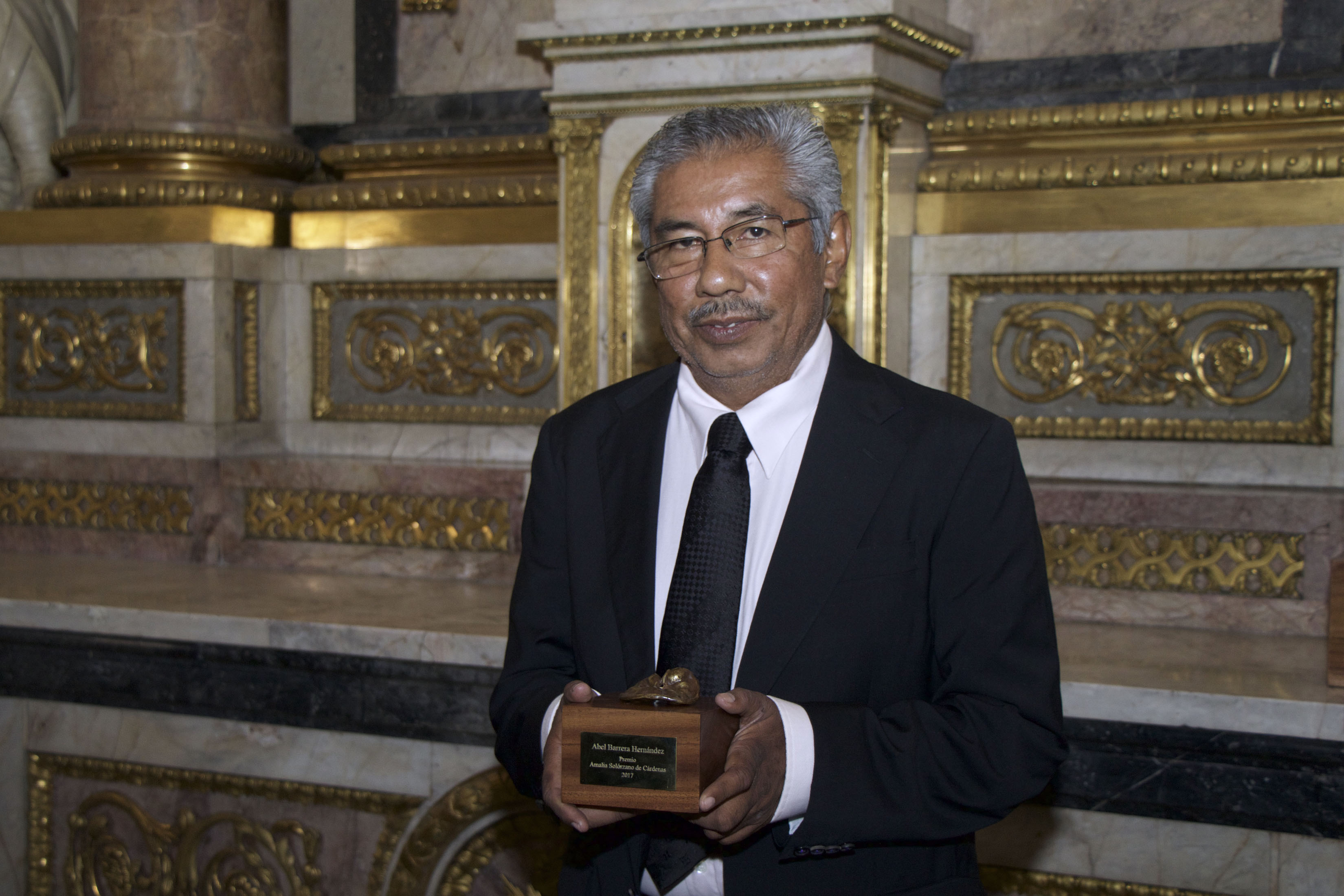
- Born: Tlapa de Comonfort, Guerrero, Mexico
- Occupation: human rights activist
- Organization: Center for Human Rights of the Mountain of Tlachinollan
- Awards: Robert F. Kennedy Human Rights Award (2010)

Abel Barrera Hernández is a Mexican anthropologist and human rights activist. In 1994, he founded the Center for Human Rights of the Mountain of Tlachinollan in Guerrero, for which he was awarded by Amnesty International and given the 2010 Robert F. Kennedy Human Rights Award.

== Life and career ==
Barrera was born in Tlapa de Comonfort, Guerrero. He later spent twelve years studying theology and anthropology.

In 1994, he returned to his home city of Tlapa de Comonfort to found the Center for Human Rights of the Mountain of Tlachinollan. At the time, indigenous and grassroots groups were on the rise in the area, and Tlachinollan worked to improve their access to education, health care, and legal representation.

Beginning in 2004, the center became active in reporting abuses by the Mexican army following the increasing militarization of the country's war on narco-traffickers. The staff reported on rapes, forced disappearances, arbitrary detentions, seizure of lands, and the deliberate targeting of human rights activists; their reporting opened them to threat in turn. In May 2009, the danger to Tlachinollan's staff grew severe enough that the Inter-American Court (IAC) ordered government protection for every member of the organization. In the same year, Tlachinollan brought a case before the IAC of two indigenous women, Inés Fernández Ortega and Valentina Rosendo Cantú, who had been tortured and raped by Mexican military personnel; when the IAC published its findings the following year, it found the military guilty of the abuses.

By 2010, the staff included more than twenty people, handling 1,500 human rights complaints a year. Barrera's lawyer, Vidulfo Rosales, was threatened for his defense of indigenous women in May 2012, causing Tlachinollan to file a complaint on his behalf. In the same month, Tlachinollan members testified before the Tom Lantos Human Rights Commission of the U.S. Congress on military abuses in Guerrero.

== Recognition ==
In 2007, Tlachinollan won the MacArthur Award for Creative and Effective Institutions of the John D. and Catherine T. MacArthur Foundation, which came with a cash prize of US$500,000. Amnesty International's German branch recognized Barrera's work in March 2011 with its Sixth Annual Human Rights Award, given for his struggles "at great personal risk for the rights of the indigenous population in the state of Guerrero". In 2010, Barrera was given the Robert F. Kennedy Human Rights Award for "his courageous defense of the rights of rural and indigenous peoples living in Guerrero State in southern Mexico."
