= Darci Frigo =

Brazilian land reform activist

Darci Frigo is a Brazilian land reform activist. In 2001, he was awarded the Robert F. Kennedy Human Rights Award.
