= Ragia Omran =

Human rights activist and lawyer

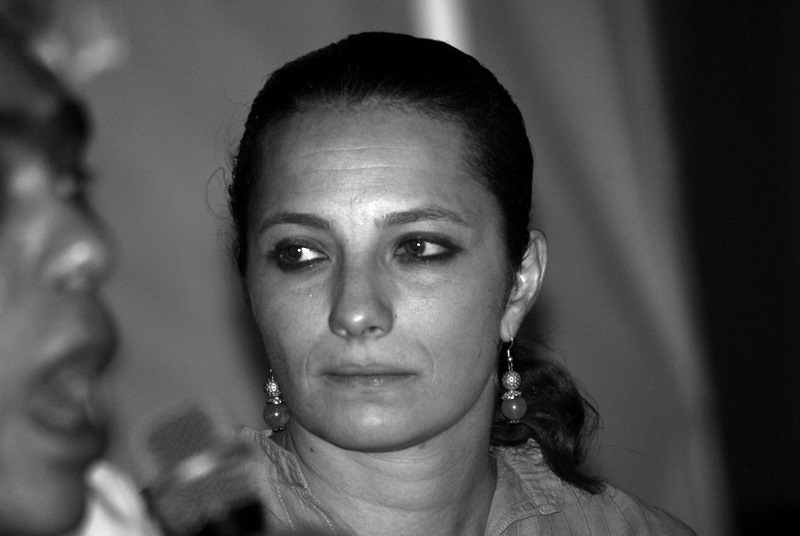
Ragia Omran

Ragia Omran (Arabic: راجية عمران) is a human rights activist, lawyer and feminist. She was awarded the Robert F. Kennedy Human Rights Award. She has campaigned against female genital mutilation and defended political protesters during the Arab Spring protests.

== Background ==
Ragia Omran is an Egyptian lawyer with almost twenty years of experience working on banking and financial transactions. She has served a 4-year term on the Egyptian National Council for Human Rights. She is a founding member of the "Front to Defend Egypt’s Protesters" and of "No to Military Trials for Civilians", two groups that provide pro bono legal aid and support for families of detainees. She was also a long-time volunteer at the Hisham Mubarak Law Center, which provides free legal aid for victims of torture and arbitrary detention. In addition to her work as a corporate and human rights lawyer, Ragia Omran is an active member of several Egyptian civil society organisations. From 2005 to 2008 she served as the chairperson of the New Woman Foundation and she is also a member of Shayfeencom, a non-partisan, non-profit organisation focused on election monitoring and transparency.

== Awards ==
Ragia Omran was chosen from among 15 rights defenders from around the world to receive the Franco-German Prize for Human Rights and the Rule of Law on December 10, 2017.
