= Réseau des Défenseurs des Droits Humains en Afrique Centrale =

The Réseau des Défenseurs des Droits Humains en Afrique Centrale (REDHAC) (In English, "Central Africa Human Rights Defenders Network") is a nongovernmental organization that focuses on the rights and protection of human rights defenders in Central Africa.

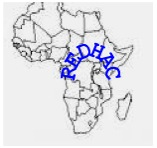
Protection, Promotion, Plaidoyer

== Members ==
Central Africa has 10 countries, of which REDHAC covers eight namely the Democratic Republic of Congo, Cameroon, Chad, Gabon, Central African Republic, the Republic of Congo, Equatorial Guinea and Sao Tome and Principe. Burundi and Rwanda have joined the Network of East and Horn of Africa.

Maximilienne Ngo Mbe has led the Réseau de Défenseurs des Droits Humains de l’Afrique Centrale) (REDHAC) since 2010.

== Aims ==
Overall aim:

- Ensure the recognition of the status and protection of human rights defenders.

Specific aims:

- Helping to strengthen the capacities of human rights defenders for their safety and protection in their work.
- Conducting an effective advocacy on behalf of defenders.
- Investigate and analyze the situation of defenders.
- Find necessary resources for the activities of REDHAC.

== Structure ==
The Network consists of the General Assembly, the Board of Administration, the eight focal points in the different countries, which drive the network and the Permanent Secretariat, whose seat is in Douala, Cameroon.

== Activities ==
Many initiatives have been taken to conduct effective advocacy for the Human Rights Defenders. REDHAC sends press releases every time a Human Rights Defender is in danger in Central Africa. The Network supports the defenders with financial and legal means. The members of REDHAC have on several occasions taken part in meetings and seminars abroad and in Central Africa as well as in TV shows and radio interviews, where they speak and answer questions related to human rights and Human Rights Defenders in Cameroon and Central Africa.
