= 1stdibs =

American e-commerce company

1stdibs.com, Inc.
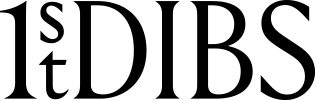
- Type: Public
- Traded as: Nasdaq: DIBS
- Industry: E-commerce; Online marketplace
- Founded: 2000; 26 years ago, in Paris, France
- Founder: Michael Bruno
- Headquarters: 300 Park Avenue South, New York City, U.S.
- Area served: Worldwide
- Key people: David Rosenblatt (CEO)
- Revenue: ▼US$85 million (2023)
- Number of employees: 237 (2023)
- Website: 1stdibs.com

1stdibs.com, Inc. (stylized as 1stDibs) is an American e-commerce company. It has an online marketplace, which sells luxury items such as high-end furniture for interior design, fine art and jewelry. The company has been recognized for "pushing the antiques business into the 21st century." Originally, founded in Paris, it is headquartered in New York City.

== History ==
1stDibs was founded in 2000 by Michael Bruno as an online luxury marketplace for antiques after he visited the Marché aux Puces in Paris, France. 1stDibs.com started as a listings site for art dealers to sell offline, but the site was redesigned in 2013 to give buyers the option to purchase items online. The company has received praise for restricting its listings to authorized dealers for authenticity, and scrutiny for preventing dealers from completing a negotiation offline to avoid the company's commission fees.

In 2015, 1stDibs raised $50 million from venture capital firm Insight Partners. Part of that funding went to buy out all shares held by Bruno, who had stepped away from day-to-day operations. The raise added Deven Parekh from Insight to the company's board.

In March 2019, the company completed a series D funding round of $76 million. It has received $170 million in funding to date and has a valuation of more than $500 million. As of February 2019, 1stDibs works with 4,000 dealers in 28 countries.

In December 2019, 1stDibs closed its brick-and-mortar location at Terminal Stores after the new owner of the building began a large-scale construction project.

In June 2021, the company went public on the Nasdaq, under the symbol DIBS, raising $112 million at a valuation of roughly $773 million. The years that followed were turbulent -- revenue fell 13% in 2023 to $84.7 million -- before a restructuring effort stabilized the business. The company exited 2025 as its first Adjusted EBITDA-positive year as a public company, though a return to GMV growth is not expected until Q4 2026, with a depressed housing market remaining a key headwind.
