= Yolanda Becerra =

Colombian pacifist and feminist

- Born: Yolanda Becerra Vega; 1959 (age 66–67); Barrancabermeja, Colombia
- Awards: Per Anger Prize (2007); Ginetta Sagan Award (2009)

Yolanda Becerra Vega (born 1959) is a Colombian feminist and pacifist activist. She is the founder and currently the national director of the National Directorate of the Popular Women's Organization (Spanish: Organización Femenina Popular; OFP), an entity created in 1972 in the Diocese's Pastoral Ministry, which in 1988 became an autonomous organization based in Barrancabermeja to support women in peaceful resistance against violence and defend peaceful dialogue. She is currently putting her efforts into establishing entities for women such as the construction of a Museum of Memory and Human Rights for Women and she also developed Women's Agendas for Territory and Peace.

During more than four decades in defense of women victims of the conflict in Barrancabermeja and Magdalena Medio, she has suffered persecution and siege by paramilitary groups and has been threatened with death on several occasions. The Office of the Attorney General itself denounced the plan of the United Self-Defense Forces of Colombia to assassinate her. The Popular Women's Organization and other social groups that opposed the violence were declared military targets and obligated to take forceful protection measures.

== Biography ==
Yolanda Becerra is the oldest of seven siblings and belongs to a working-class family from the northeastern part of Barrancabermeja. Her father Gustavo Becerra died when she was 17 years old. Her social conscience began to develop at Camilo Torres School, and she became part of the student movement and the literacy initiatives of Señor de los Milagros parish.

At age 20, when she finished high school, she began working as secretary of the parish of the northeastern sector of her hometown, and two years later she began to work in the Diocese's Social Pastoral Ministry, an environment especially influenced by liberation theology, and began on her path into the OFP. Becerra explained in an interview that she did not understand why women had to organize separately when strong social movements already existed. "It seemed like a waste and I had a big tantrum. Later I understood why it was important to have a women's organization," she said.

The women in Barrancabermeja–Magdalena Medio, we were going around in a pack. We were called and told: they are going to kill a person on that side; we got 100 women there and they had to give it up. We saved many people. It was the way to handle fear and to protect ourselves without being accomplices of death.

— Yolanda Becerra in Humanas Colombia

== Popular Women's Organization ==
In 1988 Yolanda Becerra and Rosalba Meriño committed themselves to the autonomy of the OFP with regard to the Pastoral Ministry.

On 23 December 2000, paramilitaries entered the city and imposed their law on the civilian population. It was then that the OFP adopted a position of resistance in the defense of civil and political rights and sought national and international support. Several of its members have been killed: Esperanza Amaris in October 2003, Diafanol Sierra Vargas in 2002, and Yamile Agudelo was tortured and murdered in March 2006. Yolanda Becerra herself was attacked, threatened, and tortured in her own home in 2007.

In 2005, Yolanda Becerra was nominated for the Nobel Peace Prize along with 1,000 other women from 155 countries.

In 2007 shortly after the Swedish government's announcement that she was being awarded the Per Anger Prize, she suffered an attack in her own home. Years later, Becerra continues to fight to defend dialogue and peace.

== Awards and recognitions ==
- 2005: Nominated for the Nobel Peace Prize in the 1000 PeaceWomen proposal
- 2007: Per Anger Prize instituted by the Swedish government to recognize those who are dedicated to promoting humanitarian and democratic activities
- 2009: Ginetta Sagan Award granted by Amnesty International in recognition of people who fight in defense of the human rights of women and children

== See also ==
- Colombian peace process
- Human rights in Colombia
- List of peace activists
- List of women pacifists and peace activists
