= Jeannine Mukanirwa =

Congolese women's rights activist

- Born: 1965 (age 60–61); Kinshasa, Democratic Republic of the Congo
- Known for: Women's rights activism and peace promotion
- Children: 2

Jeannine Mukanirwa Tshimpambu (born 1965) is a Congolese women's rights activist. She has been recognised by Amnesty International for her work for women's rights and peace promotion.

== Early life ==
Jeannine Mukanirwa was born in 1965 in Kinshasa, Democratic Republic of the Congo. She has two children.

== Activism ==
Mukanirwa began women's rights activist work in 1989. In 2001 she was serving as vice president of Promotion et Appui aux Initiatives Feminines (PAIF), a Congolese women's rights organisation. Since 1994, the organization has worked to provide social, legal, psychological, medical and political support to women who have been raped in Kivu Province of the Democratic Republic of Congo. On 26 January she was arrested by Congolese authorities for suspected involvement in the assassination of President Laurent-Désiré Kabila. She was released the following month and subsequently moved to Canada to avoid political persecution, but continued to work for PAIF. In the early 2000s she condemned rape of women in the eastern Congo. In 2002, Amnesty International accorded her its Ginetta Sagan Award for her work for women's rights and peace promotion.

Mukanirwa oversaw the release of a pamphlet on violence against women in the Congo in 2007. In 2009 she became the coordinator of Medica mondiale's Peacebuilding Project in the Congo. In 2018 she offered herself as a candidate to become President of the Democratic Republic of the Congo in the December elections..

== Works cited ==
- U.S. Department of State (2002), Country Reports on Human Rights Practices: Report Submitted to the Committee on Foreign Affairs, U.S. House of Representatives and Committee on Foreign Relations, U.S. Senate by the Department of State, vol. 1, U.S. Government Printing Office
