= Magodonga Mahlangu =

Human rights activist

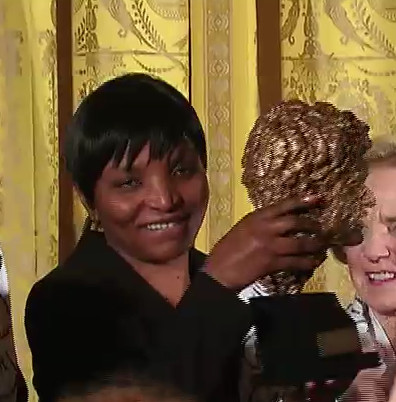
- Magodonga Mahlangu of WOZA receiving Robert F Kennedy Human Rights Award from Obama in 2009
- Born: September 23, 1972 (age 53); Bulawayo, Zimbabwe

Magodonga Mahlangu is a women's rights campaigner from Zimbabwe who in 2009 was awarded the Robert F Kennedy Human Rights Award by U.S. President Barack Obama.

Mahlangu is a leader of Women of Zimbabwe Arise (WOZA), founded with Jenni Williams. When presenting the award to Magodonga and WOZA, Obama commented: "By her example, Magodonga has shown the women of WOZA and the people of Zimbabwe that they can undermine their oppressors' power with their own power -- that they can sap a dictator's strength with their own. Her courage has inspired others to summon theirs." In her remarks accepting the award, Mahlangu quoted Robert F. Kennedy, saying, "The future is not a gift: it is an achievement. Every generation helps make its own future."

As of 2008, Mahlangu had been arrested more than 25 times and by 2011, over 30 times. Human Rights Watch denounced the repeated arrests of Mahlangu and Williams, stating after one arrest that the Zimbabwean government should release the women and "allow civil society the right to demonstrate peacefully".

Mahlangu born in a suburb of Bulawayo and she was raised in the South Matebeleland area and educated at a private school where she received a diploma in coaching and sports administration. She was annoyed that local athletes were being discriminated against. She founded WOZA with Williams and Sheba Dube to protest against economic and political changes in their country. She began organising protests for WOZA in 2003. Mahlangu's family now live outside Zimbabwe. She was unmarried and had no children in 2011.
