= Haitian Bridge Alliance =

US non-profit organization

- Abbreviation: HBA
- Nickname: The Bridge
- Formation: 2016; 10 years ago
- Type: 501(c)(3)
- Headquarters: San Diego
- Executive Director: Guerline Jozef
- Revenue: 3,435,306 USD (2023)
- Expenses: 2,539,210 USD (2023)
- Website: haitianbridgealliance.org

The Haitian Bridge Alliance is a US nonprofit working on behalf of Haitian and other black immigrants to the United States. They have offices in San Diego, California, and Tijuana, Mexico. It was founded by Pethou Archange and Guerline M. Jozef. Ms Jozef is the current director.

In 2022, the Alliance sought to end Title 42, a US policy that, during a health emergency, "allows border officials to expel migrants back to Mexico or their home countries without offering them the opportunity to be screened for asylum eligibility." The policy has since been terminated due to the end of the COVID-19 emergency.

The Alliance has also created a fund to pay the bond of black migrants, such as Haitians, who are in immigration detention. They have also covered the costs of funerals for Haitians that have died at the US-Mexico border.

== Awards ==
In 2021, the Alliance won the Robert F. Kennedy Human Rights award for their work with migrants at the US-Mexico border.

== Legal actions ==
In September 2024, the executive director of the Alliance filed a bench memorandum and affidavit at the Clark County Ohio Municipal Court, alleging that presidential candidate Donald Trump and vice presidential candidate JD Vance had committed multiple crimes by promoting the false Springfield, Ohio, cat-eating hoax, where the candidates claimed that Haitian immigrants in Springfield, Ohio, had been eating neighbors pets. The bench memorandum asserts that this resulted in "disrupting public services (e.g., bomb threats), making false alarms, two counts of complicity, two counts of telecommunications harassment and aggravated menacing", and asked the court to issue arrest warrants for the candidates. On October 4, the case was decided with an order for its matters to be "referred to the Clark County Prosecuting Attorney for further investigation and determination whether any prosecution is warranted."
