= Librada Paz =

- Born: San Juan Mixtepec, Juxtlahuaca, Oaxaca, Mexico
- Education: Rochester Institute of Technology
- Occupation: Activist
- Known for: Advocacy for farmworkers
- Awards: Robert F. Kennedy Human Rights Award (2012)

Librada Paz is a Mexican-American activist for the rights of farmworkers.

Paz grew up in San Juan Mixtepec, Juxtlahuaca, Oaxaca, Mexico. At the age of 15, Paz and an older sister crossed the Arizona desert into the U.S. The pair then went to Ohio to join one of their brothers, who was picking tomatoes. For a few years, Paz also worked as a migrant farmworker, during which time she reports being sexually abused on several occasions. Later she told her brothers she wished to attend school, and they agreed to financially support her so she could quit. She completed a degree in mechanical engineering technology from Rochester Institute of Technology and became a U.S. citizen in 1998.

Paz also became active in lobbying for farmworkers' rights in New York State. She later served on the council of the Rural Migrant Ministry, a nonsectarian group working to improve the lives of migrant workers.

In 2012, she won the Robert F. Kennedy Human Rights Award. One of the judges, Dean Claudio Grossman of the Washington College of Law, stated:

A farmworker herself, Ms. Paz is one of the most credible voices on the dire conditions that affect them. At the same time, she embodies an important message of human dignity and hope. She demonstrates that through organization and commitment, rights are obtainable, improving both the conditions of farmworkers and society at large.
