= Gloria Flórez =

Colombian activist

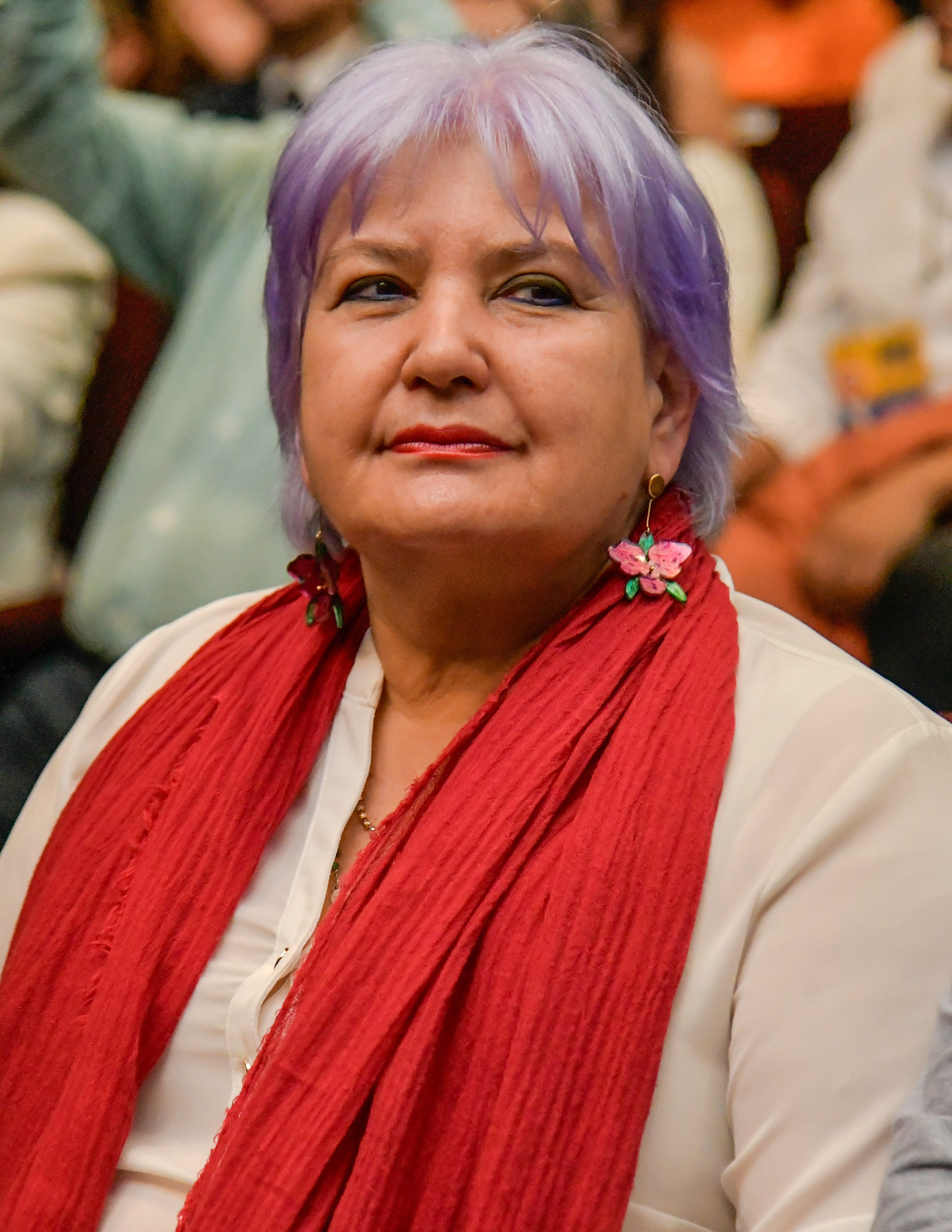
Gloria Flórez in 2024

Gloria Flórez Schneider is a Colombian activist on behalf of internally displaced persons. She is the head of MINGA, an "Association for Alternative Social Policy". In 1998, she won the Robert F. Kennedy Human Rights Award, along with Berenice Celeyta, Jaime Prieto, and Mario Calixto.

In 2004, MINGA advocated on behalf of the people of the Catatumbo region, 30,000 of whom were displaced following heavy fighting. In 2009, Flórez and MINGA lobbied for an investigation into the claims of drug lord Diego Murillo that he had financed the 2002 election campaign of President Álvaro Uribe.

== See also ==
- Catatumbo campaign
