= Hawa Aden Mohamed =

Somali social activist (born 1949)

Hawa Aden Mohamed حواء عدن محمد
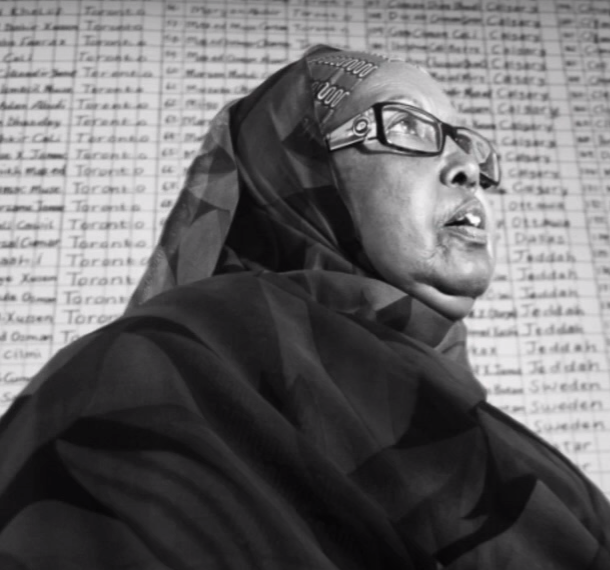
- in 2012
- Born: ca. 1949; Somalia
- Occupation: social activist
- Title: Founder & Executive Director of Galkayo Education Centre for Peace and Development

Hawa Aden Mohamed (Somali: Xawa Aden Maxamed, Arabic: حواء عدن محمد) is a Somali social activist. She is the founder and executive director of the Galkayo Education Centre for Peace and Development.

== Personal life ==
Nicknamed Hooyo Hawa ("Mother Hawa"), Mohamed was born in Somalia. After the start of the civil war, she moved to Canada.

Mohamed returned to her home country in 1995. She subsequently developed an educational programme, working to help women and girls that had been displaced during the conflict. She also advocated against female genital mutilation.

== Career ==
Mohamed is the founder and executive director of the Galkayo Education Centre for Peace and Development (GECPD) in Galkayo. Established in 1999, GECPD conducts awareness raising development initiatives and education training for women and girls in three towns and five villages in the Mudug province of Puntland. Its local areas of operation include Galkayo, Galdogob and Jariban, as well as Beyra, Baacad Weyn, Bali busle, Bur Sallah and Harfo.

The organization provides formal primary education for young girls and second chance education for older girls, serving a total of 781 girls between the ages of 8 and 18. In addition, it offers crocheting, tie and dye, tailoring and other skills training services, as well as capacity building, teacher-training and awareness raising programs on governance, human rights, peace, FGM, democracy and environmental issues. GECPD also offers integrated adult literacy programs for women.

The GECPD is funded through the Somali community, private investors and international organizations. Since its establishment, the organization has evolved into a complete education and resource center for women and youth. Its Galkayo headquarters serves as a hub for women organizations, female teachers, businesswomen and women professionals, and includes a resource center, skills training, nutrition and computer units, 38 classrooms, an 80-person capacity conference hall, tree planting areas, and two hostels and training institutes. Additionally, the GECPD operates three to four classrooms outside of its main office. In 2006 she received the prize "Archivio Disarmo - Golden Doves for Peace" awarded by IRIAD.

== Awards ==
Aden has received a number of awards for her work with the GECPD and general social activism. Among these are the 1994 Woman of the Year Award from the Ontario Women's Directorate, the 2001 Voices of Courage Award by the Women's Commission for Refugee Women and Children, the 2003 Outstanding Girl-Child and Transparency & Efficiency Award from Novib at the Somali Civil Society Symposium, the 2004 Marie Claire Top Ten Women of the World award, the 2005 Al Ummu Madrasaa award, the 2005 11th Annual Ginetta Sagan Award by Amnesty International, and the 2012 Nansen Refugee Award.
