= Guerline Jozef =

Haitian-American human rights activist

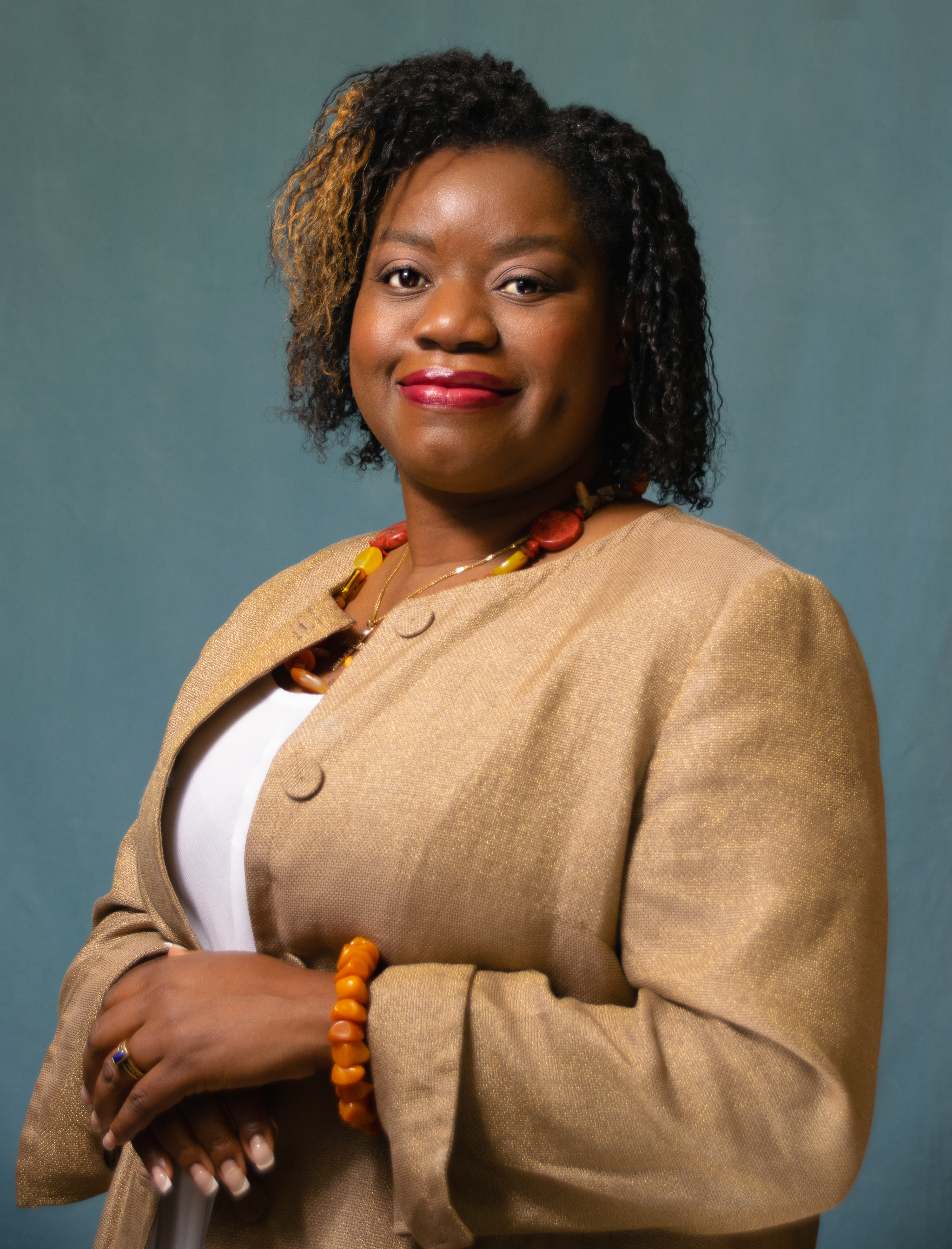
- Organization: Haitian Bridge Alliance

Guerline Jozef is a Haitian-American activist who is co-founder and the executive director of the nonprofit Haitian Bridge Alliance.

== Biography ==
Jozef had initially worked in audio-visual entertainment. After learning about a group of Haitians looking for asylum at the United States border in 2015, she changed her career and decided to work with the migrant population.

Jozef founded the Haitian Bridge Alliance, the only Black-led, woman-led, Haitian-American-led organization serving migrants at the U.S.-Mexico border. Jozef also co-founded the Black Immigrants Bail Fund and the Cameroon Advocacy Network. Jozef's work focuses on migrants of African Descent.

In 2021, Jozef won the Robert F. Kennedy Human Rights Award. She chose to have the ceremony at the border, where she called for an end to Title 42 expulsion.

On behalf of the Haitian Bridge Alliance, Jozef filed criminal charges against Donald Trump due to his promotion of the Springfield pet-eating hoax.

== Awards ==
- 2021: 40 Most Influential People on Race, Politics, and Policy, Politico
- 2021: Border Heroes Award, Las Americas
- 2021: Robert F. Kennedy Human Rights Award
- 2022: Community Champion Award, Haitian-American Elected Officials Network
- 2022: Arthur C. Helton Human Rights Award, American Immigration Lawyers Association
- 2022: Newsmaker of 2022, The Haitian Times
- 2024: 100 Women, BBC)
- Dutty Bookman Award
