= Alessandra Korap =

Brazilian Indigenous leader and activist

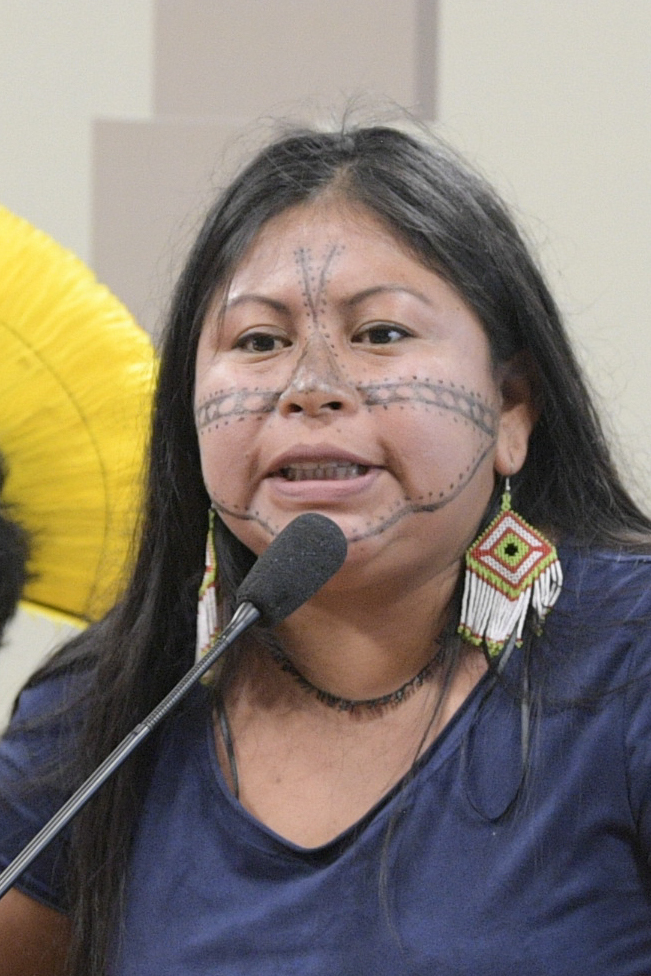
- Korap in 2020
- Born: 1985 (age 40–41); Munduruku, Pará, Brazil
- Education: Federal University of Western Pará
- Occupation: Human rights activist
- Awards: Robert F. Kennedy Human Rights Award; Goldman Environmental Prize

Alessandra Korap (Munduruku Village, Pará, 1985) is an indigenous leader and Brazilian environmental activist from the Munduruku ethnic group. She has working on defending the demarcation of indigenous territory and denouncing the illegal activities of the mining and logging industries. In 2020, she received the Robert F. Kennedy Human Rights Award in the United States. In 2023, Korap was awarded the Goldman Environmental Prize for South and Central America.

== Career ==
From an early age, Korap was interested in politics and attended tribal council meetings, at a time when it was not customary for women to attend. With the progressive invasion of indigenous lands and the loss of her rights, she became more involved in activism. In 2019, she moved to Santarém to study law at the Federal University of Western Pará (UFOPA), to better prepare herself for her activism.

She has stood out as an advocate for the interests of indigenous peoples against the invasion of their lands by miners. Korap was the first woman to lead the Pariri Indigenous Association, which brings together ten villages in the Middle Tapajós region in Pará. One of the main consequences to indigenous lives in the Middle Tapajós caused by the exploitation of this territory, and denounced by Alessandra, is the impact of mercury which is widely used in mining activities. A study carried out by Fiocruz in partnership with WWF-Brasil indicates that all research participants are affected by this contaminant. Six out of ten participants had mercury levels above safe limits: about 57.9% of participants had mercury levels above 6 μg/g – which is the maximum safety limit established by health agencies.

In 2020, Korap gained international recognition by receiving the Robert F. Kennedy Human Rights Award, being the second Brazilian to be awarded. In justifying the award, it was said that "as a leader, Alessandra defends indigenous rights, especially in the struggle for the demarcation of indigenous territories and against large projects that affect indigenous lands and traditional territories in the Tapajós region." On the occasion, John Kerry, special envoy of US President Joe Biden, gave the keynote address, saying:

The Munduruku people in Brazil are warriors in many different ways. They have actively resisted the constant, violent, illegal, and sometimes state-sponsored pressure from loggers and miners to exploit their lands. Alessandra, you spoke and continue to speak the truth to power."

Upon receiving the award, Alessandra declared that "the award is not just for me, it is for the struggle of the Munduruku people and other people who ask for help, who cry out but are not heard." She also works to minimize the impact of the COVID-19 pandemic among indigenous people.

Korap has received death threats and had her house invaded and robbed for her activism. In 2019, a group of federal deputies from Germany asked the Brazilian government to provide her protection. The invasion of her house took place ten days after her trip to Brasília with other indigenous people to denounce the action of illegal mining and logging and demand the demarcation of indigenous lands. Between 2018 and 2019, according to Greenpeace, deforestation on Munduruku lands increased sixfold. German deputies signed a letter addressed to President Jair Bolsonaro and delivered it to the Brazilian embassy in Berlin, requesting that Brazilian authorities instruct those responsible for the investigation to start an in-depth investigation. In the same letter, they also expressed their concern about the situation of human rights defenders in Brazil and called on the government to "make the protection of these legitimate leaders a priority" and to "do everything in their power to facilitate the work of civil society organizations".

== Awards ==
- 2020: Robert F. Kennedy Human Rights Award, United States.
- 2020: Taz Panter Award, Berlin.
- 2023: Goldman Environmental Prize for South and Central America.
