= Ljiljana Raičević =

Montenegrin activist

- Born: 29 June 1947 (age 79)

Ljiljana Raičević (Serbo-Croatian Cyrillic: Љиљана Раичевић; born 29 June 1947, née Petrović) is a human rights and women's rights activist in Montenegro. She was the 2006 laureate of Amnesty International's Ginetta Sagan Fund Award. Raičević created Montenegro's SOS LINE, the first NGO that in that country which served women by providing resources for women in abusive relationships. After noticing that the women calling the SOS LINE needed additional assistance, such a safe place to stay, as well as medical, psychological, and legal assistance, Raičević established the Women's Safe House, the first shelter in Montenegro for victims of domestic violence. With the Safe House, she successfully lobbied the Parliament of Montenegro for the adoption of a witness protection law.

== Biography ==
Raičević was born in Podgorica, Montenegro. Her father was Milovan Petrović and her mother Lyubov, was a Belarusian from Minsk. Raičević attended the high school in Podgorica where her mother taught Russian language; she played volleyball and was a member of the cultural society, "Budo Tomović". After high school, she entered the Faculty of History and Geography in Nikšić. She met her future husband Andriju Loca Raičevića (d. 1994) when he was a young lawyer; he later became deputy minister of the Montenegrin Ministry of Interior Affairs. They have three children, a daughter, and two sons.

She worked at the Medical Institute in Podgorica from 1970 until her retirement in 1999. Between 1985 and 1989, she was president of the Union of Medical Workers. She also served as an elected councillor in the Municipal Parliament for the Liberal Alliance of Montenegro. In 1996, she established the first women's NGO in Montenegro, a hotline for victims of domestic violence, and served as its coordinator until 1999. In that year, she founded the NGO, Women's Safe House, the first shelter for victims of domestic violence in Montenegro. In 2001, she became a member of the Montenegrin project board for the protection of victims of human trafficking. In addition to working with victims of domestic violence and human trafficking, Raičević educates police and state authorities on these issues.

== Awards ==
In 2003, she was named "Person of the Year" by Vreme, the Belgrade-based newspaper. She was the 2006 laureate of the Ginetta Sagan Fund Award.
