= Amílcar Méndez Urízar =

Guatemalan activist and politician

Amílcar Méndez Urízar is a Guatemalan human rights activist and former Congressman (1996–2000). In July 1988 he founded the Council for Ethnic Communities "We Are All Equal" (CERJ). In 1990 he was the recipient of the Robert F. Kennedy Human Rights Award and the Carter-Menil Human Rights Prize.

In October 2003, the Inter-American Commission on Human Rights requested that Guatemala adopt precautionary measures to protect the life and person of Méndez in the wake of death threats made against him and the murder of another CERJ activist. On 17 August 2007, his son José Emanuel was murdered in Guatemala City.
