= Publicolor =

- Formation: 1996; 30 years ago
- Founder: Ruth Lande Shuman
- Type: Nonprofit organization
- Headquarters: New York City

Publicolor is a not-for-profit organization based in New York City. It engages high-risk, low-income students ages 12–24 in a multi-year continuum of design-based programs to encourage academic achievement, college preparation, job readiness, and community service.

Publicolor was founded by award-winning industrial designer Ruth Lande Shuman. It began as a pilot program for her master's degree in industrial design. She was affected by seeing so many public schools that looked more like institutions than facilities to foster creative thinking and learning. She saw schools that were in need of an environmental change. It's a fact that students learn better in beautiful surroundings, even more so when they are the ones creating that environment. Publicolor turns prison-like, hostile school environments into warm, welcoming student-centric environments. At the end of each project, students are left with a newly transformed building, a new sense of community and a much greater sense of safety. According to Shuman, “Teachers and students overwhelmingly report feeling safer in a Publicolored school. With minds no longer frozen by fear, teachers can teach and students can learn,”. Students are involved in the entire process, from choosing the colors to doing the painting. A vote is held for the most popular combinations. There's a school-wide vote so that everyone gets a say. “I saw environments that were so profoundly disrespectful, that looked and felt like prisons and that’s when the light bulb went on,” said Publicolor president and founder, Ruth Lande Shuman. “I thought, if I put a paintbrush in the hands of especially disaffected students, they would change the way their school looked and felt.”

Publicolor runs afterschool mentoring programs three days a week for students, starting in the seventh grade through high school and college. Academic support, career guidance, and life-skills classes are offered through a design-based curriculum that aims to build character, self-esteem, work habits and goal-setting. The long-term tutoring and investment have resulted in a 95 percent high school graduation rate for Publicolor students, which is above the average of 65 percent for public school students from low-income areas. Since its conception, Publicolor has painted more than 450 schools and community facilities. The long-term, intensive curriculums offered, not only encourage community involvement, but also academic achievement, college prep, and job readiness. The 7-week Summer Design Studio at Pratt Institute aims to avoid summer learning loss by sharpening student's math and literacy skills through product design. Lande Shuman said she didn't set out to create a new model, “but what emerged was this applied learning model, which appeals to a lot of kids who are otherwise not attracted to traditional education.”

In 2005, it was among 406 New York City arts and social service institutions to receive part of a $20 million grant from the Carnegie Corporation, which was made possible through a donation by New York City mayor Michael Bloomberg. In 2014 it was named one of 12 recipients of the National Arts+Humanities Youth Program Award by The President's Committee on the Arts and Humanities.

In 2015, Publicolor created a Sol LeWitt installation at the High School of Fashion Industries in Manhattan. The two pieces, "Wall Drawing #1033" and "Wall Drawing #1034" are from a series called Bars of Color Within Squares. In 2018, Publicolor created a Carmen Herrera installation at The New School for Leadership and The Arts in The Bronx. The mural was based on Herrera's 1952 work, "Untitled," which is part of the collection at the Museum of Modern Art.

Eugene Kohn, Founder and Chairman of Kohn Pedersen Fox Associates, is currently the chairman of the board at Publicolor.
