= Robert F. Kennedy Human Rights =

Nonprofit organization

Robert & Ethel Kennedy Human Rights Center
- Founded: 1968; 58 years ago
- Founder: Ethel Kennedy
- Type: Operating public charity (IRS exemption status): 501(c)(3)
- Purpose: Human rights
- Location: Washington, D.C.
- Method: advocacy, awards, education
- Key people: Kerry Kennedy (President); Lynn Delaney (Executive Director); Frank Baker (Chairman)
- Website: kennedyhumanrights.org

Robert & Ethel Kennedy Human Rights Center (formerly the "Robert F. Kennedy Human Rights" and Robert F. Kennedy Center for Justice and Human Rights, or RFK Center) is an American 501(c)(3) nonprofit human rights advocacy organization. It was named after United States Senator Robert F. Kennedy in 1968, a few months after his assassination. The organization of leading attorneys, advocates, entrepreneurs and writers is dedicated to a more just and peaceful world, working alongside local activists to ensure lasting positive change in governments and corporations. It also promotes human rights advocacy through its RFK Human Rights Award, and supports investigative journalists and authors through the RFK Book and Journalism Awards. It is based in New York and Washington, D.C. Robert F. Kennedy's daughter, Kerry Kennedy, serves as the organization's President.

== History ==
The Robert F. Kennedy Memorial was originally established as a non-profit organization in Washington, D.C., in October, 1968. The Kennedy family and friends looked to memorialize Robert Kennedy's public service following his assassination on June 5, 1968, in Los Angeles, California. Fred Dutton, a long-time friend and Kennedy ally, was named executive director, and Peter B. Edelman, a member of Kennedy's senatorial staff, became associate director. The chairman of the executive committee was former U.S. Secretary of Defense Robert S. McNamara.

The Memorial was announced during a press conference at Hickory Hill in McLean, Virginia, on Tuesday, October 29, 1968. Kennedy's brother Ted led the press conference, stating that the organization would be a "living memorial" that would work in areas of poverty, crime, and education in America. He went on to say the Memorial would be "an action-oriented program that we think will carry on his concerns, his actions, his efforts to work on so many of the problems in this country that have no solutions". He was joined at the press conference by his sisters, Patricia Kennedy Lawford and Jean Kennedy Smith, as well as dozens of Kennedy family friends and aides.

Kennedy's widow Ethel Kennedy did not attend the press conference, but was nearby, in a second-floor bedroom of Hickory Hill on doctor's orders, awaiting the birth of her eleventh child. She issued a statement saying it was the hope of her husband's family and friends that the Robert F. Kennedy Memorial would carry forward the ideals he worked for during his lifetime: "He wanted to encourage the young people and to help the disadvantaged and discriminated against both here and abroad, and he wanted to promote peace in the world. These will be the goals of the memorial."

The memorial and other projects started in Kennedy's memory were later collectively renamed Robert F. Kennedy Human Rights.

== Awards ==
=== Human Rights Award ===
The Robert F. Kennedy Human Rights Award was created by Kathleen Kennedy Townsend in 1984 to honor individuals around the world who show courage and have made a significant contribution to human rights in their country.

In addition to receiving a financial award, laureates can partner with the RFK Center on projects to advance their human rights work, benefiting from the resources and technologies at the foundation's disposal. Some have achieved their goals, some are in exile from their home country. The majority continue to live in their home country and work with the support of the center to establish the human rights they are working for.

Since 1984, awards have been given to 43 individuals and organizations from 25 different countries. The 2009 award was presented by President Barack Obama. In 2009, the RFK Human Rights began a partnership with the California International Law Center (CILC) at the University of California, Davis School of Law focusing on the crisis in Darfur.

==== Laureates ====
Year	Laureate	Country or organization
2025	Jeanette Vizguerra	United States
2025	Elizabeth Oyer	United States
2025	Janet Mills	United States
2024	Arely Westley	United States
2023	Parlamento del Pueblo Xinka	Guatemala
2022	Maximilienne Ngo Mbe	Cameroon
2022	Felix Agbor Nkongho (Balla)	Cameroon
2021	Guerline Jozef	United States
2020	Alessandra Korap Munduruku	Brazil
2019	La Unión del Pueblo Entero	United States
2019	Angry Tías & Abuelas of the Río Grande Valley	United States
2019	Detained Migrant Solidarity Committee	United States
2018	Color of Change	United States
2018	International Indigenous Youth Council	United States
2018	March For Our Lives	United States
2018	United We Dream	United States
2017	Alfredo Romero	Venezuela
2016	Just Leadership USA	United States
2016	Andrea C. James	United States
2015	Natalia Taubina	Russia
2014	Adilur Rahman Khan	Bangladesh
2013	Ragia Omran	Egypt
2012	Librada Paz	United States
2011	Frank Mugisha	Uganda
2010	Abel Barrera Hernández	Mexico
2009	Magodonga Mahlangu	Zimbabwe
2009	Women of Zimbabwe Arise	Zimbabwe
2008	Aminatou Haidar	Western Sahara
2007	Mohammed Ahmed Abdallah	Sudan
2006	Sonia Pierre	Dominican Republic
2005	Stephen Bradberry	United States
2004	Delphine Djiraibe	Chad
2003	Coalition of Immokalee Workers	United States
2002	Loune Viaud	Haiti
2001	Darci Frigo	Brazil
2000	Martin Macwan	India
1999	Michael Kpakala Francis	Liberia
1998	Berenice Celeyta	Colombia
1998	Gloria Florez	Colombia
1998	Jaime Prieto	Colombia
1997	Sezgin Tanrikulu	Turkey
1997	Senal Sarihan	Turkey
1996	Anonymous	Sudan
1996	Nguyen Dan Que	Vietnam
1995	Kailash Satyarthi	India
1995	Doan Viet Hoat	Vietnam
1994	Wei Jingsheng	China
1994	Ren Wanding	China
1993	Bambang Widjojanto	Indonesia
1992	Chakufwa Chihana	Malawi
1991	Avigdor Feldman	Israel
1991	Raji Sourani	State of Palestine
1990	Amilcar Mendez Urizar	Guatemala
1989	Fang Lizhi	China
1988	Gibson Kamau Kuria	Kenya
1987	Kim Geun-tae	South Korea
1987	In Jae-keun	South Korea
1986	Zbigniew Bujak	Poland
1986	Adam Michnik	Poland
1985	Allan Boesak	South Africa
1985	Beyers Naude	South Africa
1985	Winnie Madikizela-Mandela	South Africa
1984	CoMadres	El Salvador

=== Ripple of Hope Award ===
Each year, the Robert F. Kennedy Ripple of Hope Award honors exemplary leaders across government, business, advocacy, and entertainment who have demonstrated an unwavering commitment to social change and worked to protect and advance equity, justice, and human rights. The name of the award is inspired by Kennedy's Ripple of Hope speech in 1966.

==== Laureates ====
Year	Laureates
2025	Martin Cabrera, Jr. Earvin “Magic” Johnson Stefano Lucchini Darren Walker Stephen Colbert
2024	Susan Clark Livingston Lin-Manuel Miranda Antonio Neri John W. Rogers Jr. Thomas J. Wilson
2023	The Edwin Barbey Charitable Trust Fran Drescher The January 6th Select Committee: Zoe Lofgren; Stephanie Murphy; Pete Aguilar; Liz Cheney; Adam Kinzinger; Jamie Raskin; Bennie G. Thompson; Elaine Luria; Adam Schiff
2022	Frank Baker Brian Moynihan Bill Russell President Volodymyr Zelensky Michael Polsky Prince Harry and Meghan Markle
2021	Hans Vestberg Deven Parekh Jose E. Feliciano Stacey Abrams Amanda Gorman
2020	Dr. Anthony Fauci Dolores Huerta Colin Kaepernick Dan Schulman Dan Springer
2019	Nancy Pelosi Wendy Abrams Glen Tullman J. K. Rowling†
2018	Barack Obama Bruce D. Broussard Phil Murphy David Zaslav
2017	Harry Belafonte Alex Gorsky Hamdi Ulukaya
2016	Joseph R. Biden Jr. Scott Minerd Howard Schultz
2015	Tim Cook Roger Altman Marianna Vardinoyannis John Lewis
2014	Robert De Niro Tony Bennett Hilary Rodham Clinton Donato Tramuto
2013	Muhammad Yunus John Boyer
2012	Vincent Mai Taylor Swift
2011	Al Gore Dennis Mathisen
2010	George Clooney Marc Spilker
2009	Bono Wyclef Jean
2008	Clive Davis Desmond Tutu Afsaneh Beschloss
Initial Laureates	Bill Clinton Bob Pittman

†=Recipient returned their award.

=== Book Award ===
The Robert F. Kennedy Book Award was founded in 1980, with the proceeds from Arthur Schlesinger, Jr.'s biography, Robert Kennedy and His Times. Each year, the organization presents an award to the book which "most faithfully and forcefully reflects Robert Kennedy's purposes – his concern for the poor and the powerless, his struggle for honest and even-handed justice, his conviction that a decent society must assure all young people a fair chance, and his faith that a free democracy can act to remedy disparities of power and opportunity."

==== Winners ====
Past winners have been:

- 2025 - Everyone Who is Gone is Here: The United States, Central America, and the Making of a Crisis by Jonathan Blitzer
- 2024 - Black Folk: The Roots of the Black Working Class by Blair LM Kelley
- 2023 - The Third Reconstruction: America's Struggle for Racial Justice in the Twenty-First Century by Peniel E. Joseph
- 2022 - The Sum of Us: What Racism Costs Everyone and How We Can Prosper Together by Heather McGhee and America on Fire: The Untold History of Police Violence and Black Rebellion Since the 1960s by Elizabeth Hinton
- 2021 – Unworthy Republic:The Dispossession of Native Americans and the Road to Indian Territory by Claudio Saunt
- 2020 – Dying of Whiteness: How the Politics of Racial Resentment Is Killing America's Heartland by Jonathan Metzl
- 2019 – American Prison: A Reporter's Undercover Journey into the Business of Punishment by Shane Bauer
- 2018 – Not a Crime to Be Poor: The Criminalization of Poverty in America by Peter Edelman / The Blood of Emmett Till by Timothy Tyson
- 2017 – Evicted: Poverty and Profit in the American City by Matthew Desmond
- 2016 – Once in a Great City: A Detroit Story by David Maraniss
- 2015 – The Crusades of Cesar Chavez by Miriam Pawel
- 2014 – The Great Dissent by Thomas Healy and special recognition to March: Book One by John Lewis, Andrew Aydin, and Nate Powell
- 2013 – The Price of Inequality by Joseph Stiglitz
- 2012 – The Justice Cascade by Kathryn Sikkink
- 2011 – The Big Short by Michael Lewis
- 2010 – Ordinary Injustice by Amy Bach
- 2009 – The Dark Side by Jane Mayer
- 2008 – Going Down Jericho Road by Michael Honey
- 2007 – The Great Deluge by Douglas Brinkley
- 2006 – Mirror to America by John Hope Franklin
- 2005 – Perilous Times by Jeffrey Stone and We Are All the Same by Jim Wooten
- 2004 – Ultimate Punishment by Scott Turow
- 2003 – At the Hands of Persons Unknown by Philip Dray and A Problem from Hell by Samantha Power
- 2002 – American Patriots by Gail Buckley
- 2001 – Without Sanctuary by James Allen and Blood of the Liberals by George Packer
- 2000 – Mandela: The Authorised Biography by Anthony Sampson and No Shame in My Game by Katherine Newman
- 1999 – Walking with the Wind by John Lewis and Michael D'Orso
- 1998 – Race, Crime and the Law by Randall Kennedy and The Soldiers' Tale by Samuel Hynes
- 1997 – Worse Than Slavery by David M. Oshinsky
- 1996 – Circumstantial Evidence: Death, Life, and Justice in a Southern Town by Pete Earley and The Politics of Rage: George Wallace, the Origins of the New Conservatism, and the Transformation of American Politics by Dan T. Carter
- 1995 – Speak Now Against the Day by John Egerton
- 1994 – Taming the Storm: The Life and Times of Judge Frank M. Johnson, Jr., and the South's Fight Over Civil Rights by Jack Bass and special recognition to Herbert Block for Herblock: A Cartoonist's Life
- 1993 – Earth in the Balance: Ecology and the Human Spirit by Vice President Al Gore
- 1992 – Praying for Sheetrock by Melissa Fay Greene
- 1991 – The Long Haul by Myles Horton and Herbert and Judith Kohl and The Burning Season: The Murder of Chico Mendes and the Fight for the Amazon Rain Forest by Andrew Revkin
- 1990 – Among Schoolchildren by Tracy Kidder and Big Sugar by Alec Wilkinson
- 1989 – A Bright Shining Lie by Neil Sheehan and Rachel and Her Children by Jonathan Kozol
- 1988 – Beloved by Toni Morrison and Song in a Weary Throat by Pauli Murray
- 1987 – Bearing the Cross: Martin Luther King, Jr., and the Southern Christian Leadership Conference, by David J. Garrow
- 1986 – Common Ground: A Turbulent Decade in the Lives of Three American Families by J. Anthony Lukas and Reaping the Whirlwind: The Civil Rights Movement in Tuskegee by Robert Norrell
- 1984 – Children of War by Roger Rosenblatt
- 1983 – Let the Trumpet Sound: The Life of Martin Luther King, Jr. by Stephen B. Oates
- 1982 – The Child Savers by Peter S. Prescott
- 1981 – Civilities and Civil Rights: Greensboro, North Carolina, and the Black Struggle for Freedom by William Chafe

=== Journalism Award ===
The Robert F. Kennedy Journalism Award was established in 1968 by a group of reporters covering Kennedy's presidential campaign and "honors those who report on issues that reflect Kennedy's concerns including human rights, social justice and the power of individual action in the United States and around the world." Entries include insights into the causes, conditions and remedies of injustice and critical analysis of relevant public policies, programs, attitudes and private endeavors.

Led by a committee of six independent journalists, the Awards are judged by more than fifty journalists each year. Previous winners include World News anchor Diane Sawyer.

== Other initiatives ==
Robert F. Kennedy Human Rights also promotes a video contest, titled Speak Truth to Power. It is co-sponsored by the American Federation of Teachers and the Tribeca Festival.

== See also ==
- List of human rights organisations
