= Wendy Abrams =

American environmentalist (born 1965)

- Born: 1965 (age 60–61)
- Occupation: Environmentalist
- Spouse: Jim Abrams

Wendy Abrams (born 1965) is an American environmentalist. She is the founder of the non-profit organizations Cool Globes and the Eleven Eleven Foundation. In 2010 she was designated a Women's History Month Honoree by the National Women's History Project.

== Early life and education ==
Abrams grew up Wendy Mills in Highland Park. She received a bachelor's degree in organizational behavior and management from Brown University (1987) and an MBA from the Kellogg Graduate School of Management.

== Career ==
In 2006, Abrams founded Cool Globes, Inc., a non-profit organization dedicated to raising awareness of climate change through public art and education. The first exhibit, "Cool Globes: Hot Ideas for a Cooler Planet" premiered in Chicago in 2007 and since then the exhibition has been in 24 cities and translated into nine languages- from Arabic to Spanish.

Abrams is on the board of Climate Reality Project and the board of trustees for Northwestern University. Abrams is a 2019 Ripple of Hope laureate.

In 2011, she helped establish The Abrams Environmental Law Clinic at the University of Chicago Law School. It was the first step of the Edwin F. Mandel Legal Aid Clinic expansion which intends to guarantee clinical experience to all law students.

=== Philanthropy ===
Abrams is co-founder and CEO of the private foundation, Eleven Eleven Foundation. Priorities for the organization include sustainability, education, medical research and building community.

In 2020, Abrams helped support the creation of the California Climate Action Corps, who led a campaign to plant 90,000 trees in honor of Dr. Jane Goodall’s 90th birthday.

In 2024, Eleven Eleven Foundation launched The Abrams Research Center on Neurogenomics at Northwestern University Feinberg School of Medicine, with a mission to drive scientific innovations and develop effective interventions for Alzheimer's disease.

Abrams created Invisible Words, which was recently on display at Saatchi Gallery in London as part of the Reframed exhibit.

Eleven Eleven announced the creation of the Abrams Climate Academy an innovative fellowship at Kellogg designed to address the urgent challenges of the climate crisis.

=== Politics ===
Abrams expressed a hope that President Obama would initiate divestment from oil. Abrams was a substantive critic of the Keystone Pipeline and urged voters to oppose it, claiming that it would impact American energy independence. Abrams is a major donor to Hillary Clinton, Barack Obama and Rahm Emanuel.

== Personal life ==
She is married to Jim Abrams; they have four children. They live in Highland Park, Illinois.
