= Ginetta Sagan =

Italian human rights activist

- Born: Ginetta Moroni; June 25, 1925; Milan, Italy
- Died: August 25, 2000 (aged 75); Atherton, California, United States
- Organizations: Italian resistance movement, Amnesty International, Aurora Foundation
- Spouse: Leonard Sagan (m. 1951–97)
- Children: 3
- Awards: Presidential Medal of Freedom, Grand Ufficiale Ordine al Merito della Repubblica Italiana

Ginetta Sagan (June 1, 1925 – August 25, 2000) was an Italian-born American human rights activist best known for her work with Amnesty International on behalf of prisoners of conscience.

Born in Milan, Italy, Sagan lost her parents in her teenage years to the Black Brigades of Benito Mussolini. Like her parents, she was active in the Italian resistance movement, gathering intelligence and supplying Jews in hiding. She was captured and tortured in 1945, but escaped on the eve of her execution with the help of Nazi defectors.

After studying in Paris, she attended graduate school in child development in the US and married Leonard Sagan, a physician. The couple then resettled in Atherton, California, where Sagan founded the first chapter of Amnesty International in the western US. She later toured the region, helping to establish more than 75 chapters, and organized events to raise money for political prisoners.

In 1984, Sagan was elected the honorary chair of Amnesty International USA. US President Bill Clinton awarded her the Presidential Medal of Freedom in 1996, and Italy later awarded her the rank of Grand Ufficiale Ordine al Merito della Repubblica Italiana (Grand Official Order of Merit of the Italian Republic). Amnesty International founded an annual Ginetta Sagan Award for activists in her honor.

== Childhood and World War II ==
Ginetta Sagan was born in Milan, Italy, to a Catholic father and Jewish mother. Both of her parents were doctors. Facing rising antisemitism in Europe, her parents arranged false papers identifying her as Christian to hide her Jewish roots.

When World War II began, both of her parents became active in the Italian resistance movement opposing fascist rule, only to be arrested in 1943 by Mussolini's Black Brigades. Her father was later shot in a staged "attempted escape", and her mother sent to Auschwitz, where she was murdered.

Ginetta, then seventeen years old, was already active in the resistance movement, delivering food coupons and clothing to Jews who were in hiding. Following her parents' disappearance, she became a courier for resistance forces in Northern Italy, as well as helping to print and distribute antigovernment pamphlets. On one occasion, she dressed as a cleaning lady to steal letterhead from government offices so that it could be used to forge letters of safe passage to Switzerland. Due to her energy and small size (she never grew to more than five feet tall), she received the nickname Topolino ("Little Mouse").

In late February 1945, Sagan was betrayed by an informer in the movement and, like her parents, arrested by the Black Brigades. During her 45 days of imprisonment, she was beaten, raped, and tortured, leading up to a scheduled April 23 execution. At one point, a jailer tossed her a loaf of bread that contained a matchbox with the word coraggio ("courage") written inside, a moment which would motivate much of her later work on behalf of prisoners. On the day of her scheduled execution, she was being beaten by guards in a villa in Sondrio, Italy, when a pair of German officers forced her Italian captors to release her into their custody. She later recalled watching the stars from the window of their car and thinking, "I will never see another dawn." However, the Germans revealed themselves to be Nazi defectors collaborating with her resistance comrades, and they delivered Sagan safely to a Catholic hospital. Sagan annually celebrated the date of April 23 for the rest of her life.

== Post-war life ==
After Sagan recuperated, she lived in Paris for a time with her godfather, attending the Sorbonne. In 1951, she emigrated to the US to study at the University of Illinois at Chicago, majoring in child development. While there, she met Leonard Sagan, then a young medical student. The couple were married the following year, and would remain together until Leonard's death in 1997. Following their marriage, the pair moved to Washington, D.C. for Leonard's work. Sagan also worked part-time teaching cooking classes to the wives of US Congressmen.

The couple later lived in Boston and Japan before settling in Atherton, California, in 1968. Sagan lived there until her death from cancer on August 25, 2000. Ginetta is survived by her three sons- Duncan, Loring, and Stuart.

== Involvement with Amnesty International ==
Though Amnesty International (AI) had a growing reputation in the UK, at this time, the organization was still in largely unknown in the US. Only eighteen chapters of AI USA had been formed by 1968, all of them in the eastern US, totaling less than a thousand members. Sagan had been involved in the organization in Washington, D.C., and when she arrived in Atherton, she founded the US's 19th chapter, holding its meetings in her living room. The chapter later grew into AI USA's first west coast regional office.

In 1971, Sagan organized a concert with singer Joan Baez, one of her Atherton neighbors, in order to raise money for Greek political prisoners; the concert drew more than 10,000 people. In her memoirs, Baez described Sagan during the period as having "the gifts of an active mind, a love of life and beauty, an unquashable spirit, and a faith in people very much like that of Anne Frank." In the three years that followed, Sagan traveled throughout the American West, founding 75 more AI chapters. By 1978, AI USA's membership had increased to 70,000, more than 100 times that of a decade before. An AI spokesman later attributed Sagan with doing more than anyone to establish Amnesty International in the US, adding that "I think she has probably organized more people than anyone else in the human rights movement globally". She also founded the organization's first newsletter, Matchbox, in 1973.

Sagan became a figure of controversy from the right and later from the left in the 1970s when she and Baez shifted their focus from protesting abuses by American forces in the Vietnam War to protesting the abuses of North Vietnamese reeducation camps following the war. A colleague remembers fellow anti-war activists being "furious" that Sagan would criticize the new Vietnamese communist regime as strongly as she had criticized the US Armed Forces, and Sagan later recalled accusations that she was a fascist or undercover CIA operative. Over the next decade, she also advocated on behalf of prisoners in Chile, the USSR, Poland, and Greece. She served on the AI USA National Board of Directors from 1983 to 1987. In 1994, she was elected the organization's Honorary Chair of the Board.

In addition to her work with Amnesty International, Sagan founded the Aurora Foundation, which investigates and publicizes incidents of human rights abuses.

== Awards ==
In 1987, Sagan won a Jefferson Award for Public Service in the category of "Greatest Public Service Benefiting the Disadvantaged".

In 1996, US President Bill Clinton awarded Sagan the Presidential Medal of Freedom, the highest civilian honor of the US. In the citation, he stated that "Ginetta Sagan's name is synonymous with the fight for human rights around the world. She represents to all the triumph of the human spirit over tyranny." The same year, she was awarded the Grand Ufficiale Ordine al Merito della Repubblica Italiana, Italy's highest honor.

== Ginetta Sagan Fund ==
Amnesty International created the Ginetta Sagan Fund in 1994 in Sagan's honor. The fund grants a $20,000 annual award to a woman or women "who are working to protect the liberty and lives of women and children in areas where human rights violations are widespread".

Previous winners of the award include the following:

- 2025: Jazmín Romero Epiayú, Colombia; Pashtana Durrani, Afghanistan/USA
- 2024: Teresa Njoroge, Kenya; Daniela Ancira Ruiz, Mexico
- 2023: Juwairiya Mohideen, Sri Lanka; Justyna Wydrzyńska, Poland
- 2022: Suha Tutunji, Lebanon; Bai Bibyaon Ligkayan Bigkay, Philippines
- 2021: Norma Andrade, Mexico; Riya Williams Yuyada, South Sudan
- 2019: Victoria Nyanjura, Uganda; Malika Abubakarova, Russia
- 2018: Dorothy Njemanze, Nigeria
- 2017: Charon Asetoyer, Comanche Nation
- 2016: Julienne Lusenge, Democratic Republic of Congo
- 2015: Amal Khalifa Habbani, Sudan
- 2014: Magda Alli and Suzan Fayad, Egypt
- 2012: Jenni Williams, Zimbabwe
- 2010: Rebecca Masika Katsuva, Democratic Republic of Congo
- 2009: Yolanda Becerra Vega, Colombia
- 2008: Betty Makoni, Zimbabwe
- 2007: Lydia Cacho Ribeiro, Mexico
- 2006: Ljiljana Raičević, Serbia and Montenegro
- 2005: Hawa Aden Mohamed, Somalia
- 2004: Nebahat Akkoç, Turkey
- 2003: Sonia Pierre, Dominican Republic
- 2002: Jeannine Mukanirwa, Democratic Republic of Congo
- 2000: Helen Akongo, Uganda; Giulia Tamayo Leon, Peru; Hina Jilani, Pakistan
- 1999: Sima Wali, Afghanistan
- 1999: Adriana Portillo-Bartow, El Salvador
- 1998: Beatrice Mukansinga, Rwanda
- 1997: Mangala Sharma, Bhutan
