= Compassionate leadership =

Compassionate leadership is a term used to describe a leadership style used by employers to show compassion to their followers or subordinates. It is also a relationship-oriented leadership approach in which a leader acknowledges and shows concern to the suffering and difficulties of others (especially subordinates). And showing concern involves recognizing the suffering, showing empathy, and taking action to alleviate or reduce the suffering. In Ramachandran's review of literature on compassionate leadership, they identified six dimensions of compassionate leadership. They include; empathy, openness and communication, concern for physical, mental health and wellbeing, inclusiveness, integrity, and respect and dignity in communicating compassion.

As a branch, compassionate leadership falls within the broader literature of compassion at work. And as defined above, compassionate leadership concerns a leader's practices during suffering whereas workplace compassion extends beyond leaders to everyone. Thus, workplace compassion includes all interpersonal process, involving leaders, management, colleagues and their attention to workplace suffering, showing empathy and taking action. According to Dutton and colleagues, compassion is relational, personal, and also organizational rather than an individual characteristic. Research on compassionate leadership has largely been concentrated in the healthcare sector even though other scholarship has explored sectors like education, business, and other organizational settings.

Compassionate Leadership and Communication

In the field of communication scholarship, especially organizational communication, compassion is a communicative practice. As opposed to it being a leadership quality or a personal feeling or quality, compassion is achieved through interaction. For instance, Miller studied service workers and identified three processes of compassionate communication. First is to notice the sufferings or needs of a person. After noticing, one has to connect with the person by showing empathy, and finally, responding to the suffering through both verbal and non-verbally practices. Most acts of responding involve providing social support including, emotional, instrumental, and informational.

Other communication scholars such as Way & Tracy (2010) conceptualized compassion as recognizing, relating and (re)acting and their study of hospice workers also emphasized the central role of communication throughout these stages/process. They also explained recognizing as all the verbal and nonverbal and contextual cues that indicate or point to suffering. Relating on the other hand means connecting with the 'sufferer' to share emotions, experiences and values. In other words, identifying with and validating the needs of the person in need. (Re)acting means providing care and responding to the expressed suffering. These processes are however, not linear, they may overlap and do not occur in a fixed sequence. It is possible to take action before recognizing someone's action. Likewise, you can recognize suffering, relate with the person and not take an action. Also, one may recognize, not be able to relate with the person in their suffering, but take the best action to reduce the suffering.

Compassion Communication and Power

There seems to be a need for more studies on the critical aspects of compassionate leadership communication. Compassionate (Leadership) communication is not without the influence of power. In unequal power relationships such as leader-employee relationship, power can enable and constrain compassionate communication. Leaders possess the power over most organizational resources including distributing workload, evaluating workers, granting time off work among others. Leaders also affect the psychological safety especially surrounding expression of emotions and discussing personal lives at work. Employees maybe hesitant to disclose their suffering as that may affect their future opportunities and possibly their reputation. For example in a study by Tietsort, Tracy, and Adame, participants in this study disclosed withholding information or hesitating to share details of their suffering as well as refusing or resisting help to maintain their 'professional' image or not burdening the organization.

At the organizational level, research shows that organizational structures and arrangements play a role in compassionate communication. The study by Leach and colleagues revealed that organizations control workload, access to support, and regulate emotional expression and employees, in their collective compassionate responses, reacted to their colleagues' suffering by sharing workload or donating time off. The authors however, argue that, these actions have the tendency to buffer suffering but at the same time reinforce the organizational structures that create the suffering. Their findings presented a paradox where organizations contribute to suffering but the responsibility to show compassion fall on employees. Other studies reveal how compassionate communication can be a tool for control and discipline. This shows how acts of compassion can simultaneously extend care while limiting others' agency to define their own needs.

Compassion and Employee Flourishing

Compassionate (leadership) communication research has often been associated with employees' psychological well-being and strong interpersonal relationships in the workplace (with leaders) and greater work engagement. Studies show that employees who experience compassion from leaders feel legitimized, valued, and more satisfied with their jobs because they feel their personal circumstances have been acknowledged rather than solely being acknowledged for their work output. Moreover, when leaders and other organizational members (re)act to suffering, they mostly do so through the provision of instrumental support which Tracy (2010) defines as providing/receiving practical or tangible assistance. These actions may include recovery time, reducing workload among others which may help employees attend to their personal needs they may have ignored due to work demands. The impact of compassionate communication may also extend beyond the individual to the general work conditions that enable employee flourishing. Workplace conditions like positive friendships, social support, care, mostly have a positive relationship with flourishing. However, Ramachandran cautions that compassionate leadership literature establishes positive associations with some aspects of well-being and not across broader organizational setting.

== See also ==
- Charismatic leadership
- Narcissistic leadership
- Servant leadership
