= Michael Bruno (entrepreneur) =

American entrepreneur

Michael Bruno is an American entrepreneur and the founder of 1stdibs. He is also the founder of the home design app Housepad, Tuxedo Hudson Company and Tuxedo Hudson Realty, and Art-Design-Carta.

== Early life and education ==
Michael Bruno was the fourth of six children. He was born and raised in Larchmont, New York. He is a former competitive swimmer and Junior Olympics winner.

Bruno studied business at San Diego State University and later moved to San Francisco, California, where he worked as a real estate broker.

== Career ==
During the dot-com boom of the 1990s, Bruno worked as a real estate agent for Sotheby's real-estate division in San Francisco. Bruno says he was inspired to get his real estate license at age 19 after reading Napoleon Hill's 1937 self-improvement book Think and Grow Rich.

In 2001, after moving to Paris, France, Bruno created 1stdibs.com, an online luxury marketplace for antiques, jewellery, and fine art. He said the idea for the company came to him while visiting the Clignancourt flea market in Paris.

In 2011, Bruno accepted a $60 million investment from venture capital firm, Benchmark, and stepped down from his role as CEO of 1stdibs but stayed on as chief creative officer.

In 2012, Bruno bought a 12,000-square-foot mansion in Tuxedo Park, New York. The mansion was designed in the early 1900s by John Russell Pope. Bruno also owns a historic park adjacent to the Tuxedo Park property. The 55-acre park was designed by Frederick Law Olmsted, the landscape architect who designed Central Park in New York City. The Tuxedo Park home was featured in a July 2015 photo tour in design magazine Elle Décor.

In 2015, Bruno launched an interior design app called HousePad, a digital household management tool that allows homeowners to communicate with family, guests, interior designers, and staff.

In 2016, Bruno launched Design Carta, a private marketplace for art and design professionals. He also founded Tuxedo Hudson Realty, a commercial and residential real estate company, and Blue Barn, an organic farmstand, that same year.

== Awards ==
In May 2012, New York-based charity organization Lighthouse International honored Bruno and fashion designer Carolina Herrera for being "fashion visionaries." Bruno was also a recipient of the 2012 "Innovators" award from the Sir John Sloane Museum Foundation.

In October 2014, Bruno was the recipient of design and decorating magazine Traditional Home's first Trailblazer Award.

== Personal life ==
Bruno is a collector of historic properties and has been purchasing and restoring historic homes and properties since the 1990s. He says his passion for historic preservation began with the purchase of a 1920s-era villa designed by William Templeton Johnson. Bruno owns several additional historic properties in and around Tuxedo Park, including Loomis Laboratory, a stone castle built in 1901. The Loomis Laboratory building serves as headquarters for Bruno's Housepad app. Bruno and his partner Alexander Jakowec purchased a 14,000 square-foot mansion on Coopers Neck Lane in Southampton, New York in 2015. The mansion was built in the early 20th century by American architect and urban planner Grosvenor Atterbury.

Bruno lives with his partner Alexander Jakowec, a former antiques dealer.
