= Lobaina =

Lobaina is a surname. Notable people with the surname include:

- Néstor Rodríguez Lobaina (fl. 1999–2005), Cuban activist
- Rolando Rodríguez Lobaina (born 1969), Cuban activist
