= Hillel Neuer =

International lawyer, writer, and executive director of UN Watch

- Born: Montreal, Quebec, Canada
- Education: Concordia University (BA); McGill University (BCL, LLB); Hebrew University of Jerusalem (LLM)
- Occupation: Executive director of UN Watch

Hillel C. Neuer (born 1969/1970) is a Canadian-born international lawyer, writer, commentator, and the executive director of UN Watch, a human rights NGO and UN watchdog group based in Geneva, Switzerland.

Neuer is the founding chairman of the Geneva Summit for Human Rights and Democracy, a coalition of 25 NGOs from around the world. He has written on law, politics and international affairs for the International Herald Tribune, Juriste International, Commentary, The New Republic, Christian Science Monitor, and the Jerusalem Center For Public Affairs.

Neuer was selected as one of the "top 100 most influential Jewish people in the world" by Israeli newspaper Maariv, and by the Algemeiner Journal in 2017. He is an outspoken defender of Israel and critic of the UN's human rights councils' actions.

== Early life and education ==
Neuer is from Montreal, Canada. He received a B.A. in intellectual history and political science from Concordia University, and earned a Bachelor of Civil Law and a Bachelor of Laws from the McGill University Faculty of Law in 1997, then obtained a Master of Laws in comparative constitutional law from the Hebrew University of Jerusalem.

Neuer worked at the pro-Israel think tank Canadian Institute for Jewish Research while he was an undergraduate at Concordia. He practiced commercial and civil rights litigation at the international law firm of Paul, Weiss, Rifkind, Wharton & Garrison LLP. Neuer is a member of the New York bar and co-author of the Annotated Copyright Act of Canada and Directors and Officers - A Canadian Legal Manual.

== Career ==
=== Legal career ===
Neuer served as a law clerk to the Supreme Court of Israel and a Graduate Fellow at the Shalem Center think tank.

=== Advocacy for Darfur victims at United Nations ===
Neuer advocated at the United Nations (UN) for human rights victims in Darfur. Neuer chaired the NGO Activist Summit For Darfur in 2007. He challenged Sudan in 2007 for its rejection of human rights experts in Darfur and demanded justice for child victims in Darfur in 2005. In August 2007, Neuer was the keynote speaker at the Save Darfur Canada rally in Montreal.

=== United Nations human rights testimony ===
Neuer has represented human rights victims in testimony before the UN Human Rights Council, a body which he criticized. Neuer is noted for his "scathing commentary" on UNHCR's track record on human rights. His outspoken advocacy for student Yevgeniya "Jenya" Taranenko preceded her release from a Russian prison. Neuer debated Zimbabwe's UN ambassador on CNN over the Mugabe regime's human rights record. In 2007 he spoke out for the Arab, Kurdish, and Baháʼí victims of violations in Iran. In 2004 he spoke out on victims of torture and censorship in Côte d'Ivoire, Zimbabwe, Cuba, Nepal, Myanmar, and Pakistan. Neuer also spoke out for the Lebanese victims of Syrian political assassinations and against the rape and enslavement of women in Syria and Iraq; state-sanctioned limits on the movements, education and employment of women in Iran; and the repression of speech in Saudi Arabia. In March 2025, Neuer criticized Saudi Arabia's chairing of the 69th session of the UN Commission on the Status of Women.

Neuer is known in particular for criticizing the attitude of the UNHCR towards Israel, in his view, the UNHCR seeks "to demonize Israeli democracy, to delegitimize the Jewish state, to scapegoat the Jewish people. They also seek something else: To distort and pervert the very language and idea of human rights."

=== Erroneous arrest during 2007 U.S. visit ===
On November 1, 2007, Neuer presented a report on the United Nations and antisemitism at the invitation of Yale University. The day after giving his presentation, Neuer visited a local restaurant in Needham, Massachusetts, where an employee called the police and falsely reported that Neuer was carrying a gun, leading the police to take him into custody. On the next business day, the Norfolk County court fully cleared Neuer and ruled that the police had acted without probable cause. Initial media reports of a "stand-off" were found to be false and police confirmed that Neuer himself had called 911 twice seeking to exit from the police action that he believed was in pursuit of criminals near the restaurant. "Mr. Neuer was an innocent victim who went to a restaurant in Needham and was traumatized and almost killed," said Neuer's attorney David G. Eisenstadt. On March 31, 2008, the Town of Needham, on behalf of the police, sent Mr. Neuer a full apology, saying he was "an innocent victim caught up in the events of that day."

=== 2009 Toronto Film Festival ===
In 2009 Hillel Neuer became involved in the controversy over Israel's marketing campaign at the 2009 Toronto International Film Festival. Neuer spoke out against the involvement of activist Naomi Klein in protests. Neuer wrote: "Supporters of liberal democratic values may have a hard time understanding why anti-globalization activist Naomi Klein has recruited Jane Fonda and other stars to boycott the Toronto International Film Festival for the crime of showing films from Tel Aviv." Neuer's UN Watch published a report on its website entitled "Naomi Klein Exposed: The Unauthorized Biography". National Post published a response from Judy Rebick. Rebick wrote: "Naomi Klein didn't start the protest, but she used her contacts and her celebrity to make it more effective. The focus is on her because she is today one of the most prominent Jewish intellectuals in the world, and she is starting to be vocal in her criticism of Israeli human rights violations. She is risking a lot to speak out so passionately on this subject."

== Coverage and reception ==
Neuer has appeared before the UN Human Rights Council for a range of causes including the rape victims of Darfur, political prisoners in Cuba, and Middle East peace. He testified as an expert witness before hearings of the U.S. Congress on UN reform in 2007 and 2011, and is regularly quoted by major media outlets including the New York Times, Al Jazeera, Die Welt, Le Figaro, Reuters, Al Ahram and Fox News. Neuer has debated UN human rights issues on CNN, BBC and Al Jazeera, and some of his talks at the UN panel went viral. While working at Paul, Weiss, Rifkind, Wharton & Garrison, Neuer was cited by the U.S. Federal Court for the high quality of his pro bono advocacy.

In a 2014 article in The Jerusalem Post, Yisrael Medad described Neuer as a man who "struggles valiantly and successfully to expose the truth about human rights as practiced in the United Nations and other so-called civil rights NGOs." He is a regular on the speaking circuit.

In 2016, the City of Chicago and Mayor Rahm Emanuel adopted a resolution declaring "Hillel Neuer Day" recognizing "one of the world’s foremost human rights advocates," and for his contributions to "promote peace, justice and human rights around the world."

In 2017, the Algemeiner Journal selected him as one of "the top 100 people positively influencing Jewish life".

In June 2018, Neuer was the recipient of McGill University's highest honorary doctorate degree, Doctorate of Laws, for his work at the Geneva Summit for Human Rights and Democracy. He dedicated the award to dissidents and political prisoners, among them was Chinese activist Yang Jianli who praised Neuer as "one of the world’s most committed, energetic human rights leaders."

In June 2025, Neuer was awarded Canada's King Charles III Coronation Medal.

== Social media ==
In 2025, The Jerusalem Post included Neuer on their list of "50 Most Influential Jews", ranked 45th in a group entry of "seven pro-Israel influencers" that also included Gal Gadot (Israeli actress and model), Arsen Ostrovsky (Israeli lawyer), Siggy Flicker (Real Housewives of New Jersey), Hen Mazzig (social media influencer), Noa Tishby (Israeli actress and model), and Eyal Yakoby (social media strategist).

== See also ==
- Israel and the United Nations
- New antisemitism
- Zionism and Anti-Zionism
