= 2010 Nobel Peace Prize =

- Liu Xiaobo
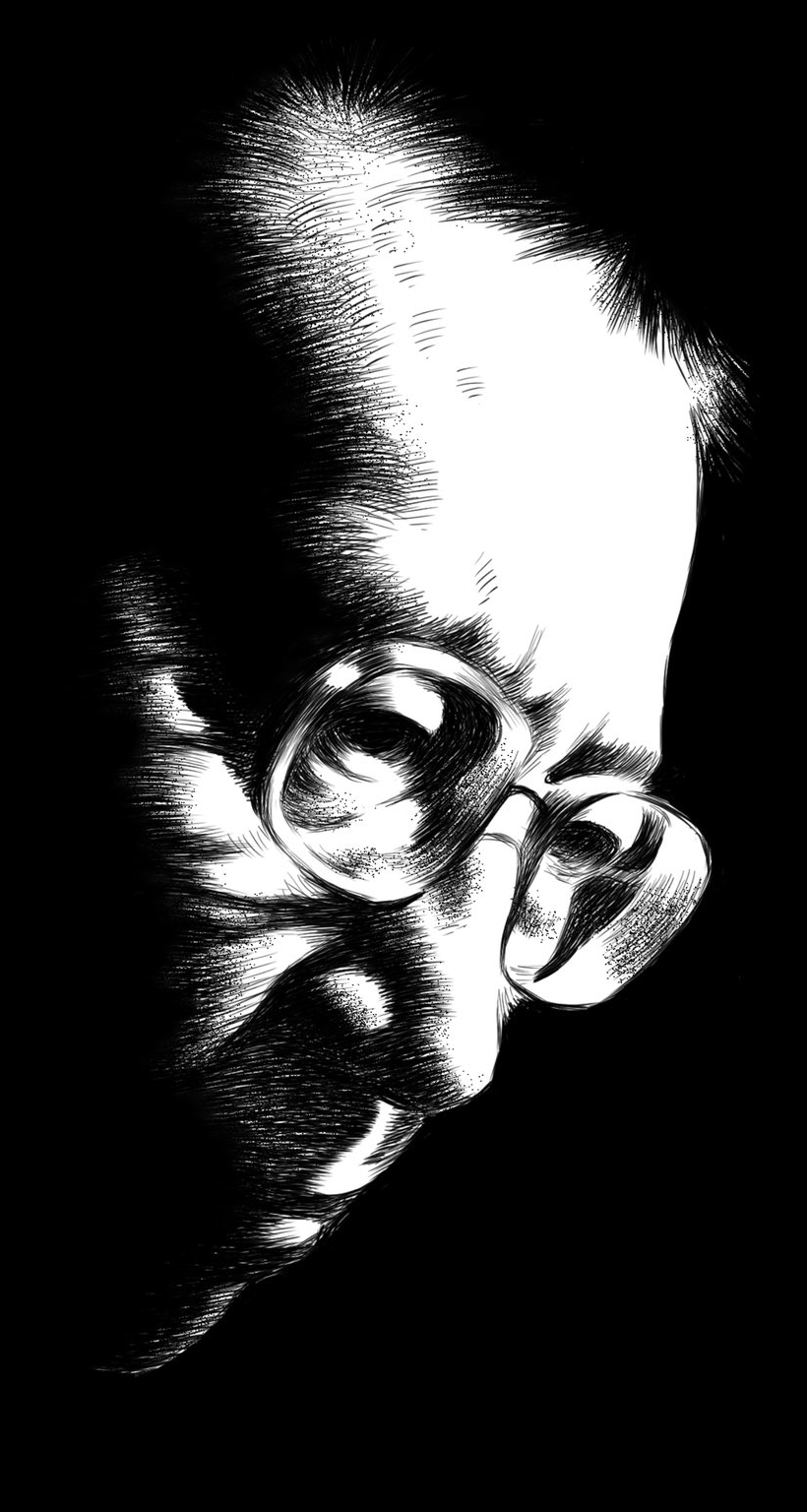
- "for his long and non-violent struggle for fundamental human rights in China."
- Date: 8 October 2010 (announcement by Thorbjørn Jagland); 10 December 2010 (ceremony)
- Location: Oslo, Norway
- Presented by: Norwegian Nobel Committee
- Reward: 10 million SEK ($1.5M)
- First award: 1901
- Website: Official website

The 2010 Nobel Peace Prize was awarded to imprisoned Chinese human rights activist Liu Xiaobo (1955–2017) "for his long and non-violent struggle for fundamental human rights in China". The laureate, once an eminent scholar, was reportedly little-known inside the People's Republic of China (PRC) at the time of the award due to official censorship; he partook in the Tiananmen Square protests of 1989 and was a co-author of the Charter 08 manifesto, for which he was sentenced to 11 years in prison on 25 December 2009. Liu, who was backed by former Czech president Václav Havel and anti-apartheid activist and cleric Desmond Tutu, also a Nobel Peace Prize winner, received the award among a record field of more than 200 nominees.

The decision, while widely praised by foreign intellectuals and politicians, was quickly condemned by the Chinese government and the state media. A number of countries, including Saudi Arabia and Russia, also denounced the award and what they regarded as interference in China's domestic affairs. Following the announcement, official censorship was applied within China—on the Internet, television and in print media. The government strongly denounced the award and summoned the Norwegian ambassador in Beijing to make a formal protest. The Chinese authorities arrested citizens who attempted to celebrate. Liu's wife was put under house arrest before the decision of the Nobel Committee was announced.

Chinese diplomats moved to pressure other countries not to attend the award ceremony, which was scheduled for 10 December. The diplomatic missions of democratic countries in Oslo received warning letters from their Chinese counterparts; the deputy foreign minister also warned countries of "the consequences". In December, the Chinese Foreign Ministry continued the rhetorical assault, stating "more than 100 countries and international organisations [had] expressed explicit support of China's position". In the end, 46 countries attended of the 65 invited (the People's Republic of China and 19 other nations declined invitations). China's official news agency, Xinhua, attacked the West for its "Cold-War or even colonial mentality" and for daring to "regard themselves as the judge, the teacher [who] assume that they can forever distort the fact and block the truth by using political maneuvers." Strong rhetoric and denunciations of the West continued from official sources until after the ceremony.

Liu was the first person of Chinese nationality to be awarded the Nobel Peace Prize and the first to be awarded a Nobel Prize of any kind while residing in China. (Note: Several Chinese scientists have previously received Nobel Prizes for work done outside the country, and Chinese-born French national Gao Xingjian was awarded the Nobel Prize in Literature in 2000.) Liu was the third person to be awarded the Nobel Peace Prize while in prison or detention after Germany's Carl von Ossietzky (1935) and Burma's Aung San Suu Kyi (1991). As the laureate was absent, Liu's place on the podium was unoccupied; Norwegian actress Liv Ullmann read I Have No Enemies, an essay that Liu had written for his trial in December 2009, in place of the acceptance speech.

== Nomination and announcement ==
The Nobel Committee disclosed there were a record number of nominations in 2010—a total of 237, of which 38 were organisations. Although the committee has a policy of keeping nominations confidential for 50 years, some nominators made announcements. Among the nominees were Russian human rights activist Svetlana Gannushkina, the International Space Station, the Internet and its three founders Larry Roberts, Vint Cerf and Tim Berners-Lee. Also on the list were Chinese dissidents Liu Xiaobo, Hu Jia, Gao Zhisheng, Chen Guangcheng, Bao Tong, and Rebiya Kadeer.

Liu was nominated by International PEN, the worldwide association of writers. Interested in Western philosophy, Liu made his reputation as a literary critic with a treatise on the state of modern Chinese literature: an article he published in 1986 that criticised Chinese writers for their dependence on the state, and their deficit in free-thinking, caused a stir in the Chinese literary world. His challenging ideas caught the attention of the intellectuals; he lectured all over China and abroad. He was in New York when the 1989 pro-democracy movement erupted in China; he returned immediately to China and spent most of his time amongst the protesters in Tiananmen Square. This, and his subsequent leadership role in the Charter 08 pro-democracy manifesto for China, led the Chinese authorities to censor his views as subversive. Liu was jailed for 11 years on 25 December 2009, for "inciting subversion of state power". A Chinese Foreign Ministry spokesman said "It would be completely wrong for the Nobel Prize committee to award the prize to [Liu]". In January 2010, Václav Havel and others—including the 14th Dalai Lama, André Glucksmann, Vartan Gregorian, New Zealand politician Mike Moore, Karel Schwarzenberg, Desmond Tutu and Grigory Yavlinsky—published an article endorsing Liu. A professor at the Chinese Academy of Social Sciences, Xu Youyu, and others, addressed an open letter "to the European People" in support of Liu, while 14 exiled dissidents urged the Nobel Committee to pass over Liu's nomination, arguing that Liu had maligned other dissidents, forsaken the oppressed Falun Gong and that his stance against the Chinese leadership had become too "soft".

Agence France-Presse reported that at a June meeting convened by the Chinese embassy in Oslo, Vice Foreign Minister Fu Ying warned the Nobel Institute director and secretary of the Nobel Committee, Geir Lundestad, that giving the prize to Liu Xiaobo would be seen as an "unfriendly gesture" that would have negative consequences for relations between Oslo and Beijing.

On 7 October 2010, Norwegian television networks reported that Liu Xiaobo was the front-running candidate for the Prize. Irish bookmaker Paddy Power paid out two days before the announcement following an increase in bets. Shortly before the announcement, Liu's wife, Liu Xia, declined telephone interviews, saying the police were at her home. Her telephone went unanswered once the announcement was made. Nobel Committee chairman Thorbjørn Jagland made the announcement on 8 October 2010 in Oslo, mentioning that the choice of Liu had become clear early in the process. The monetary component of the prize would be 10 million Swedish kronor (US$1.5 million).

The Norwegian Nobel Committee has decided to award the Nobel Peace Prize for 2010 to Liu Xiaobo for his long and non-violent struggle for fundamental human rights in China. The Norwegian Nobel Committee has long believed that there is a close connection between human rights and peace. Such rights are a prerequisite for the 'fraternity between nations' of which Alfred Nobel wrote in his will ... The campaign to establish universal human rights also in China is being waged by many Chinese, both in China itself and abroad. Through the severe punishment meted out to him, Liu has become the foremost symbol of this wide-ranging struggle for human rights in China.

— Norwegian Nobel Committee, 8 October 2010

At 2 pm on the day of announcement, a crowd of about 100 journalists, supporters, and friends who had gathered outside the main entrance to the Beijing housing estate where the Lius resided were denied entry. The South China Morning Post reported that policemen stationed inside their apartment at the time of the announcement prevented Liu Xia from meeting with journalists and other well-wishers. It was not immediately clear whether Liu Xiaobo was aware of the award. By that time, Liu Xia said she had been told she would be taken to Liaoning to see her husband in prison. Meetings and gatherings to celebrate in several cities were prevented or abruptly broken up by police; one such celebration dinner in Beijing, attended by 20 people, was broken up by police, and the attendees were detained.

== Reactions in Greater China ==
=== Chinese media ===
The Chinese media avoided the story of Liu's Peace Prize, in marked contrast with their previous announcements of other recipients of Nobel Prizes. The official Xinhua News Agency downplayed all but the literature prize, and most other mainland news portals followed the Xinhua lead; popular internet portals such as Sina.com and NetEase deleted pages dedicated to stories related to all five Nobel Prizes. According to a well-informed Twitter user, cited by the China Media Project at the University of Hong Kong, the State Council Information Office issued a directive immediately after the announcement that "Liu Xiaobo" and "Peace Prize" would be prohibited search terms for microblog services across the country; fora, blogs and other interactive media were forbidden from releasing any information. At 6 pm, the source said that although the official news release had been issued, all media were ordered by the Central Propaganda Department not to publish it.

Standard copy on Liu Xiaobo winning the Nobel Peace Prize has been approved for distribution, but all media outlets are not allowed to publish it. This included all print and online media.

— Leaked directive from the Central Propaganda Bureau
8 October 2010

Major domestic newspapers in China had coverage on their inner pages. Guangming Daily, Economic Daily, Beijing Daily, The Beijing News, and Shanghai's Wen Hui Bao published the Xinhua-sanctioned report the following day. China Central Television's main evening news programme, Xinwen Lianbo, did not report on it. Chinese journalists and dissidents said the Central Propaganda Department had instructed media to censor or otherwise under-report on Liu Xiaobo and the peace prize award.

The Chinese government ordered the deletion of all print and broadcast stories on the topic; In an editorial, the Communist Party–run Global Times attacked the Nobel Peace Prize as a "political tool of Western interests" that was being used to foment "endless political strife in Chinese society, causing a Soviet-style breakup." Another Global Times article said the award was "another expression of this prejudice, and behind it lies an extraordinary terror of China's rise and the Chinese model". It said the award was a concerted ideologically motivated attack on China's economic interests by developed nations and foreign business interests who "even hope that China will one day collapse under the West's ideological crusade."

Foreign broadcast coverage, such as from the BBC and CNN, was blacked out whenever Liu was mentioned. In Guangdong, signal carriers for Hong Kong TVB were interrupted for approximately eight minutes during the 6 pm evening news programme, blocking the news item for the Nobel Peace Prize.

After a week of denunciation in China's English-language media, with most journals silent about the award except for perfunctory quotes from the foreign ministry, the country's Chinese-language media launched a concerted assault on Liu and the award, accompanied by renewed attacks in the English-language media. Xinhua argued on 17 October that the Communist Party had made "unremitting efforts to promote and safeguard human rights", and questioned how Liu's actions had contributed to human rights progress for the Chinese people. The agency cited a journal from Saudi Arabia, and one from Russia, that had denounced the award; it quoted the Pakistani Foreign Office as saying, "the politicization of the Nobel Peace Prize for the purposes of interference in the domestic affairs of states is not only contrary to the recognized principles of inter-State conduct, but also a negation of the underlying spirit conceived by the founder of the Prize." In what was described by Chinese media–watchers as a surprise because of its historical professionalism, China Youth Daily published an article containing Beijing students' expressions of anger and disbelief over the decision to award the Nobel Peace Prize to Liu. The journal employed the traditional hard-liner phrase "people with ulterior motives" (别有用心的人)—directed to at least one student. It further denounced the "farcical" Nobel decision to use the award as "a tool ... in their relentless effort to undermine China and frustrate its development".

The Beijing Daily published an editorial on the day of the award ceremony entitled "Why not give the peace prize to Julian Assange?". It suggested that Assange, the head of WikiLeaks, was not awarded the prize because he could not "become a tool for Western forces in attacking countries with different ideologies ... even if this tool is serving out a prison sentence for violating the law."

=== Central government ===
Following the announcement on 8 October 2010, Xinhua relayed the Russian state-owned news agency's denunciation of the prize. China summoned the Norwegian ambassador in Beijing "to officially share their opinion, their disagreement and their protest." A PRC foreign ministry spokesman accused politicians from "some countries" for using the award to further their own political agendas: "This is not only disrespect for China's judicial system but also puts a big question mark on their true intention." The ministry's statement, labelling the decision "a blasphemy", was carried on Chinese state television.

The Nobel Peace Prize should be awarded to people who contribute to national harmony, country-to-country friendship, advancing disarmament, and convening and propagandizing peace conferences. Liu was a criminal sentenced by the Chinese judicial authorities for violating Chinese law ... The Nobel committee's decision to award such a person the peace prize runs contrary to and desecrates the prize.

— Ma Zhaoxu, Chinese Foreign Ministry spokesman, 8 October 2010

China protested to Norway, saying that China–Norway relations had been damaged. A planned meeting in Beijing between Norwegian Fisheries Minister Lisbeth Berg-Hansen and Chinese food control authorities was cancelled at the last minute, ostensibly because their counterparts had "other engagements"; Norwegian officials said that a meeting, due to be held the same day between Berg-Hansen and the Chinese vice-minister for fisheries, had been cancelled in reaction to the award. Elsewhere, performances of a Norwegian musical starring Alexander Rybak scheduled for the following month also fell victim to the diplomatic fallout, according to the composer. In early December, Norway said its bilateral trade talks with China had been delayed indefinitely. Haakon Hjelde, Norway's negotiator, reported that the postponement was not directly linked to the award, but Henning Kristofferson, director of international relations of the BI Norwegian School of Management, said it was fairly obvious that the PRC government would "never hold a high-level meeting with Norway shortly before or after the award ceremony", having made it plain that the award to Liu was "a big mistake".

=== Law enforcement ===
In the days immediately preceding the award ceremony, foreign media reported that Liu's home was under tight security. By what a correspondent for The Guardian called "a peculiar coincidence", construction barriers were erected on both sides of the road at the southern entrance of the residential complex which obscured the estate. Police cars were positioned on every nearby street corner; uniformed and plain-clothes police officers patrolled outside the apartment block, and a radio surveillance vehicle was stationed at the entrance to the compound. Neighbouring businesses were affected: the owner of a nearby restaurant was quoted as saying government officials had told him to close the business temporarily.

Liu Xia was under house-arrest almost immediately after the announcement, and was escorted to Liaoning to visit her imprisoned husband. She reported that she was denied visitors, her telephones were repeatedly down, and complained that even her elderly mother had not been able to get through to her. Visitors were denied entrance to her residential compound, including Norwegian diplomats who had tried to visit her on 12 October; she was able to send out a few messages through Twitter. Chinese police stationed there cordoned off the area. Thus, journalists and well-wishers were kept at bay for several hours after the announcement; as she was being taken away to see her husband, Reuters heard her say "they are forcing me to leave Beijing". Dissident groups reported on 18 October that numerous supporters and associates of Liu may have been detained by police—that Tiananmen Mother Ding Zilin, and her husband Jiang Peikun, had not been seen or heard of for four days, and that their phones were cut off. Writer Jiang Qisheng went missing just days after the Nobel announcement.

As exiled prominent activists and former activists were reportedly preparing to attend the award ceremony, some prominent individuals and activists inside China experienced travel problems. Economist Mao Yushi (who had signed Charter 08), Ai Weiwei, and the human-rights lawyer Liu Xiaoyuan were all barred from outbound travel at Beijing's airport, ostensibly because their departure from China could "endanger state security". Liu's lawyer, Mo Shaoping, and Peking University law professor He Weifang were stopped from boarding their flight to London in November. The South China Morning Post reported that even the spouses and children of some outspoken intellectuals experienced outbound travel restrictions. Ai speculated that the refusal to let him board a flight for Korea may have been directly connected with the following week's prize-giving ceremony. Chinese Human Rights Defenders also believed that "officials are increasing their efforts to bar prominent members of Chinese civil society from travelling internationally as the Nobel Peace Prize ceremony approaches." The BBC, citing the UN, said there was information that China had detained at least 20 activists prior to the ceremony; it reported sources saying that 120 more activists were subjected to house arrest, travel restrictions, forced relocations, or "other acts of intimidation" ahead of the ceremony; external Chinese sources put the figure of people so restricted at approximately 270.

=== Liu Xia and Liu Xiaobo ===
Liu Xia expressed her gratitude to the Nobel Committee, Liu's proposers, and those who have been supporting him since 1989, including the Tiananmen Mothers—family members or representatives of those who were killed, or had disappeared, in the military crackdown of the protests of 4 June 1989. She said, "The prize should belong to all who signed Charter 08 and were jailed due to their support".

Liu Xia informed the laureate of his award during a visit to Jinzhou Prison on 9 October 2010, one day after the official announcement. She reported that Liu wept and dedicated the award to those who suffered as a result of the Tiananmen Square protests of 1989, saying: "The award is first and foremost for the Tiananmen martyrs" After Ms. Liu returned home, she was put under house arrest and was watched by armed guards. She expressed the desire to attend the prize-giving in Norway in December, but was sceptical of her chances of being allowed to do so. Liu Xia wrote an open letter to 143 prominent figures, encouraging them to attend the award ceremony in Oslo.

=== Intellectuals ===
We're calling upon Chinese authorities to respond to the peace prize with rationality and realism, and to take stock of warm responses from home and abroad to gain clear understanding of the world's opinion and where people have placed their hearts.

— Open letter from mainland intellectuals urging Beijing government to release Liu Xiaobo

John Pomfret of The Washington Post said a wide spectrum of Chinese and foreigners believed that Liu's award "could actually resonate more deeply within China than any similar act in years". The open letter by Xu Youyu et al., which described Liu as "a splendid choice" because of his advancement of human rights causes and the peaceful fight against social injustice, amassed signatures from about 200 mainland intellectuals and activists; it was posted in Chinese, English, French and Japanese on websites hosted outside China. Artist and critic Ai Weiwei said that, although the regime ought to feel the most ashamed, "intellectuals who had drifted away from their public responsibilities" should bear some of that burden for betraying values they once strove for. Ai said that the Prize was a message from the international community to the Chinese government to respect universal human values, notwithstanding China's economic performance. Writer Liao Yiwu, a close friend of Liu, described it as "a big moment in Chinese history". Another writer, Yu Jie, said he spent the night awake with tears streaming down his face – "Twenty years ago Liu Xiaobo said that China needed someone with moral clarity about what China needs. Now he has become just that person, that he himself was looking for", he said. Former Chinese diplomat Yang Hengjun described it as a strong signal to the Chinese government to speed up political reform "or you will have a lot of enemies around you and within you."

Exiled 1989 student leader Wang Dan said he was "ecstatic". Human rights lawyer Li Heping called the award "huge encouragement for the Chinese people ... an affirmation that there are people around the world who really care about human rights and the legal system in China, that the world hasn't forgotten us." He added that others, such as Gao Zhisheng, Chen Guangcheng, and Hu Jia, also deserved the prize. The Globe and Mail said that while many activists agreed he was worthy of the award, some radical reformers within Chinese democracy movement, such as Wei Jingsheng, see the moderate Liu as the wrong choice due to his advocacy of a gradual path to constitutional democracy in China.

Renmin University professor Zhang Ming felt the award would not have much direct impact. However, economist Mao Yushi believed that there were many factors affecting political reform in China. He stated that the prize was an impetus from the international community for the process of reform that was already under way, and that the impact of the award to Liu would be felt by the current generation of leaders, and beyond.

=== Internet community ===
Liu was once an eminent scholar, but was reportedly little-known inside the People's Republic of China (PRC) at the time of the award due to official censorship. Those who had heard about Liu had mixed views about him. Some clearly supported the government position, whereas one university student was quoted as saying "George Orwell probably had no idea that what he wrote would end up being the reality of China now." "Liu Xiaobo" and "Nobel Peace Prize" became the most searched terms among internet users in China. However, some time after the release of the official response from the Chinese Foreign Ministry, government censors screened the news item, and there were reports of searches in China using Chinese search engines returning error pages. Web searches using Chinese search engines for "Liu Xiaobo" in Chinese without attaching the words "Peace Prize", gave information about Liu. Yet most sites found "Liu" plus "Peace Prize" yield only the official foreign ministry response. CNN reported that any mention of "Nobel Prize" on microblogging sites was censored. One person claimed that his SIM card was deactivated after he sent a text message to a relative about the Nobel Peace Prize. Accustomed to circumventing Chinese internet censorship, bloggers and forum-users used variants of Liu's name and posted subtle or cryptic messages to express their elation about the award or sarcasm towards the state. The statement on 8 October by blogger Han Han consisted of only a pair of double quote marks.

Less than three weeks after the announcement of the award to Liu, the Nobel Peace Prize website came under a cyber attack. There was an attempt to hack into the computer of the secretary of the Nobel Committee, Geir Lundestad by a forged email on 3 November. A number of individuals received an email containing a trojan horse purportedly disguised as a pdf-file invitation to the award ceremony from the Oslo Freedom Forum. Investigators traced both the attack and the email to an intermediate server reportedly in a Taiwanese university. Experts say the address had been falsified, and the exact origin was unknown; it was emphasised that no link to any party in mainland China could be established. After activists posted photographs of a symbolic empty chair on Internet fora and noticeboards, censors responded by removing the images and making "empty chair" a banned search term.

=== Hong Kong ===
Many political groups—including the Democratic Party and the Hong Kong Journalists Association—welcomed the decision and congratulated Liu. The Journalists Association expressed their gratitude and encouragement for Liu's award, and their hope for the early unconditional release of Liu. Hong Kong's Chief Executive, Donald Tsang, and government ministers Leung Chun-ying, and Gregory So, all declined to comment to the press.

The South China Morning Post in Hong Kong said Liu's courage to stand up for the rights of all people—for the fourth time since the 1989 Tiananmen Square protests—made him worthy of joining the company of other similarly persecuted peace prize recipients such as Nelson Mandela: "Liu is just one of a long line of like-minded Chinese citizens to be silenced. The award will be seen in many quarters as acknowledging their sacrifice for the values it upholds." Hong Kong-based Phoenix Television, which transmits throughout mainland China by satellite, limited its report to the foreign ministry's statement denouncing the honour.

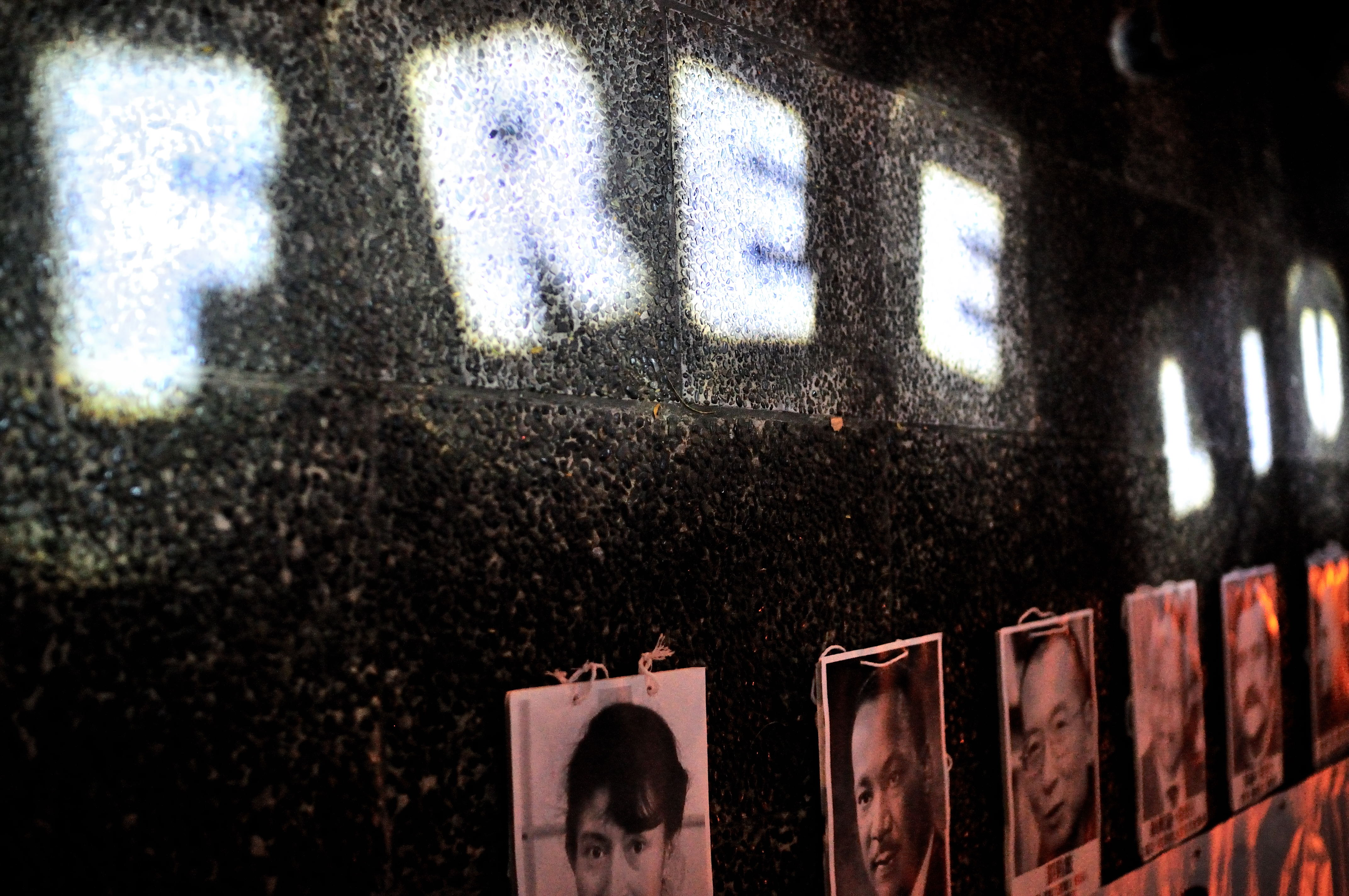
A light vigil held at Chater Garden, Hong Kong

About twenty activists held a celebration in front of the central government liaison office. Their celebration was broken up and the activists were arrested for assault after a guard was accidentally sprayed with champagne. A human rights monitor, and a Democratic Party legislator, denounced the "absurd" reaction of the police. The Speaker of Hong Kong's legislature turned down an adjournment motion on 15 October submitted by Leung Kwok-hung that called for the release of Liu on grounds that such debate "lacked urgency and would not produce irreversible consequences". On 17 October, thirty supporters of the Hong Kong Alliance in Support of Patriotic Democratic Movements in China—organisers of the annual commemoration of the 1989 Tiananmen protests—held a march to the central government liaison office, calling on the central government to release Liu and allow him to attend the prize-giving in December. A candlelight ceremony was held in the city's central business district to coincide with the award ceremony; organisers said 1,000 people attended.

The Chinese-language press reported on rumours that Chinese officials had approached high-level executives at TVB and CableTV, asking them not to broadcast the ceremony live on their channels; executives affirmed their plans to broadcast—scheduling for the event was immutable. TVB News and now TV executives categorically denied having been contacted by Chinese authorities to pull the plug on coverage. An editorial in the South China Morning Post said: "this heavy-handed reaction [to Liu's award] is counterproductive to [China's] image and the respect it wants as a peaceful superpower. Liu's award did pose a dilemma, but having made its point at the outset Beijing had little further to gain. Attempts to meddle in the process did nothing to dignify its stand."

=== Taiwan ===
One day after the award announcement, President Ma Ying-jeou's office urged China to exercise greater tolerance of dissidents; the president himself pleaded for the release of Liu, to "solve major human rights incidents with honesty and confidence." Forty-eight non-governmental organisations jointly issued a two-page statement expressing optimism for political change in China. The statement said that the world "stands in solidarity with [the] Chinese people who share Liu's vision for a strong, prosperous and above all, democratic, China."

The Taipei Times said the award suggested strong support for China's democracy movement, and predicted the inevitability of change. "The CCP needs to decide whether to attempt to obstruct democracy or facilitate its development. If it chooses the former then history will pass it by, just as it did the Communist Party of the Soviet Union. If, however, the CCP decides to embrace change then it could ... remain a political force" like the Kuomintang in Taiwan.

== International reaction ==
=== Norway ===
In advance of an official Chinese response to the Nobel Committee's decision, Norwegian foreign minister Jonas Gahr Støre said that a Chinese complaint to the Norwegian government would be in vain, since the committee is independent of the Norwegian government, even though it is appointed by the Parliament of Norway. This official position was reiterated to the People's Republic of China by their Norwegian ambassador. After the announcement, Prime Minister Jens Stoltenberg said the decision "directs a spotlight on the human rights situation in China, and underscores the links between development, democracy and universal human rights." Norway summoned the Chinese ambassador to Norway to express its regret at China's reaction, to urge for the release of Liu, and to remove restrictions on his wife. The Norwegian newspaper Aftenposten revealed that Foreign Minister Støre had a pre-emptive meeting with Nobel Committee chairman Thorbjørn Jagland, about Liu as the expected recipient, two weeks before the announcement. According to anonymous sources within both the Foreign Ministry and the Nobel Committee itself, Støre is said to have raised certain "concerns". The Norwegian press quoted Jagland as saying that this enquiry was of such a peculiar kind that he would have to present the Nobel Committee with the minutes of the meeting. Former Nobel Committee chairman Ole Danbolt Mjøs and a number of Norwegian researchers and politicians criticised Støre for breaching protocol and meddling in the work of the committee.

Norwegian peace activist and author, Fredrik S. Heffermehl criticised the Nobel Committee for failing to follow Alfred Nobel's dying wish to promote disarmament, by giving the award to Liu. Heffermehl said that less than 50 percent of the awards made after World War II had been made in accordance with Nobel's will.

=== Governments and politicians ===
Leading politicians in the Western world welcomed the news and called for the release of Liu. The European Union and member governments praised the decision, and also called on China to release Liu. European Commission President José Manuel Barroso stated that "the decision of the Nobel Peace Prize Committee is a strong message of support to all those around the world who, sometimes with great personal sacrifice, are struggling for freedom and human rights." The Polish foreign ministry said it was appreciative of the decision to award Liu. Japan greeted the award and emphasised the need for respect of human rights, but did not call for Liu's release; Premier Naoto Kan told a parliamentary committee Liu's release was "desirable". The Australian prime minister, Julia Gillard, said Australia was strongly against Liu's imprisonment, and "welcome[d] the fact that his work has been recognised internationally now with the Nobel Peace Prize", while the Australian Greens leader Bob Brown described the decision as "inspiring". Brown contrasted Norway's courage with the "sheer ignorance and gutlessness of most of Australia's politicians on the plight of campaigning democrats in China". The Canadian prime minister Stephen Harper expressed his delight, and said he hoped the award "would cause our friends in the Chinese government to look seriously at that issue of his release from prison."

UN Secretary-General Ban Ki-moon recognised China's "remarkable economic advances [that have] lifted millions out of poverty", and said he hoped "any differences on this decision will not detract from advancement of the human rights agenda globally or the high prestige and inspirational power of the award". President of the United States Barack Obama lauded Liu's eloquence and courage, while his government called for his immediate release.

Non-aligned and developing countries such as Russia, Brazil and India, many Asian and Middle Eastern countries were silent. The Cuban and Venezuelan governments were notably critical. Venezuelan President Hugo Chavez sided with China, saying the award should be given to those who "have done the most for fraternity between nations, the abolition or reduction of standing armies and promotion of peace congresses". Pakistan and Cuba denounced the choice, saying Liu was exactly "the type of 'dissident' that the United States has been designing for decades to use ... as fifth columns in those countries that they disagree with because those countries dissent from [American] hegemony." The United Arab Emirates expressed regret over the "politically motivated" decision to award Liu, which it said was "against the UAE's fundamental belief in respecting other nations' sovereignty and non-interference."

On 8 December, the United States House of Representatives voted by 402 to 1 to congratulate Liu and honour his "promotion of democratic reform in China, and the courage with which he has borne repeated imprisonment ... and [call] on the government of China to cease censoring media and internet reporting of the award of the Nobel Peace Prize to Liu Xiaobo and to cease its campaign of defamation against Liu Xiaobo." The Chinese Foreign Ministry responded by accusing US lawmakers of possessing an "arrogant and unreasonable attitude" and "lacking respect for China's judicial sovereignty." Ahead of the award ceremony, Barack Obama said "Mr Liu Xiaobo is far more deserving of this award than I was ... [He] reminds us that human dignity also depends upon the advance of democracy, open society, and the rule of law ... The values he espouses are universal, his struggle is peaceful, and he should be released as soon as possible."

=== Human rights groups and academics ===
The Dalai Lama expressed confidence that China would one day enjoy responsible governance through the efforts of Liu and others calling for democracy and freedom. He praised the award as "the international community's recognition of the increasing voices among the Chinese people in pushing China towards political, legal and constitutional reforms." Former Polish president Lech Wałęsa said he was "very satisfied", describing the award as "a challenge for China and the entire world, [which] must declare whether it is ready to help China enter a zone where there is respect for the principles and values".

However, Andre Geim and Konstantin Novoselov, who were awarded the 2010 Nobel Prize in Physics, attacked the Nobel committee as "retired Norwegian politicians who have spent all their careers in a safe environment, in an oil-rich modern country. They try to extend their views of the world, how the world should work and how democracy works in another country." They also felt that China should be given due credit for undisputed improvements in human rights and the economy over the last 10 years. Novoselov questioned: "What is a dictatorship? It is not as if people are being constantly killed there," The pair were rebutted by 2010 Nobel literature laureate Mario Vargas Llosa, who said it was a timely reminder that China was still a dictatorship and quite monolithic regarding politics, and that the award was "a tribute to all Chinese dissidents and all Chinese who want not just economic but also political growth and progress in China."

Human Rights Watch said the 2010 award honours "all those in China who struggle daily to make the government more accountable" and "shatter[s] the myth where the Communist Party presents itself as the voice of the Chinese people". Canadian academic Professor Josephine Chiu-Duke believed that many Communist Party members were "hoping that China can be free, democratic and civilized", and hoped that the award would "encourag[e] more Chinese to speak up." Former British diplomat in Beijing, Kerry Brown, lamented that, economically powerful though China is, its sole Nobel laureate languished in prison.

The Secretary General of Amnesty International, said: "the Chinese government might see this is as a victory, but they would be mistaken ... Because, while the other chairs in the packed hall on the day of the awards ceremony will each hold only one person, Liu's empty chair will hold ... the thousands of political prisoners and prisoners of conscience [who were] victims of prosecution and persecution simply for having the courage to voice their views." On the other hand, in an article appearing in China Daily, David Gosset of the China Europe International Business School said the award was "a sad paradox, a prize without any real winner, which generates mistrust and perplexity when understanding and clarity are most needed". Gosset believed that only citizens were able to define the exact terms and pace of democratisation in their own country, and lamented the "fallacy" of implicitly associating the PRC with German Nazism or South African apartheid, and emphasised that China, a developing country with a per capita GDP of $3,700, could hardly adopt the socio-political standards of the developed world without attenuating its development. He also argued that the choice of Liu was divisive in view of China's memory of Western imperialism, and of Alfred Nobel's dying wish to reward a person "who shall have done the most or the best work for fraternity between nations". Professor Sidney Rittenberg said: "One does not have to approve of Mr Liu's imprisonment in order to disapprove of his choice as a Nobel laureate ... Not only have courageous, intelligent individuals like Mr Liu made no tangible contribution to China's advance, not only have their activities and his choice for a Nobel Prize made life more difficult for China's dissidents—but the main point is that his advocacy of a multiparty system for the China of today would almost certainly lead to disaster, if carried out. To wit, Iran after the overthrow of the shah."

=== Media ===
State-owned Russian news agency RIA Novosti immediately criticised the prize as a "political tool"—a denunciation swiftly picked up and relayed by Xinhua. Radio Free Europe reported Solidarnost (in Russia) planned to hold a public rally in support of Liu in Saint Petersburg, but the authorities refused permission. In the end, 10 activists staged a protest outside the Chinese consulate there.

In an editorial, The Guardian said "to many western ears, the clamour of China's markets is louder than the pleas of its dissidents. The Nobel committee is one of few institutions with sufficient status to be heard around the world. Its most coveted prize can now amplify Mr Liu's voice." The Telegraph said that the award was justified not only by Liu's own courage, but was "a rebuke to Western governments, so hypnotised by China's riches and cowed by self-interest that they have shut their eyes and ears to the regime's abuses of human rights."

The New York Times applauded the award: "Beijing is used to throwing its weight around these days—on currency, trade, the South China Sea and many other issues. Too many governments, and companies, are afraid to push back. Maybe someone in China's leadership will now figure out that bullying is not a strategy for an aspiring world power." The French daily, Libération, referred to Liu as "the Chinese Havel", saying "the Chinese government wanted to show the world that nothing would stop it from silencing its critics. However, China is today a part of the international community, and must respect the norms it accepted when it signed up for UN membership. The pressure it exerted upon the Nobel prize committee not to award Liu is unacceptable."

On the other hand, an article in The Guardian pointed out Liu's support for "the total westernisation of China" amongst other policies, such as the US invasion of Iraq, and on the tenor of the debate in the West: "Liu Xiaobo's politics have been reduced to a story of a heroic individual who upholds human rights and democracy. His views are largely omitted to avoid a discussion about them, resulting in a one-sided debate." Its survey of 500 press articles published in Hong Kong about Liu showed "only 10 were critical of the man or peace prize."

News agencies reported the Confucius Peace Prize, established at the suggestion of Global Times in response to the award of the Nobel Peace Prize to a jailed dissident. The organiser denied any involvement of the Chinese government in the award and the Minister of Culture said they only became aware of the prize due to the press coverage. Hong Kong's Ming Pao, which had obtained a copy of the letter from the organisers of the Confucius award to the 'winner', suggested that this was indeed unofficial—the letter did not bear the Ministry of Culture's official seal. Die Welt said the rival award was "stupid".

The Economist recalled how the Soviet Union prevented Andrei Sakharov from accepting his Nobel Peace Prize in 1975, and suggested that Chinese leadership would probably have expected such a comparison. Both it and Die Welt made direct reference to the creation of a similar German National Prize for Art and Science by Nazi Germany after von Ossietzky was prohibited from leaving the country to collect the 1935 prize.

=== Other Nobel Prize laureates ===
4 December 2012, 134 Nobel Prize laureates wrote to new General Secretary of Communist Party Xi Jinping, calling for the immediate release of Liu Xiaobo and the lifting of the house arrest of his wife Liu Xia.

== Runup to the Award ceremony ==
=== Diplomatic pressure ===
A large number of countries turned down an invitation to attend the 2010 Nobel Peace Prize ceremony. Blue means the country attended, while red signifies the country did not.

In the lead-up to the award ceremony, the Chinese authorities began a campaign through state media to criticise both Liu and the prize; the Chinese foreign service in Beijing and abroad targeted Western government officials, urging them to stay away from the award ceremony in Oslo on 10 December and refrain from issuing any statements of support for Liu. At least two European embassies in Norway were sent letters by their Chinese counterparts, denouncing the prize for being an interference in China's internal affairs and reaffirming their stance that Liu had committed crimes in China. One diplomat said his embassy's letter from the Chinese embassy requested obliquely that they "refrain from attending any activity directed against China." The Norwegian Nobel Committee said its invitation to the Chinese ambassador to attend the prize-giving was returned unanswered. The Chinese Vice Foreign Minister also warned countries supporting Liu's award that they would have to "take responsibility for the consequences".

In December, the Chinese foreign ministry continued to denounce the award as "interference by a few clowns". It said "more than 100 countries and international organisations [had] expressed explicit support of China's position opposing this year's peace prize." However, according to the Nobel Committee, only the 65 countries with diplomatic missions were invited; acceptances had been received from 46 countries, including the previously non-committal India, while China and 19 others—Afghanistan, Algeria, Argentina, Cuba, Egypt, Iran, Iraq, Kazakhstan, Morocco, Nepal, Pakistan, Russia, Saudi Arabia, Sri Lanka, Sudan, Tunisia, Venezuela and Vietnam—declined invitations to the award ceremony "for various reasons". On the eve of the award ceremony, China continued the rhetoric against the Nobel Committee and the West. A spokesman said: "We hope that those countries who have received invitations can tell right from wrong and uphold justice. It's not an issue of human rights. It's an issue of interfering in other countries' internal affairs"; the Nobel committee continued to be criticised for "encouraging crime"; the Global Times repeated earlier suggestions that the award was a Western conspiracy against Beijing, a "charge against China's ideology, aiming to undermine the benign surroundings for China's future development."

Colombia, Serbia, the Philippines and Ukraine initially announced they would not attend the ceremony, but later accepted the invitation. The Philippines ultimately did not attend: President Benigno Aquino III defended the Philippine non-attendance as "in our national interest"; the Philippine government, which had been heavily criticised in its national press for its decision, revealed its hope that China would show clemency to five Filipinos on death row for drug trafficking.

=== Award ceremony ===
The award ceremony, held as planned in Oslo City Hall on the afternoon of 10 December, was attended by about 1,000 VIPs, diplomats and guests. Representing Norway were King Harald V, Queen Sonja and a number of politicians and officials; among the 48 foreign dignitaries was the US House Speaker, Nancy Pelosi. The Chinese group was 46-strong, and included astrophysicist Professor Fang Lizhi, Yang Jianli, and exiled former Tiananmen student leaders Chai Ling, Wu'erkaixi, Feng Congde, and Fang Zheng, whose legs were crushed by a tank; the Hong Kong delegation comprised Albert Ho, Emily Lau, and Lee Cheuk-yan. Outside the hall, pro-democracy and human rights activists demonstrated; about 50 China supporters held a protest outside the Norwegian Parliament.

I, filled with optimism, look forward to the advent of a future, free China. For there is no force that can put an end to the human quest for freedom, and China will in the end become a nation ruled by law, where human rights reign supreme.

— Liu Xiaobo I Have No Enemies
23 December 2009

The hall was decked with an immense portrait of Liu for the event. During the ceremony, the Nobel committee chairman Thorbjørn Jagland credited China's leaders with the "extraordinary" economic transformation that has lifted millions of people out of poverty, but said they "must regard criticism as positive" considering the nation's new status as a world power. Liu's award marks the third occasion that the Prize has been bestowed upon a person in prison or detention, after Carl von Ossietzky (1935) and Aung San Suu Kyi (1991); Liu and Ossietzky were the only ones not to be present or represented by close family at the awards ceremony. The Nobel diploma and the prize were symbolically placed by Jagland on an empty chair meant for the absent laureate. Norwegian actress Liv Ullmann read I Have No Enemies, an essay by Liu written for his trial in December 2009. Chinese-American violinist Lynn Chang performed two Chinese melodies: "Jasmine Flower" and "Colorful Clouds Chasing the Moon."

The proceedings were televised by the international media, but broadcast signals of CNN and BBC inside China were reportedly blocked. Images of and references to 'empty chair' also became the target of official censorship. After the ceremony, the official Chinese news agency, Xinhua, continued the rhetoric against the award:

There are always some who cling to the Cold-War or even colonial mentality, even in this 21st century. They regard themselves as the judge, the teacher, even though they have never been selected by the people of developing countries. They have never experienced the real life in developing countries, but they tend to act like the Savior wherever they go. They assume that they can forever distort the fact and block the truth by using political maneuvers.

— Xia Dongmei
Xinhua, 11 December 2010

Following the ceremony, an evening rally of more than 1,000 people in Oslo called for Liu's release. The marchers headed for the Grand Hotel, where laureates traditionally greet the crowd from the balcony. Assembled Chinese activists and dissidents said they were inspired by the award, that it was a much-needed morale-booster, and expressed hope that it would be a catalyst to resurrect the moribund Chinese pro-democracy movement. Yang Jianli said: "The most important change is the change in people's hearts ... this is the greatest achievement [of this award]," The Global Times said of the ceremony: "It's unimaginable that such a farce, the like of which is more commonly seen in cults, is being staged on the civilised continent of Europe". On the other hand, a huge image with three empty chairs and five cranes adorned the front page the edition of 12 December of the Southern Metropolis Daily; ambiguously, the headline read: "2010 Asian Para Games Are Ready to Start Tonight in Guangzhou". China Digital Times offered the interpretation that 'crane' in Chinese (he) is a homonym for 'congratulations' and the first character of 'peace'.

The Nobel Peace Prize Concert to commemorate the 2010 prize was held on 11 December, the night following the award ceremony, as is the tradition. It was hosted by Denzel Washington and Anne Hathaway. The roster of confirmed performers announced before the award included Herbie Hancock, Florence and the Machine, Colbie Caillat, Elvis Costello. Those who were confirmed later included Barry Manilow, Jamiroquai, A. R. Rahman, India.Arie, Robyn and Sivert Høyem.
