= Geneva Summit for Human Rights and Democracy =

Annual human rights summit

The Geneva Summit for Human Rights and Democracy is an annual human rights summit sponsored by a coalition of 20 non-governmental organizations. Each year, on the eve of the United Nations Human Rights Council's main annual session, activists from around the world meet to raise international awareness of human rights situations.

== History ==
=== 2009 ===
The first summit took place on Sunday, April 19, 2009, prior to the United Nations Durban Review Conference. Speakers included, among others, Iranian activist Nazanin Afshin Jam; Egyptian dissident Saad Eddin Ibrahim; American human rights activist Ellen Bork; Gibreil Hamid of Darfur, Sudan; Soe Aung of Burma; Marlon Zakeyo of Zimbabwe; Cuban opposition activist and former political prisoner José Gabriel Ramón Castillo; and Venezuelan activist Gonzalo Himiob Santome.

=== 2010 ===
The 2010 summit took place on Monday, March 8, 2010. Speakers included, among others, Massouda Jalal, former Afghan Minister of Women's Affairs; exiled Uyghur leader Rebiya Kadeer; Bob Boorstin, Google's policy director; Caspian Makan, fiancé of slain Iranian icon Neda Agha Soltan; Cuban dissident José Gabriel Ramón Castillo; and Bo Kyi of Burma, a former political prisoner and secretary of the Assistance Association for Political Prisoners.

=== 2011 ===
The 2011 summit took place on Tuesday, March 15, 2011. Speakers included, among others, Ugandan LGBT rights activist Jacqueline Kasha; Cuban dissident Luis Enrique Ferrer Garcia; Guang-il Jung, a North Korean labor camp escapee; Turkmenistani activist Farid Tukhbatullin; North Korean activist Cheong Kwang Il; and Libyan dissident Mohamed Eljahmi.

=== 2012 ===
The 2012 summit took place on Tuesday, March 13, 2012. Speakers included, among others, Chinese dissidents Yang Jianli and Ren Wanding; Cuban activist Néstor Rodríguez Lobaina; Zimbabwean activist Jestina Mukoko; Burmese activist Zoya Phan; former Egyptian political prisoner Maikel Nabil; North Korean defectors Joo-il Kim and Song Ju Kim; Iranian activist Ebrahim Mehtari; and Syrian activist Hadeel Kouki.

=== 2013 ===
The 2013 summit took place on Tuesday, February 19, 2013. Speakers included, among others, Pakistani women's rights activist Mukhtar Mai; Moroccan writer and atheist Kacem El Ghazzali; Tibetan politician Dicki Chhoyang; Syrian politician Randa Kassis; former Cuban political prisoner Régis Iglesias; Iranian dissident Marina Nemat; Pyotr Verzilov, husband of jailed Pussy Riot member Nadezhda Tolokonnikova; and Kazakh journalist Lukpan Akhmedyarov.

=== 2014 ===
The 2014 summit took place on Tuesday, February 25, 2014. Speakers included, among others, Mauritanian anti-slavery activist Biram Dah Abeid; Tibetan MP Tenzin Dhardon Sharling; Chinese political dissident Yang Jianli; Canadian MP and human rights lawyer Irwin Cotler; North Korean human rights activist Ahn Myong Chul; Naghmeh Abedini, wife of imprisoned Iranian-American pastor Saeed Abedini; and the aunt of imprisoned Venezuelan opposition leader Leopoldo López.

The summit's Courage Award was given to Chinese dissident Chen Guangcheng, who was the keynote speaker.

=== 2015 ===
The 2015 summit took place on Tuesday, February 24, 2015. Speakers included, among others, Yeonmi Park, a North Korean defector and human rights activist; Lim Il, a North Korean defector and former slave laborer; a Nigerian teenager, identified simply as "Saa", who escaped after being abducted by Boko Haram; Hong Kong protest leaders Alex Chow and Lester Shum; Pierre Torres, a French journalist who was held hostage by ISIS for ten months; Turkish journalist Yavuz Baydar; Moroccan politician Fouzia Elbayed; and Tibetan politician Dicki Chhoyang.

The summit's Courage Award was given to Raif Badawi, an imprisoned Saudi Arabian writer and activist, and accepted on his behalf by Elham Manea, Professor at the University of Zurich. The Women's Rights Award was given to Masih Alinejad, an Iranian journalist and the founder of My Stealthy Freedom.

=== 2016 ===
The 2016 summit took place on Tuesday, February 23, 2016. Speakers included, among others, Ensaf Haidar, wife of jailed Saudi Arabian blogger Raif Badawi; Anastasia Lin, Miss World Canada 2015 and an advocate for human rights in China; Vian Dakhil, Iraqi politician and ISIS victim's advocate; Svitlana Zalishchuk, a Ukrainian politician and key figure in the Euromaidan movement of 2013; Darya Safai, a Belgian-Iranian women's rights advocate; Orhan Kemal Cengiz, a Turkish human rights advocate; Lee Young-guk, a former bodyguard of Kim Jong-il who defected to South Korea; Polina Nemirovskaia, Russian human rights activist; David Trimble, former First Minister of Northern Ireland; and Chinese dissident Yang Jianli.

The summit's Courage Award was given to jailed Venezuelan opposition leaders Antonio Ledezma and Leopoldo López. Relatives of the two men accepted the award on their behalf. The 2016 Women's Rights award went to Vian Dakhil, the only female Yazidi member of Iraqi Parliament, and Jan Ilhan Kizilhan, a German-born psychologist who founded a clinic in Iraq for women victims of the Islamic State.

=== 2017 ===
The 2017 summit took place on Tuesday, February 21, 2017. Speakers included Hillel Neuer, executive director of UN Watch; Irwin Cotler, chair of the Raoul Wallenberg Centre for Human Rights; Jakub Klepal, executive director of Forum 2000; Can Dündar, exiled Turkish journalist; Zhanna Nemtsova, Russian journalist and activist; Anastasia Zotova, Russian activist and wife of Ildar Dadin; Antonietta Ledezma, daughter of imprisoned Venezuelan politician Antonio Ledezma; Chito Gascon, Filipino activist; Taghi Rahmani, Iranian journalist and husband of Narges Mohammadi; Alfred H. Moses, chair of UN Watch; El Sexto, Cuban graffiti artist and activist; Nyima Lhamo, exiled Tibetan activist and niece of Tenzin Delek Rinpoche; Biram Dah Abeid, Mauritanian anti-slavery activist; Astrid Thors, Finnish politician; Mohamed Nasheed, Maldivian activist; Medard Mulangala, DRC opposition leader; James Jones, documentary filmmaker; Kim Kwang-jin, North Korean defector; and Đặng Xuân Diệu, Vietnamese human rights activist.

The 2017 Women's Rights Award was given to "Shirin", a Yazidi woman who escaped sexual slavery in the Islamic State, and author of I Remain a Daughter of the Light (Ich bleibe eine Tocher des Lichts), recently published in Germany. The 2017 Courage Award was given to Mohamed Nasheed, former president of the Maldives and the country's leading human rights activist.

=== 2018 ===
The 2018 summit took place on Tuesday, February 20, 2018. Speakers included Hillel Neuer, executive director of UN Watch; Luis Almagro, Uruguayan politician and Secretary General of the Organization of American States; Bolivian attorney and Human Rights Foundation associate Javier El-Hage; Turkish novelist Aslı Erdoğan; Cuban psychologist, journalist, and activist Guillermo Fariñas; Zimbabwean pastor and dissident Evan Mawarire; Effy Nguyen, son of Vietnamese activist and political prisoner Nguyen Trung Ton; Pakistani journalist Taha Siddiqui; Chinese dissident Yang Jianli; Hong Kong bookshop owner Lam Wing-kee; Tibetan monk and activist Golog Jigme; British journalist Jonny Gould; Farida Abbas Khalaf, Yazidi author of The Girl Who Beat ISIS; Ruth Dreifuss, first female president of Switzerland; Congolese human rights activist Julienne Lusenge; María-Alejandra Aristeguieta Álvarez, coordinator of Iniciativa Por Venezuela; Canadian former MP Irwin Cotler; Venezuelan politician and former political prisoner Antonio Ledezma; Luis Almagro, Secretary General of the Organization of American States; Ugandan LGBT rights activist Kasha Jacqueline; Iranian-Canadian activist Maryam Nayeb Yazdi; Iranian journalist and filmmaker Maziar Bahari; Maryam Malekpour, sister of Iranian political prisoner Saeed Malekpour; Fred and Cindy Warmbier, parents of the late Otto Warmbier, an American student who died after being tortured in North Korea; Korean-American missionary Kenneth Bae; Russian dissident Vladimir Vladimirovich Kara-Murza; Congolese women's rights advocate Julienne Lusenge and American attorney and diplomat Alfred H. Moses.

The 2018 Courage Award was given to Russian dissident Vladimir Vladimirovich Kara-Murza. The 2018 Women's Rights Award was given to Congolese women's rights advocate Julienne Lusenge.

=== 2019 ===
The 2019 summit took place on Tuesday, March 26, 2019. Speakers included Hillel Neuer, executive director of UN Watch; Syrian journalist Abdalaziz Alhamza; American attorney and diplomat Alfred H. Moses; Human Rights Foundation associate Centa Rek; Tibetan filmmaker and activist Dhondup Wangchen; Venezuelan diplomat Diego Arria; Saudi-Canadian activist Ensaf Haidar, wife of jailed Saudi blogger Raif Badawi; Nicaraguan opposition leader Felix Maradiaga; Moroccan politician Hakima El Haite; American journalist James Kirchick; human rights lawyer Juan Carlos Gutiérrez; exiled Burundian poet and activist Ketty Nivyabandi; Canadian MP Michael Levitt; Vietnamese human rights lawyer Nguyễn Văn Đài; Somali activist Nimco Ali; Kurdish journalist and activist Nurcan Baysal; Swedish journalist and editor Paulina Neuding; Richard Ratcliffe, husband of British-Iranian activist Nazanin Zaghari-Ratcliffe; Vicente de Lima II, brother of jailed Filipino lawyer Leila de Lima; and Chinese dissident Yang Jianli.

The 2019 Courage Award was given to Tibetan filmmaker and activist Dhondup Wangchen, who "exposed life under Chinese rule through a groundbreaking documentary, Leaving Fear Behind." The 2019 Women's Right's Award went to Somali activist Nimco Ali for her campaign to end female genital mutilation.

== Partners ==
Partners include the following organizations:

- UN Watch
- Darfur Peace and Development Center
- Directorio Democratico Cubano
- Freedom & Roam Uganda
- Human Rights Foundation
- Human Rights Activists in Iran
- Initiatives for China
- International League against Racism and Anti-Semitism
- Stop Child Executions
- World Uighur Congress
- Viet Tan
- Uyghur American Association
- Collectif Urgence Darfour
- Ingenieurs Du Monde
- Inter-African Committee on Traditional Practices Affecting the Health of Women and Children
- International Federation of Liberal Youth
- Tibetan Women's Association - Switzerland
- Justice for North Korea
- Liberal International
- Freedom Rights Project
- Iniciativa por Venezuela
