= Polina Nemirovskaia =

Russian human rights advocate

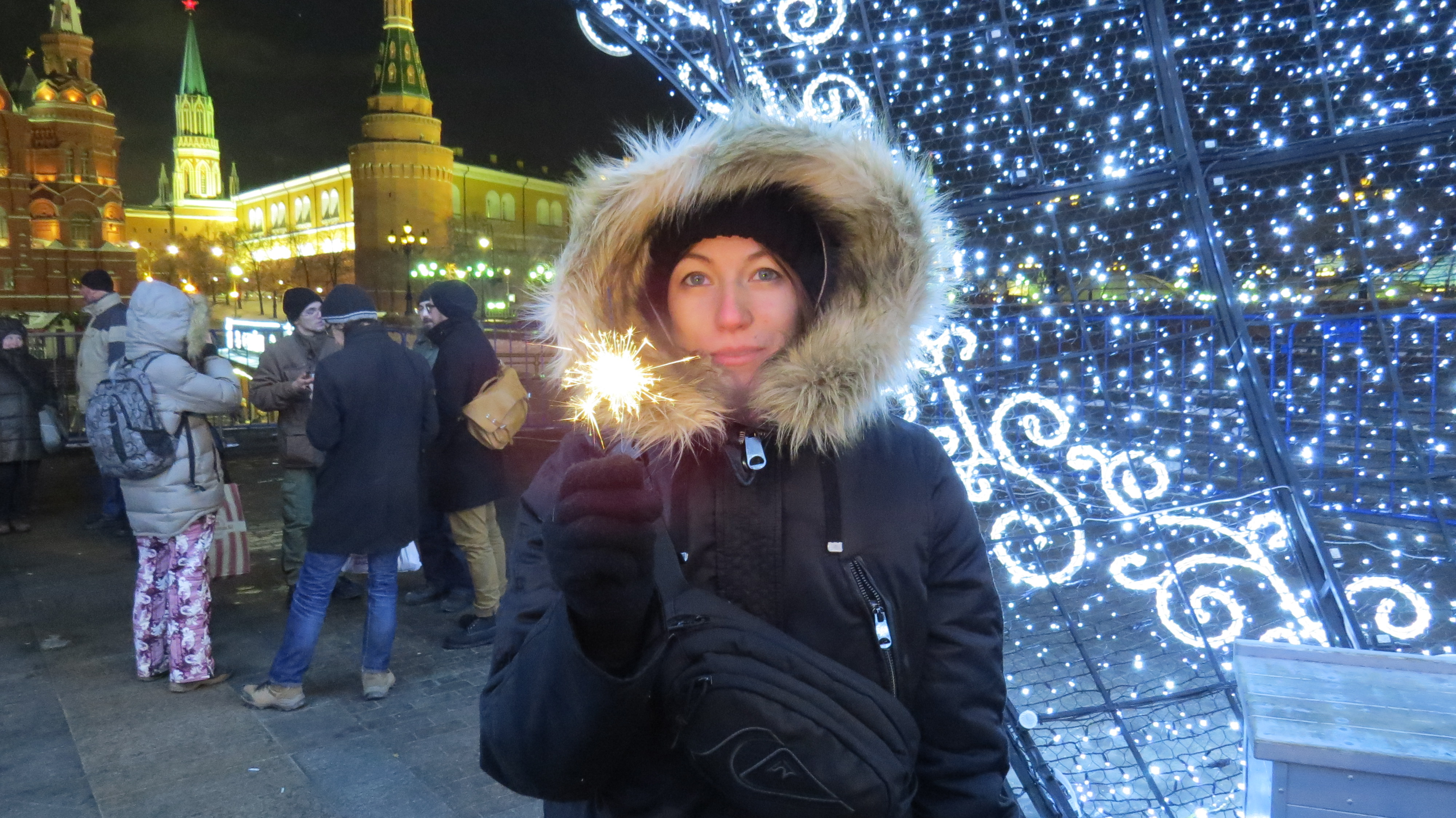
Polina Nemirovskaia in 2014

Polina Nemirovskaia (born 8 November 1995) is a Russian human rights advocate specializing in prisoners' rights. She is a coordinator for Open Russia, a pro-democracy NGO in Moscow. Open Russia was designated as "undesirable" by the Russian government in 2017 and its offices raided by the police in February 2019 for hosting a videoconference with exiled Kremlin critic Mikhail Khodorkovsky.

Nemirovskaia was raised by her politically active grandparents, and became interested in politics at a young age. She wrote her first political article when she was 13, in response to the Russia–Ukraine gas disputes. While still a teenager, she campaigned for Boris Nemtsov, an outspoken critic of Vladimir Putin. Nemtsov was assassinated in 2015. In 2016 she served as chief of staff for the opposition campaign of Maria Baronova.

Nemirovskaia has given televised interviews and spoken about Russian repression at Forum 2000, the Geneva Summit for Human Rights and Democracy, UN Watch, and other venues. She made international headlines in 2018 when she criticized the government for censoring the satirical British film The Death of Stalin.
