= Maikel Nabil Sanad =

Egyptian activist

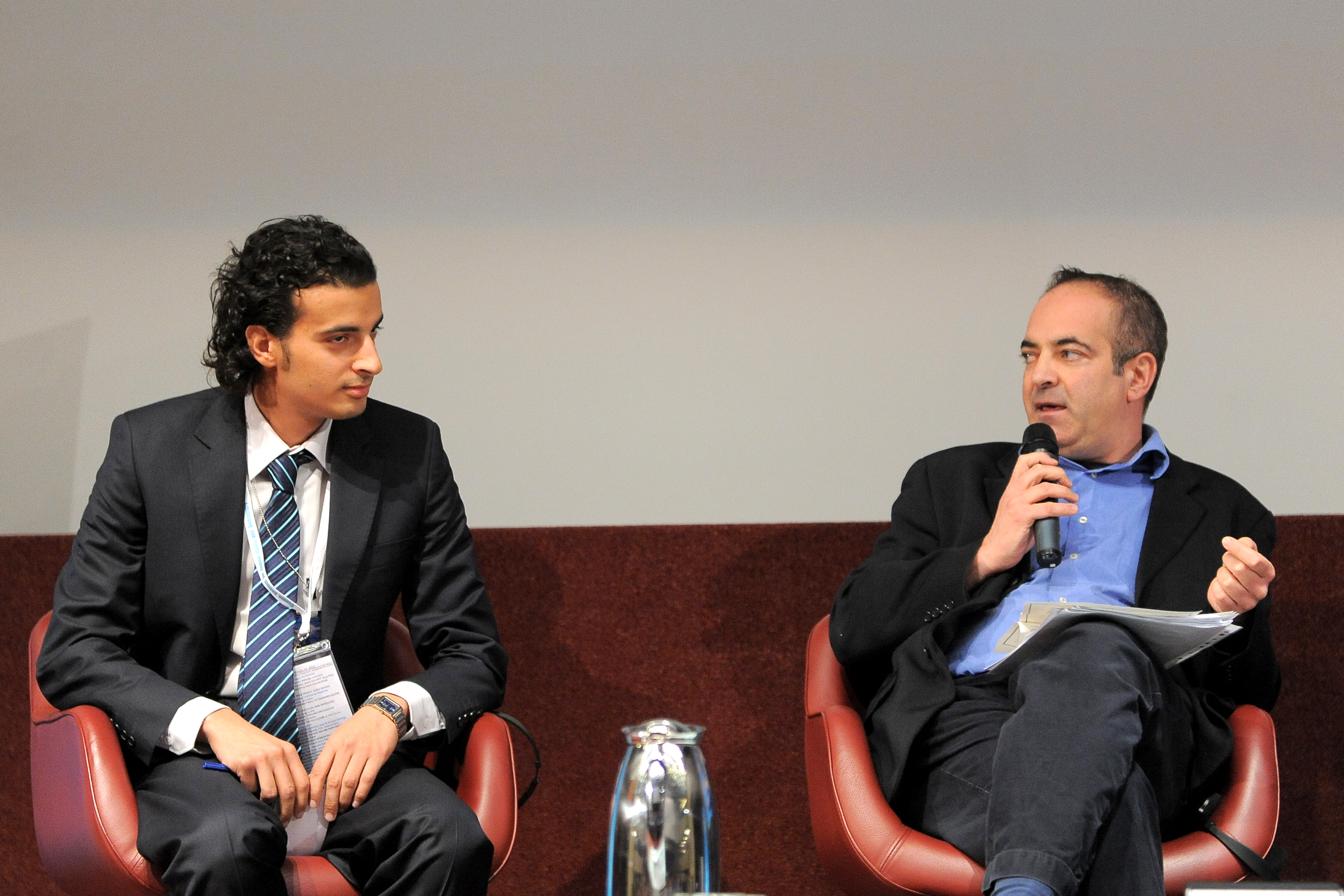
- Maikel Nabil (left) in an interview with Tom Gross at the Geneva Summit in 2012
- Born: 1 October 1985 (age 40); Asyut, Egypt
- Known for: Political activism, blogging, leader of No to Compulsory Military Service Movement

Maikel Nabil Sanad (also transcribed as Michael Arabic: مايكل نبيل سند, IPA: [ˈmɑjkel næˈbiːl ˈsænæd]; born 1 October 1985) is an Egyptian political activist, blogger, and a former political prisoner. He became famous in 2010 for refusing to serve in the Egyptian army, then in 2011 for his role in the Egyptian revolution.

Nabil is the first Egyptian blogger to be arrested solely for his opinion. He is known for promoting liberal democratic values in Egypt, and campaigning for peaceful relations between Egypt and Israel. Nabil has called himself Egypt's "only" pro-Israel activist. He currently lives in exile in the United States.

== Early life ==
Nabil was born to a Coptic Christian family in Asyut. In May 2007, Nabil wrote a blog post mentioning that he left Christianity, and that three priests had visited him at home, insulted him, and told him not to spread skepticism in religion among his community. Nabil's family never accepted his apostasy from Christianity. His father told Haaretz in Oct 2011 that "he would rather see Nabil die than to call him an atheist.". Later in October 2012, Egypt's General Prosecutor opened an investigation to decide if Nabil should be charged with Blasphemy because of his writings. Despite his atheism, he has delivered several speeches in several churches and synagogues in Germany and the United States about peace and democracy in the Middle East.

Nabil was an assistant researcher for a professor the University of California in 2008. Nabil obtained his Bachelor in Veterinary Medicine from Asyut University in 2009, then he studied law at Cairo University and Public Policy at Erfurt University. He missed his final exams at Cairo University because he was in prison.

== Political views ==
Nabil describes himself on his blog as "Liberal, Secular, Capitalist, Feminist, Pro-Western, Pro-Peace, Atheist, Materialist, Realist, Pro-Globalist, Intactivist, Anti-militarist, Pacifist". He is known for promoting free market economy as part of liberal democracy. He is part of an Egyptian campaign acting against male circumcision. He supports LGBT rights and abortion.

In 2011, Nabil emphasized that Egypt's problems were bigger than the rule of Hosni Mubarak. The problem, he believed, was the 1952 coup d'etat that brought a military government to power.

Nabil is known for promoting peaceful relations between Egypt and Israel. In his declaration of refusal of the military service in October 2010 he stated: "I'm not ready to carry an arm against an Israeli soldier, obligatorily recruited, who defends the right of his country to exist." Later in December 2010, he wrote the article "Why I'm pro-Israel", which was republished later on Al-Tawassul, the Arabic-language official website of the Israeli Foreign Ministry. when the Egyptian revolution started in 2011, Nabil broadcast a message to Israelis on his YouTube channel, calling Israelis to support the Egyptian revolution, arguing that democratic Egypt will be a friend of Israel. In April 2012 Nabil travelled to Germany to study at the Willy Brandt School of Public Policy at the University of Erfurt. In December 2012, he visited Israel and Palestine, and he wrote an article called "Let There Be Peace" and he gave public lectures at both Jerusalem and Tel Aviv Universities. He also visited the PLO in Ramallah.

Nabil said “if the Palestinians had a democratic leadership, everything would be solved." He blamed Hamas for starting wars with Israel.

== Activism ==
On 9 April 2009 Nabil founded the No to Compulsory Military Service movement (NoMilService). In October 2010, he declared his conscientious objection, and he wrote a blog post about that, demanding to be exempted from military service. Instead, he was arrested on 12 November 2010 by military police but was released the next day, and finally exempted from service on medical grounds.

Nabil, with his movement, supports other conscientious objectors to the military service like Emad Dafrawi and Mohamed Fathi. NoMiService movement also protested in April 2013 for the freedom of the Israeli Conscientious Objector Natan Blanc.

== Incarceration ==
Nabil was detained several times in Egypt because of his political views and activities. He was arrested on 4 February 2011 by military police and was tortured, but released 27 hours later.

In March 2011, he was arrested again from his home in the Ain Shams neighborhood in Cairo by the military intelligence. He was only able to call his brother the next day to inform him of his arrest. Nabil was sentenced to three years imprisonment on charges of "insulting the military" in his post "The Army and The People Were Never One Hand" by the 10th of Ramadan military court in Nasr City near Cairo on 10 April. Before this, he was imprisoned in a special punishment cell at El Marg prison, which did not allow him any sunlight. In addition, he was placed with common criminal cellmates who threatened him. He also was denied access to decent food and was forced to shower in dirty water and sleep on insect-laden bedding. He suffered severe allergies on all parts of his body due to the insect-laden bedding. Nabil demanded a doctor, as he has unstable blood pressure and a heart condition and needs regular medication and medical attention. He began a hunger strike August 23, 2011. During his hunger strike he suffered two comas and was close to death on numerous occasions.

On 14 December 2011 the Egyptian supreme military court of appeals reduced his sentence to a two-year jail sentence, despite appeals to be freed. A call for a demonstration protesting against Maikel Nabil's imprisonment was announced through social media to take place on 29 December at the Tahrir Square.

Nabil was pardoned by the military ruling council on 23 January 2012. He spoke of his experiences at the Geneva Summit for Human Rights and Democracy a few weeks later.

== Awards and nominations ==
"Human rights activist" David Keyes described Nabil as "utterly fearless: a staunch liberal in a deeply conservative society and a fierce critic of the military, an institution not known for its openness to alternative views."

Nabil has been nominated for the Nobel Peace Prize and for the Reporters Without Borders Netizen Prize. He received the First Freedom Award in 2011 from The International Federation of Liberal Youth (IFLRY), was chosen as the Honorary Writer of year 2012 by Mideast Youth, and was chosen among top Egyptian bloggers by The Daily Beast in January 2013.
