= Jean-Claude Buhrer =

Swiss journalist

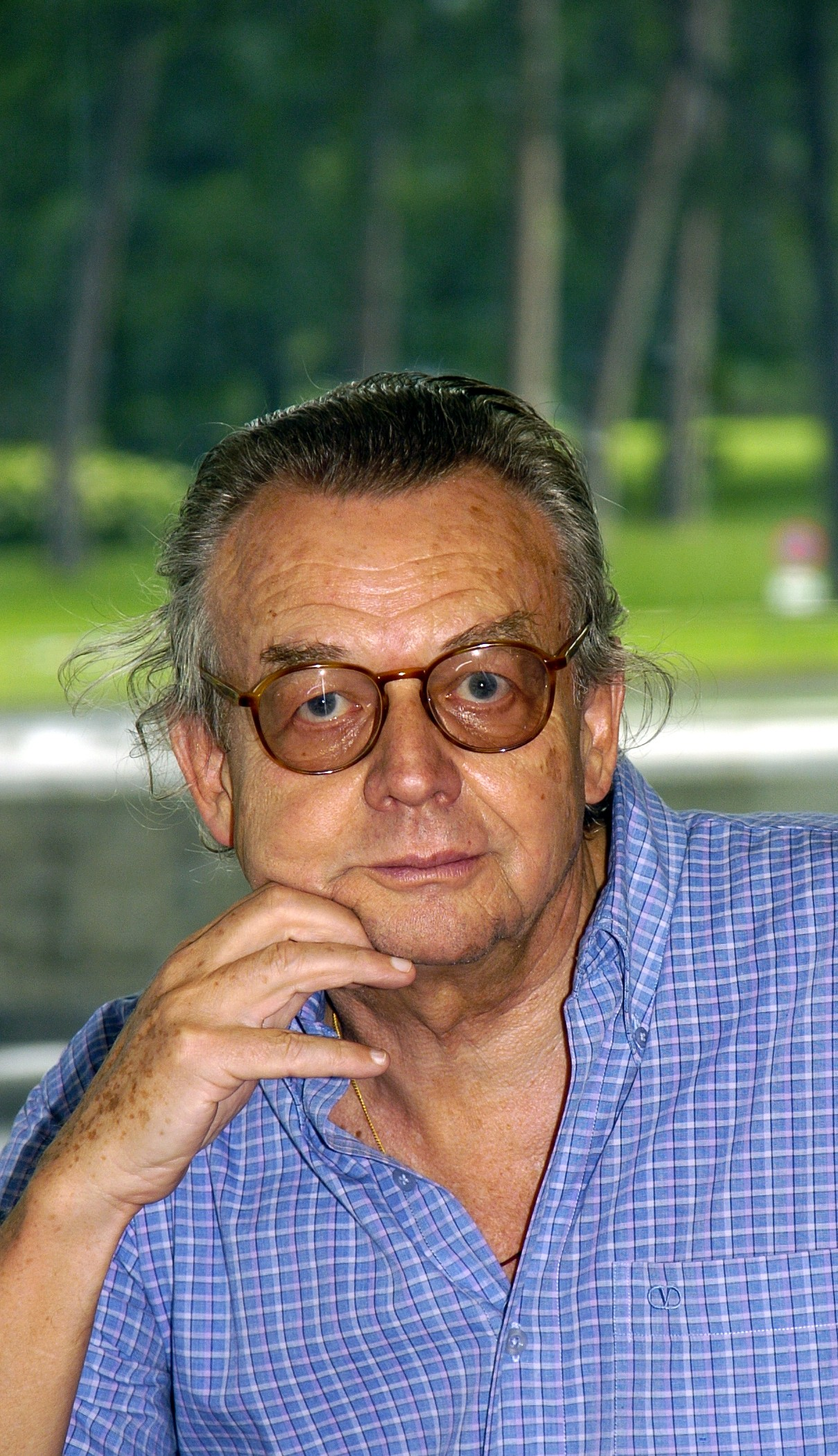

Jean-Claude Buhrer is a Swiss journalist and author. He reported for Le Monde. He has been on the UN Watch board. He has written about Asia and Latin America. A Mother Jones article referred to Buhrer as the "world's leading" watcher of Swiss Nazi supporter François Genoud.

French journalist and orientalist Claude B. Levenson (died 2010) was his wife and co-author.

Buhrer received "La Pluma de Plata Mexicana" in 1993 for his articles on Mexico in the newspaper Le Monde.

In 2007 he was interviewed about protests in Burma. In 2009, he was interviewed about political violence in Thailand.

He has been critical of the UN Commission on Human Rights. He wrote about Mexican journalist Manuel Buendia who was assassinated. Buhrer was banned from China because of his articles about Tibet.

== Writings ==
- Allende un itinéraire sans détours, 1974, L'Âge d'homme.
- Le Guatemala et ses populations, avec Claude B. Levenson, 1980, Complexe, ISBN 2870270453
- D'Asie et d'ailleurs, avec Claude B. Levenson, Éditions Balland, 1991, ISBN 2715808941
- Aung San Suu Kyi, demain la Birmanie, avec Claude B. Levenson, Ed. Philippe Picquier, 2003, ISBN 2877303748
- Sérgio Vieira de Mello - Un espoir foudroyé, avec Claude B. Levenson, Éditions Mille et Une Nuits, 2004, ISBN 2842058267
- L'ONU Contre Les Droits De L'homme, avec Claude B. Levenson, Éditions Mille et Une Nuits, 2003, ISBN 2842057511
- Birmanie : des moines contre la dictature, avec Claude B. Levenson, Éditeur : Mille et Une Nuits, 2008, ISBN 9782755500554
- Tibet, Tibétains, Un peuple, un regard, avec Claude B. Levenson, Glénat, 2010, ISBN 2723475093

Articles

- L'ONU captive de la Chine à propos du Tibet, ProChoix
- Un bilan mitigé du Conseil des droits de l'homme, 7 juillet 2006, Reporters sans frontières
- RSF juge le bilan du Conseil des droits de l'homme plus que mitigé, 7 juillet 2006, Reporters sans frontières
- Aung San Suu Kyi, une Lady au pouvoir, Le Temps, 21 avril 2016
- UN COMMISSION ON HUMAN RIGHTS LOSES ALL CREDIBILITY, juillet 2003, Reporters sans frontières
- Human Rights on the rocks at the UN, 22 avril 2004, Reporters sans frontières
- Another sign of failure for Human Rights Council in resolution on Lebanon, 12 août 2006
