= Maryam Nayeb Yazdi =

Canadian activist

- Born: 1983 (age 42–43); Mashhad, Iran
- Other name: Mai Love

Maryam Nayeb Yazdi (also known as Mai Love) (Persian: مریم نایب یزدی) is an Iranian-Canadian writer, editor, and consultant working in the field of human rights and online activism for social change. She is active in communicating news about human-rights infractions in Iran to Western audiences. She is also the founder of Seed Operations, a 501(C)(3) nonprofit organization.

== Early life ==
Nayeb Yazdi was born in Mashhad, Iran, in 1983, but in 1989 she and her family filed for asylum in Canada and received refugee status. She grew up in Toronto and moved to the United States in 2019 to pursue nonprofit work. She is currently residing in Washington, DC.

== Career ==
While writing a piece on violence against women in Iran as part of her women's studies course at York University, she noticed that information about Iran is scarce in the English language. She created Faryad, an English-language cultural magazine meant to bridge the gap between Iranians in Iran and the Diaspora. In 2008, while she was working on Faryad, she created the inaugural edition of a publication created for the Tirgan Festival. But when the protest movement erupted in Iran in 2009, she shifted her focus to human rights and became one of the pioneers of online activism. She created Persian2English., an acclaimed translation blog that ran from 2009 to 2016.

The Islamic Republic authorities had banned all international media and arrested many journalists and reporters. The human rights activists present in the country were exposing the situation in Persian language, making the international community more reliant on translations to know about the situation in Iran. Persian2English gathered the attention of international media, including Maclean's Magazine, The Atlantic, The Guardian, Amnesty International, LA Times, Al Jazeera, PBS, CNN, and also attracted Columbia University, Santa Clara University, Brigham Young University, and the Australian Government.

Nayeb Yazdi has been a part of various panels, forums, conferences, and consulted by influencers, including media and politicians.

In 2012 and again in 2016, she teamed up with Senator Linda Frum as a consultant and writer to shed light on the plight of prisoners of conscience in Iran. In 2013, she was a featured speaker at the annual Oslo Freedom Forum (OFF). She discussed how the Iranian authorities use the death penalty to suppress civil society. In 2018, she delivered a speech at the Geneva Summit on the human rights situation in Iran.

Nayeb Yazdi has written for various publications, including Foreign Policy, Wall Street Journal, Huffington Post, Atlantic Council, and the Nobel Peace Center. And has been cited in multiple outlets, including Reuters, Toronto Star, National Post, The Guardian, and the Danish government.

In 2017, she created Oslo Women's Rights Initiative in collaboration with the Nobel Peace Center and Civita. The initiative featured frontline women's rights leaders from countries with extreme gender inequality.

=== Saeed Malekpour case ===
Nayeb Yazdi is the co-founder and spokesperson for the global campaign to free Canadian Permanent Resident Saeed Malekpour, who, while visiting his sick father in Iran in 2008, was abducted by the Iranian authorities and tortured until he provided them with false confessions that led to the Iranian Judiciary to issue him a sentence for the charge of sowing corruption on earth. The Iranian authorities accused Malekpour of moderating pornographic websites and forced him to confess to this act, which the Iranian authorities consider a crime punishable by death. To this day, the only evidence that the Iranian authorities have against Malekpour are his forced confessions. In 2010, after the Iranian authorities aired Malekpour's forced confessions on national television before his trial and sentencing, Malekpour wrote a letter from prison defending himself that his confessions were extracted under torture. Nayeb Yazdi and her team translated his letter into English and published it on Persian2English, which garnered the attention of media, governments, and human rights organizations. That same year, the Iranian judge Moghiseh, sentenced Saeed Malekpour to death based on the forced confessions. It was then that Nayeb Yazdi launched a global campaign to gain support for Malekpour.

Nayeb Yazdi's efforts led to Iran's Supreme Court to halt Malekpour's execution sentence in 2011 pending a new trial that would investigate the allegations in Malekpour's letter that his confessions were extracted under torture. However, that same year, the new trial was held, presided by Judge Moghiseh again, and Malekpour was sentenced to death for the second time without investigations conducted into his claims that his confessions were extracted under torture. This time, under pressure from the Islamic Revolutionary Guard Corps (IRGC), Iran's Supreme Court confirmed the death sentence, which put Malekpour in imminent danger of execution. Nayeb Yazdi's efforts led to the Parliament of Canada to pass a unanimous motion in support of Malekpour calling on the Iranian authorities to release him.

The international attention that Malekpour's case received led Iran's Supreme Leader, Ali Khamenei, to eventually commute his death sentence to life in prison. In July 2019, the Iranian authorities granted Malekpour a short furlough, and with the help of Nayeb Yazdi, he managed to flee Iran and make it back to Canada safely.

== Honors and awards ==
In 2013, the Governor General of Canada awarded the Queen Elizabeth II Diamond Jubilee Medal to Yazdi in recognition of her human-rights achievements.
