= Hadeel Kouki =

Syrian human rights activist

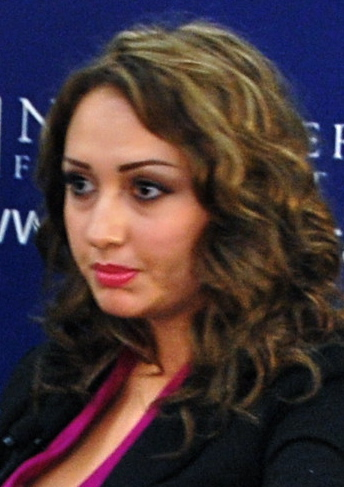
Hadeel Kouki, in 2012

Hadeel Kouki (born circa 1992) is a former human rights activist from Syria.

In early March 2011, while a 19-year-old student at the University of Aleppo, Kouki claims she was detained by Bashar al-Assad's government for 40 days and held in solitary confinement for distributing pro-revolution flyers. She had no access to legal counsel and was allowed no visitors. Over the next few months she was arrested and detained twice more for attending demonstrations. In December 2011, when military intelligence agents summoned her, intending to arrest her for providing medical aid to protesters, she fled the country. At first she hid in the desert, later making her way to Turkey with the help of the Free Syrian Army. From there, she traveled to France and Sweden, and later to Egypt, working to help the Syrian opposition. Her family has since migrated to Europe, some of them smuggling themselves there by boat.

On February 23, 2012, she claims Syrian secret police broke into her apartment in Cairo, Egypt, threatened her life, and severely beat her.

Kouki has addressed the United Nations Human Rights Council, the Geneva Summit for Human Rights and Democracy, the New America Foundation, the United States Institute of Peace, and other groups.

Referring to the Assad regime during a speech in Lebanon, she said, "This regime under no terms could be considered as a protector of minority rights or of Christians." She has criticized the administration of President Barack Obama for not doing more to help Middle Eastern minorities such as Syrian Christians, secular Syrians, and Kurds. She has also criticized Christian religious leaders for failing to speak out: "None of the Christian figures or leaders asked for us when we were being tortured or beaten in prisons."

She has since been offered political asylum in a Western country.

== See also ==
- Oula A. Alrifai
