= Morris B. Abram =

American civil rights lawyer

Morris Berthold Abram
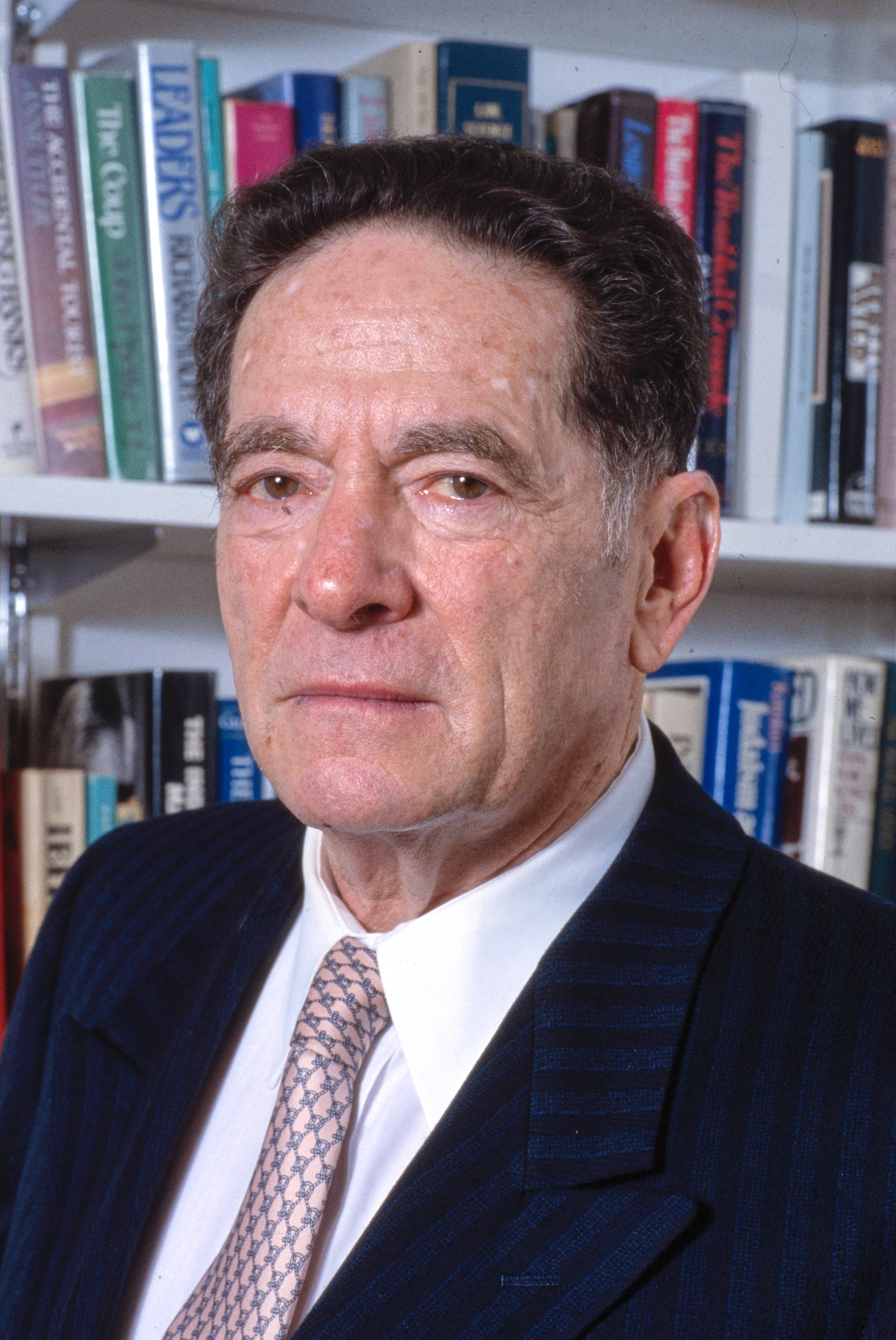
- Abram in 1988
- Born: June 19, 1918; Fitzgerald, Georgia, US
- Died: March 16, 2000 (aged 81); Geneva, Switzerland
- Occupations: Lawyer, civil rights activist, United Nations Representative, University President
- Known for: Civil rights efforts; presidency of Brandeis University; work as representative to European Office of the United Nations; chairing philanthropic, political, and arts organizations
- Notable work: The Day is Short
- Spouses: Jane Isabella Maguire (m. 1944–1974) Carlyn Fisher (m. 1975–1987) Bruna Molina (m. 1990)

Morris Berthold Abram (June 19, 1918 – March 16, 2000) was an American lawyer, civil rights activist, and for two years president of Brandeis University. In 1953 he successfully sought the Democratic nomination for Congress from the Fifth District in Georgia, urging the desegregation of schools, but lost the election in 1954.

Abram is best remembered as a civil rights attorney who successfully waged a fourteen-year struggle, from 1949 to 1963, to end a Georgia electoral rule that effectively gave disproportionate weight in primary elections to whites at the expense of blacks. He briefed Attorney General Robert Kennedy, who successfully argued against the rule before the U.S. Supreme Court; it was struck down in 1963, with the court finding that "within a given constituency there can be room for but one constitutional rule – one voter, one vote."

== Biography ==
=== Early life and career ===
Abram was born into a Jewish family, the son of Sam Abram, a Romanian immigrant who came to America in 1904. His mother, Irene Cohen, was born into a German Jewish family that first settled in Philadelphia in 1848. He grew up in the small town of Fitzgerald, Georgia and attended the University of Georgia, where he excelled academically. At UGA, he was a member of the Phi Kappa Literary Society and graduated according to one source with the highest grade-point average in the school's history. Abram then earned a J.D. degree from the University of Chicago Law School. Although he was forced to delay a Rhodes scholarship because of the Second World War, he later earned a master's degree from Oxford University.

==== Wartime service ====
After graduation from the University of Chicago Law School, Abram served as an Army Air Corps Public Relations Officer in the Second World War.

==== Work at the Nuremberg trials and drafting the Fourth Geneva Convention ====
While at Oxford, a professor arranged for Abram to join the staff of prosecutors at the International Military Tribunal at Nuremberg. Around 1949, he was involved in the drafting of the Fourth Geneva Convention, a document which dealt primarily with humanitarian protections for civilians in a war zone.

He later received criticism primarily from Palestinian representatives for a statement he made during that period that did not focus on the plight of displaced Palestinians and the existence of Israeli settlements in what they deemed occupied territories during the first year of Israel's statehood.

==== Work for Jewish causes and legal work on behalf of nursing homes ====
Abram was deeply affected by the Holocaust and later became an ardent supporter of Jewish causes.

Before moving to New York, and while working in Georgia during his civil rights career, he negotiated the release of Dr. Martin Luther King from a Fulton County Georgia jail.

In 1975, Abram led a Moreland Act Commission established to investigate corruption in New York's nursing home industry. The commission's recommendations led to several changes, among them the closing of 68 nursing homes that failed to comply with existing fire-safety codes.

He was national president of the American Jewish Committee from 1963 to 1968; chairman of the National Conference on Soviet Jewry from 1983 to 1988; and chairman of the Conference of Presidents of Major American Jewish Organizations from 1986 to 1989.

== High level positions held ==
Throughout his long legal career, Abram held a variety of high level positions. In 1961 he was appointed by President Kennedy to chief counsel of the Peace Corps. He also worked as a partner at the New York law firm Paul, Weiss, Rifkind, Wharton & Garrison from 1963 to 1968. He then worked as President of Brandeis University from 1968 to 1970. In 1969, he was elected a Fellow of the American Academy of Arts and Sciences. He served as chairman of the President Carter's Commission on the Study of Ethical Problems in Medicine and Biomedical and Behavioral Research. In New York, he chaired the Governor's Commission on Nursing Home Practices.

In 1983, he was nominated to the United States Commission on Civil Rights by Ronald Reagan. By that time, he was a vocal opponent of affirmative action and busing which made him a fit for Reagan, but an instant opponent of many more liberal civil rights advocates.

From 1970 to 1979 he served as Chairman of the United Negro College Fund, an organization which raises money predominantly for Black colleges and universities.

=== Representative to the UN European Office, 1989–93 ===
President George H. W. Bush appointed Abram as the representative of the United States to the European Office of the United Nations and he served in that office from 1989 to 1993. In 1990, he served as the U.S. representative to the UN Commission on Human Rights. He took criticism primarily for siding with America's solitary veto of the 1986 UN Resolution to the Right to development of countries, when he stated that the right to development was an "empty vessel" and would be "a dangerous incitement". America's veto of the resolution may have been related to the nature of their economic, political, and military involvement with developing countries particularly in Africa and the Middle East during the Reagan and George H. Bush administrations.

=== Founder of UN Watch, 1993 ===
Abram founded UN Watch in 1993 while serving as Honorary President of the American Jewish Committee; he was inspired in large part by what he considered to be consistent anti-Israel bias at the UN. UN Watch has been active in combating human rights abuses in Democratic Republic of the Congo and Darfur, and has been vocal against abuses in regimes such as China, Venezuela, Cuba and Russia. The group was praised by former UN Secretary General Kofi Annan, and the Director General of the UN Office in Geneva Sergei Ordzhonikidze noted "the valuable work of UN Watch in support of the just application of values and principles of the United Nations Charter and support for human rights for all."

While working for UN Watch, Abram noted in 1996 that Israel was the only country in the UN excluded from membership in a geopolitical grouping or states groups which made it ineligible to serve on the Security Council, the Human Rights commission, and a large number of other bodies. These exclusions, Abrams believed "made it easier for Israel's enemies to proactively cultivate international hostility toward Israel at the General Assembly". Abram pushed for Israel's membership in the Western European or other states groups as the "only reasonable way to remedy this ongoing illegal discrimination against Israel". Abram was concerned during this period there were 19 United Nations resolutions that castigated Israel.

== Later life and surviving illness ==
Abram was diagnosed with leukemia in 1973, which was initially thought to be terminal. However, he overcame the disease, and published a memoir in 1982, The Day is Short. Nevertheless, into the late 70s he continued to endure painful chemotherapy, a variety of anti-leukemia drugs, and injections of treated leukemic cells. He survived the illness for nearly three decades, until dying of a viral infection March 15, 2000 in Geneva at the age of 81.

== Personal life ==
Abram had three marriages; his first wife, Jane, from 1944 to 1974, with whom he had five children, Ruth, Annie, Morris, Adam, and Joshua, and nine grandchildren. He was married from 1975 to 1987 to Carlyn Fisher, and for his remaining life to Bruna Molina.
