= Claude B. Levenson =

French journalist (1938–2010)

- Born: 2 August 1938; Paris, France
- Died: 13 December 2010 (aged 72); Lausanne, Switzerland
- Occupations: Journalist; Orientalist; Translator; Tibetologist; Writer
- Spouse: Jean-Claude Buhrer

Claude B. Levenson (2 August 1938 – 13 December 2010) was a French journalist, orientalist, Tibetologist, translator and writer who authored approximately twenty-five books on the subjects of Buddhism, Burma and Tibet. She contributed to the newspapers Le Monde, L'Obs, Politique internationale, Le Temps, Geo, 24 heures and Libération. Levenson was a member of the Committee of 100 for Tibet and worked as a translator for the Dalai Lama.

== Early life ==
Levenson was born in Paris on 2 August 1938. She was the daughter of a Jew from Bessarabia who would become a resistance fighter during the Second World War when France was under occupation but who was murdered by the Nazis at Auschwitz in 1941. Levenson's mother would also become a resistance fighter. Levenson attended the public school Lycée et collège Victor-Duruy in Paris, and in the 1950s, she studied Russian, Sanskrit and several Oriental languages, such as Hindi and Persian at Moscow State University while she became acquainted with Oriental civizilations.

== Career ==
Levenson worked for the newspapers Le Monde, L'Obs, Politique internationale, Le Temps, Geo, 24 heures, political commentary for Libération and the broadcaster Radio Suisse Internationale. She was a member of the Committee of 100 for Tibet.

While at university, Levenson began to sympathise with the cause of Tibet. She first met the Tibetan religious leader Dalai Lama in Paris in 1981 and she maintained a friendship with him over the following decades, working as an interpreter for him. Levenson had also previously met dictators in South America while living in the region and observed events of 1980s Argentina. She ventured to Tibet for the first time in 1984 after a meeting with the Dalai Lama the previous year in Geneva and she remained there until her visa was terminated by Beijing in 2005. Levenson was declared persona non grata in China in 2006 due to her perceived closeness with Tibetan separatists. She also met the Burmese Aung San Suu Kyi several times.

She authored approximately twenty-five books on Buddhism (two), Burma (two) and Tibet (fifteen). Some of the books were co-authored with her husband Jean-Claude Buhrer, the journalist, as well as Gianni Baldizzone, Tiziana Baldizzone and Laziz Hamani. These include Le chemin de Lhassa, un voyage au Tibet (1985), Le Seigneur du Lotus blanc, le Dalaï Lama (1987), D’Asie et d’ailleurs (1991), Ainsi parle le Dalaï Lama (1991), L’An prochain à Lhassa (1993), L’An prochain à Lhassa (1995), 1949–1959, la Chine envahit le Tibet (1995), aïlash, Joyau des neiges: Carnet de voyage au Tibet (1996), Symboles du bouddhisme tibétain (1996), La messagère du Tibet (1997), La Messagères du Tibet (1998), Le Dalaï Lama, naissance d’un destin (1998), Dormir, rêver, mourir : explorer la conscience avec le Dalaï-Lama (1998), Le Dalaï-Lama (1999), Tibet, un peuple en sursis (2000), Aung San Suu Kyi, demain la Birmanie (2000), Tibet, otage de la Chine (2002), L’ONU contre les droits de l’homme (2003), Le Bouddhisme (2004–2010), Vieira de Mello: L’Espoir foudroyé (2004), Tibet, d’oubli et de mémoire (2007), Birmanie: des moines contre la dictature (2008), Le Tibet (2008), Tibet, La question qui dérange (2008) and Tibet, Tibétains, Un peuple, un regard (2010). Her works have been translated into about twenty languages and she also translated the works of Octavio Paz and Osip Mandelstam.

== Death ==
On the morning of 13 December 2010, Levenson died of cancer in Lausanne, Switzerland.

== Legacy ==
A tribute to Levenson featuring film, slide shows and testimonies took place in Geneva in March 2011. In May 2011, the Théâtre du Soleil hosted a tribute evening to Levenson with the show Je suis le cœur d’un peuple, which was a presentation of readings of poems in Chinese, French and Tibetan. The Swiss Film Archive has kept a collection of Levenson's papers in their archive since 2014, and the Cantonal and University Library of Lausanne holds a collection on her since it acquired them in 2016.
