= Yisrael Medad =

American-born Israeli journalist (born 1947)

- ישראל מידד
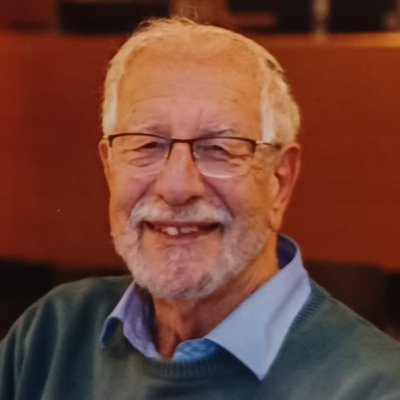
- Born: New York City

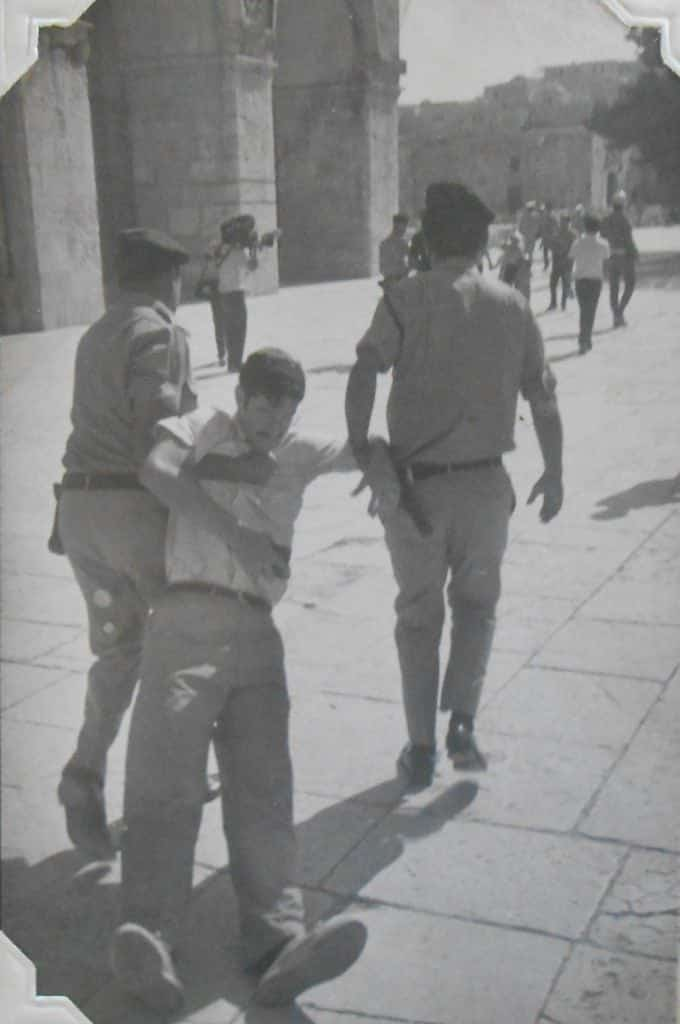
Medad being dragged by police from the Temple Mount plaza

Yisrael Medad (Hebrew: ישראל מידד; born 1947 in New York City) is an American-born Israeli journalist and author. He was director of Educational Programming and Information resources at the Menachem Begin Heritage Center in Jerusalem until June 2017 and has retired from that position. He is now engaged in editing an English-language annotated anthology of Ze'ev Jabotinsky's writings.

== Early life, education and career ==
Medad was born to a Jewish family in New York City. As a teenager, he became religious, and attended a religious high school. Medad joined the Betar Zionist youth movement, founded by the Revisionist Zionist leader, Ze'ev Jabotinsky, in 1964. He graduated from Yeshiva University with a BA in Political Science in 1969. In 1970, he and his wife immigrated to Israel. Initially, he lived in the Jewish Quarter of Jerusalem, where he served as Director of the Betar Students' Hostel. Between 1975 and 1977, he served as a Betar representative in the United Kingdom.

In 1981, Medad and his family moved to the Israeli settlement of Shilo. From 1981 to 1992, he served as a parliamentary aide to Knesset member Geula Cohen, and as an Adviser of International Affairs to cabinet minister Yuval Ne'eman.

In 2008, he completed a Master's degree at the Hebrew University of Jerusalem, specializing in Civic and Democracy Education.

Medad is a member of the Executive Board of Israel's Media Watch.

Medad has served as Senior Assistant to the Deputy Minister for Science and as a Legislative Aide to Knesset members. He is a well-known blogger and had contributed columns to the Los Angeles Times, Jerusalem Post, International Herald Tribune and other periodicals. He has been interviewed and profiled in the BBC and Haaretz. Medad was described as one of the "PR whizzes and spokesmen for the settler movement on the international stage".

Medad is co-editor of a collection of the Begin-Sadat correspondence that led up to the 1979 Israel-Egypt peace treaty.

== Personal life ==
Medad and his wife have five children.
