= Rolando Rodríguez Lobaina =

Cuban democracy activist

Rolando Rodriguez Lobaina (was born 3 May 1969, in Baracoa, Guantánamo), is a Cuban democracy activist and Journalist.

Lobainais director of the Alternative Studies Center of the Cuban Youth for Democracy Movement, founded by his brother Néstor Rodríguez Lobaina. Lobaina is also head of the Palenque Vision, an independent journalist agency in Oriente Province, Cuba.

== Biography ==
A computer engineer graduate from the CUJAE University in Havana, Lobaina joined the opposition movement in Cuba in 1996 as part of the Youth for Democracy group. Since then, he joined and founded different dissident movements .

Lobaina spent six years in a Cuban prison. He has been arrested many times but released under international pressure. May 1, 2009, he was arrested again.

Today, Lobaino is the Director of Eastern Democratic Alliance and the Alternative Studies Center of the Cuban Youth for Democracy Movement, founded by r Nestor Rodriquez Lobaina . Rolando Rodriguez Lobaina believes that the best way to empower Cubans is to grant them access to free and reliable information, lead him to launch journals, magazines and finally one of the first audiovisual independent press agencies on the island; Palenque Visión.

Lobaina's work with Palenque Visión earned him a David Burke Distinguished Journalism Award, awarded by the US Agency for Global Media.
