= Fang Zheng =

Chinese activist

- 方政
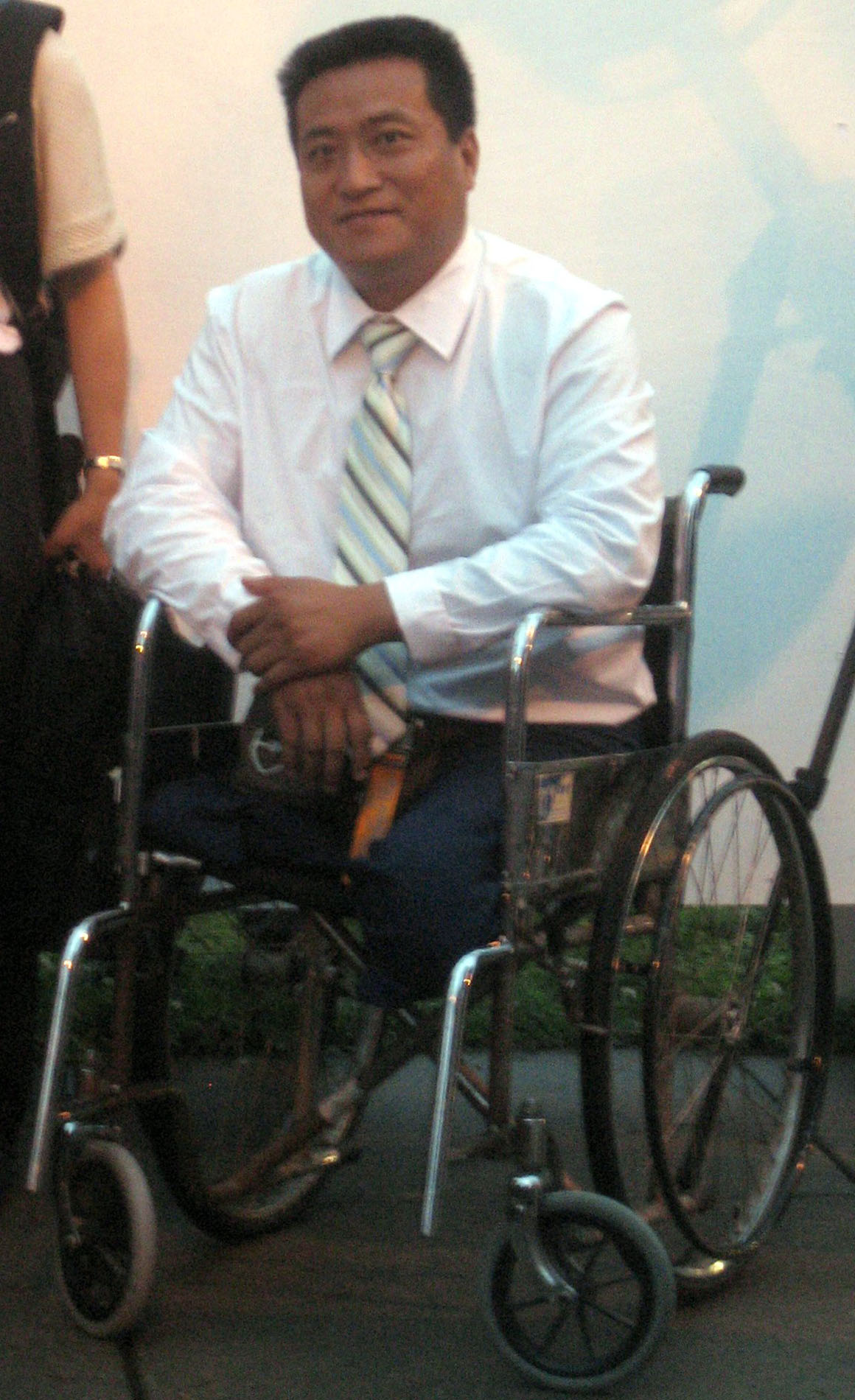
- Zheng in Washington, D.C. in 2009
- Born: October 14, 1966 (age 59); Hefei, Anhui, China

Chinese name
- Chinese: 方政
Transcriptions
Standard Mandarin
- Hanyu Pinyin: Fāng Zhèng
- Gwoyeu Romatzyh: Fang Jenq
- Wade–Giles: Fang^{1} Cheng^{4}

Fang Zheng (born October 14, 1966) is a former student protester who was seriously injured during the 1989 Tiananmen Square protests and massacre. During the evacuation of the Square in the early morning of June 4, Fang was run over by a People’s Liberation Army tank, which led to the amputation of both his legs. He is currently the president of Chinese Democracy Education Foundation.

== Early life and education ==
Fang was born in Hefei City, Anhui. From early childhood, he was a sports enthusiast and was inspired by China’s return to the Olympic Games in 1984 to enroll at Beijing Sport University.

== Involvement during the June Fourth Crackdown ==
Fang had been in Tiananmen Square on the night of June 3 and early hours of June 4 and participated in a sit-in with fellow students at the Monument to the People's Heroes. As the students reached Chang’an Avenue at Liubukou, they were bombarded with gas that caused a female student to faint from shock beside Fang. Fang picked up the female student and pushed her to safety over a guardrail along the sidewalk. While Fang was aiding the female student, he saw in the corner of his eye a tank approaching. He was unable to save himself in time as the tank ran over both of Fang’s legs and dragged him for a short distance. At that moment, Fang lost consciousness and was brought to Beijing Jishuitan Hospital, where he underwent a double amputation. Fang’s right leg was amputated at the thigh, and his left leg below the knee.

According to Fang, while in hospital, he was being investigated by the Public Security Bureau in an attempt to conceal the fact that students were attacked as they were leaving the square. For instance, at the hospital the Public Security officers prevented Fang from speaking out about the incident. Upon Fang’s return to school, he continued to face scrutiny and investigation by school officials attempting to suppress the incident by accusing Fang of being violent and having provoked the attack.

During the school’s investigation into the facts leading up to Fang’s incident, he asked the female student to testify on his behalf but she refused by stating that she could no longer remember what had happened and would later claim that she was not with him at the time of the incident.

== Post-Tiananmen Square Protests of 1989 ==
After the Tiananmen Square protests of 1989, Fang was pressured by the Chinese government to admit that his injuries were from a road accident. Fang refused, which resulted in Beijing Sport University’s withholding of Fang’s university degree and denying him a work assignment. Fang’s involvement in the protests also led to legal complications that prevented him from registering his household and his marriage. Also, Fang withdrew his membership from the Chinese Communist Party.

=== Sport competition ===
Fang, undeterred by his disability and political persecution, continued to pursue his passion of sport. In 1992 Fang represented Beijing at the third All-China Disabled Athletic Games in Guangzhou during which he won two gold medals and broke two records for the Far East and South Pacific region.

In 1994, as China’s national champion discus thrower among disabled athletes, Fang was barred from representing China at the Far East and South Pacific Games for the Disabled in Beijing. Fang did not compete and was sent home before the competition after Communist Party officials discovered that his disability had resulted from the military crackdown of the Tiananmen Square protests of 1989. In response to his barring, Fang stated that “Even though I was injured on June 4, I should be treated the same as any other disabled man, but, in reality, the situation has proved to be different” and that “there should be no connection between my injury and the cause of my injury.” During training in the lead up to the Games, Fang was told by Communist Party officials overseeing the Games to avoid foreign journalists and to avoid answering any questions about the cause of his injury during news conferences in the event that he won a medal. Although Fang had agreed to the terms, he was later barred from competing. The official explanation for barring Fang from the Games was that the discus event was to be cancelled due to a lack of entrants from other countries. The event was later won by the only entrant, Martin Peter of New Zealand.

In a Sky News interview during the lead-up to the 2008 Beijing Olympic Games, Fang was prevented from retelling his account of the tank incident by government minders explaining that it was “something related to some sensitive issue on the history of China” and that “it would be great if we can skip this.”

=== Immigration to the United States and Standing-Up Celebration ===
In August 2008 before the 2008 Beijing Olympic Games, Fang was issued a passport by the Chinese government. Fang, his wife Zhu Jin, and daughter Grace arrived in the United States in February 2009.

By 2009, Fang had been using a wheelchair for twenty years. A few months after his arrival in the United States and with the help of specialists such as Dr. Terrance Sheehan and the donation of prosthetic legs by Medical Center Orthotics and Prosthetics, Fang was able to walk again.

In 2009, an event was held in Washington, DC to celebrate Fang Zheng’s standing-up. The event was attended by Fang and his family, members of congress, media, and fellow Chinese dissidents including Yang Jianli, Feng Congde and Chai Ling. Chai Ling, a student leader of the Tiananmen Square protests of 1989, described her experience at the celebration, “When the music went up and Fang started to dance with his wife, tears came to my eyes. I pictured a day when all the survivors of Tiananmen could stand up like Fang Zheng with their loved ones to celebrate life, love, and triumph over adversity.” Yang Jianli, who was also a student leader, described Fang’s story, “In the past 20 years, in his spirit, Fang Zheng has been standing — even without legs… but today he is standing up. It is my sincere hope that we Chinese people will stand up with Fang Zheng." After Fang’s dance with his wife, Fang stated that “This is a feeling of new hope for me” and “at the same time, it’s also a feeling of new hope for China.”

=== Activism ===
On the twentieth anniversary of the June Fourth crackdown, Fang testified in front of the Tom Lantos Human Rights Commission of the United States Congress about the Tiananmen Square protests of 1989 and his experiences since the event. He testified that since the June Fourth crackdown, the government has refused to admit to any wrongdoing, has not taken responsibility for its actions and has been mistreating and persecuting victims in the decades following the massacre. Also, Fang made a call for China to establish a committee for truth to find out who ordered the massacre in an effort to achieve justice for victims and true freedom for all of China.

On the twenty-third anniversary of the June Fourth crackdown, Fang attended an annual rally and candle-light vigil at Victoria Park in Hong Kong. At the memorial, Fang gave a speech in which he stated “I have come to talk to people, especially young people, so that they can know the truth about the June 4 killings…” and that “the most effective weapon to fight the communist regime is to refuse to forget what the government wants us to forget, and to refuse to forget what the government has done.” During his trip to Hong Kong, he also visited activists from the Hong Kong Federation of Students who had been participating in a 64-hour hunger strike at Times Square (Hong Kong) in Causeway Bay.

Fang is the president of Chinese Democracy Education Foundation, an organization “promoting the common principle and general ideas of the prosperity and progress of Chinese society for democracy, freedom, human rights and constitutional reform.”

== Personal life ==
Fang Zheng lives in the San Francisco Bay Area with his three daughters.
