= Yang Jianli =

Chinese dissident

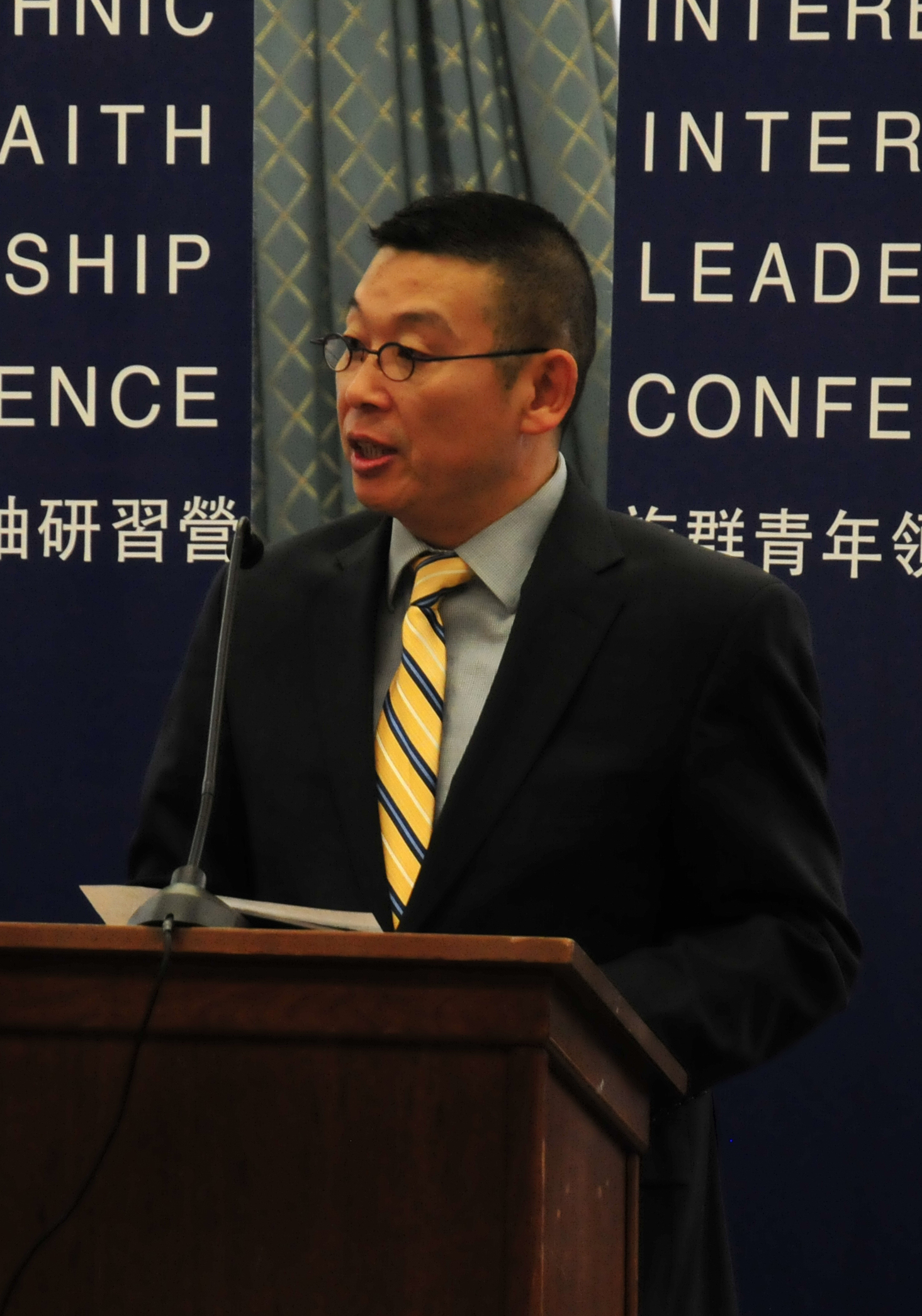
- Born: August 15, 1963 (age 63); Shandong, People's Republic of China
- Education: Liaocheng University (BS); Beijing Normal University (MS); University of California, Berkeley (PhD); Harvard University (PhD)

Yang Jianli
- Traditional Chinese: 楊建利
- Simplified Chinese: 杨建利
Transcriptions
Standard Mandarin
- Hanyu Pinyin: Yáng Jiànlì

Yang Jianli (Chinese: 杨建利; born August 15, 1963) is a Chinese dissident, mathematician, and political scientist with a United States residency. He is the son of a Communist Party leader. Yang was detained in China in 2002 and was released in 2007. He now lives in the United States, where he is a human rights activist.

== Early life and education ==
Yang was born in Lanling County, Linyi, southern Shandong, China. He was a Tiananmen Square activist in 1989, came to the United States, earned two doctorates—a Ph.D. in political economy from Harvard University and a second Ph.D. in mathematics from the University of California, Berkeley—and then founded the Foundation for China in the 21st Century. He was blacklisted by the government of the People's Republic of China, which also refused to renew his passport, because of his political activism.

== Imprisonment ==
Yang returned to China in April 2002 on a friend's passport to view labor unrest in northeast China. He was detained when trying to board a domestic flight, and held incommunicado by the Chinese in violation of their own and international law. His wife and children, as well as his extended family, were denied access and were concerned for his health and safety while he was in prison. The advocacy group Freedom Now took up his case.

=== International reactions ===
On May 28, 2003, a United Nations working group on arbitrary detention ruled that Yang Jianli had been held by the Chinese government in violation of international law. On June 25, the U.S. House of Representatives unanimously passed H.Res.199 and the U.S. Senate introduced S.Res.184.

On August 4, 2003, the United States called on China to release Yang. "We've raised the case repeatedly with senior Chinese officials, and we urge that Dr. Yang be released and allowed to return to his family here in the United States," US State Department deputy spokesman Philip Reeker said.

=== Petitioning by lawmakers and academics ===
On December 8, 2003, a letter from Harvard University Law School with 29 faculty signatures was sent via FedEx to Wen Jiabao through the Chinese Embassy. Two days later, letters from Harvard University John F. Kennedy School of Government and Medical School with 78 faculty signatures were sent to Wen Jiabao via the same methods.

On April 26, 2004, members of Congress held a press conference to commemorate the second anniversary of Yang's detention. 67 legislators issued a warning in a letter to Hu as they marked the second year in detention of Yang Jianli. Citing Vice President Dick Cheney, Republican Party lawmaker Christopher Cox said meanwhile that the US embassy in Beijing spoke directly with the Chinese government about Yang's case.

On May 13, 2004, the Beijing No. 2 Intermediate People's Court returned a guilty verdict and sentenced Yang to five years in prison for espionage and illegal entry.

A few months later, on October 6, 21 U.S. senators and 85 U.S. representatives wrote a petition to Hu Jintao to grant Yang parole. On June 15, 2005, a bipartisan group of 40 U.S. senators (including Jon Kyl, Barbara Mikulski, Hillary Clinton, John McCain, Ted Kennedy, and Bob Dole) sent a letter to Chinese President Hu Jintao urging Yang's release.

On April 10, 2006, 119 US lawmakers urged Bush to raise Yang Jianli's case. Later, on September 3, Yang Jianli was released on the condition that he leave China immediately. However, Yang first insisted on returning to his hometown to sweep his father's tomb. As a result, he was once again imprisoned while at the airport.

== Return to the United States ==
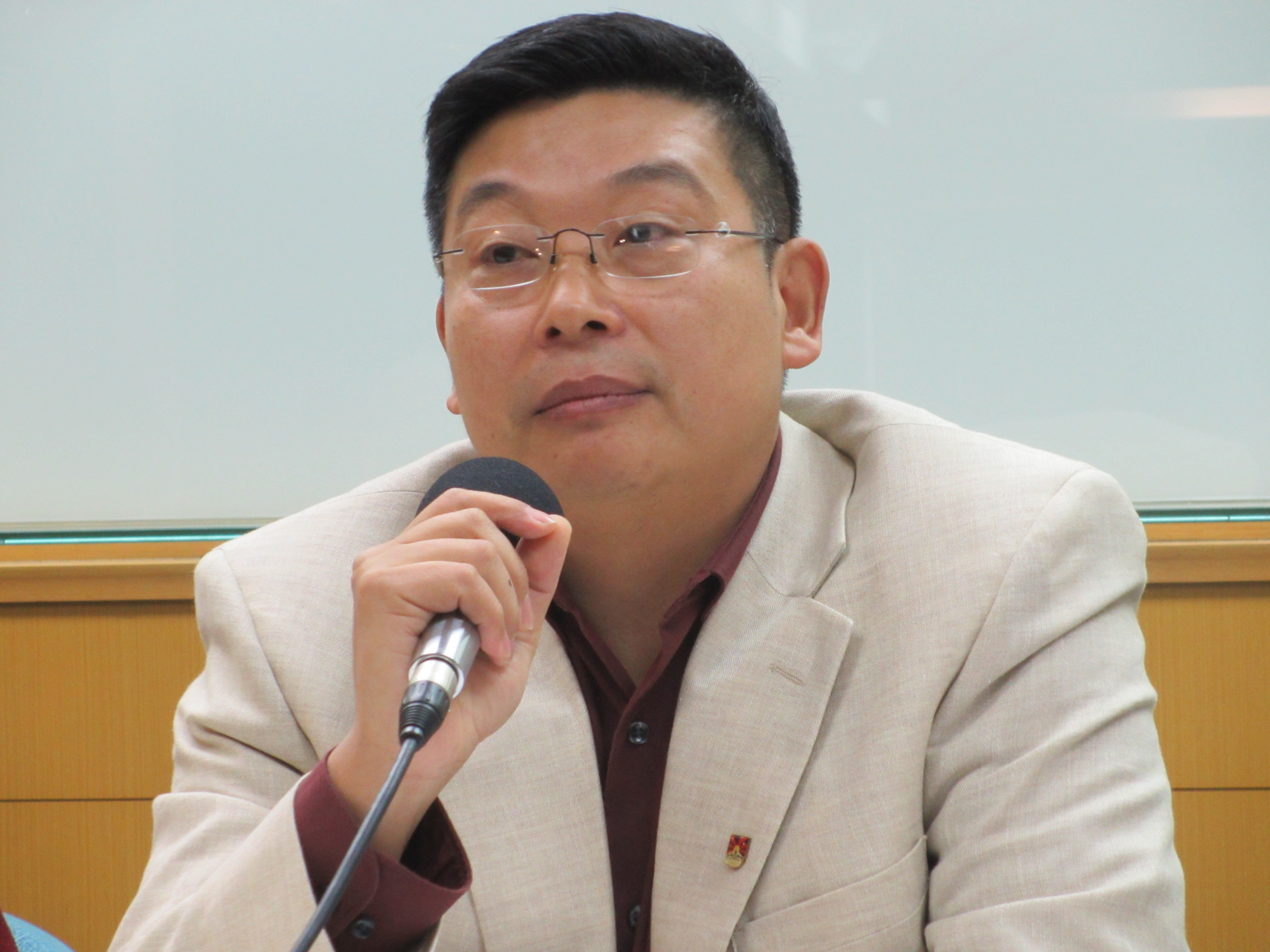
Yang Jianli on 23 November 2013

On April 27, 2007, Yang was released from Chinese prison but was not allowed to leave China. Later, on August 19, he was finally allowed to return to the United States.

Reminded of his experience with the June 4, Tiananmen Square protests of 1989 for freedom of speech and democracy, Yang's recent article in The Washington Post shortly after his return to the United States reflects his vivid observation of the 2007 Burmese anti-government protests, spiritually coined as Saffron Revolution, including China's 'parasitic relationship with Burma' and the genuine will of freedom-loving intellectuals around the world condemning the current brutal oppressions in Burma.

In March 2016, together with Fang Zheng and Zhou Fengsuo, Yang published an op-ed in The Washington Post protesting Donald Trump's characterization of the Tiananmen Square Massacre as the act of a "strong, powerful government".

He has been a guest speaker at the Geneva Summit for Human Rights and Democracy on several occasions, and is the founder of the NGO, Initiatives for China, a US-based organisation dedicated to working for a peaceful transition to democracy in China. He also established the Foundation for China in the 21st Century.

In 2016, he organised an Interfaith Conference of China's ethnic and religious minorities in Dharamshala, India, which is home to the Dalai Lama's residence and the headquarters of the Central Tibetan Administration (the Tibetan government in exile). The conference has brought together representatives of the Uyghurs, Mongolians, Christians, Falun Gong; and the people of Taiwan, Hong Kong, and Macau.

In June 2016, Yang organised an event in Washington D.C. to commemorate the 27th anniversary of the Tiananmen Square crackdown in China. Its technical systems were hacked, so that some participants in other countries could not fully communicate.

In March 2018, Yang was invited to speak by the advocacy group UN Watch at the UN Human Rights Council but Chinese diplomat Chen Cheng repeatedly interrupted in a failed attempt to halt the address. In his talk, Yang questioned the Chinese Communist Party's right to represent China at the United Nations and criticized its human rights abuses.

In 2020, Yang applied for United States citizenship but was rejected due to his former membership in the Chinese Communist Party. In response, Yang sued the federal government, which agreed to make him eligible to apply for citizenship again in four years.

Yang is a primary target of the Chinese government's disinformation networks.

== See also ==
- Chinese democracy movement
- List of Chinese dissidents
- 1989 Tiananmen Square protests and massacre
