= UN Watch =

Non-governmental organization

United Nations Watch
- Founded: 1993
- Type: Non-governmental organization
- Location: Geneva, Switzerland
- Fields: UN monitoring, human rights advocacy
- Key people: Alfred H. Moses, Chair; Per Ahlmark, David A. Harris, Co-Chairs; Hillel Neuer, Executive Director; Morris B. Abram, Founder
- Website: www.unwatch.org

UN Watch is a pro-Israel advocacy group (Note: Sources describing UN Watch as a pro-Israel advocacy group:) that primarily denounces what it views as anti-Israel sentiment at the UN and UN-sponsored events. The organisation also denounces human rights abuses including in the Democratic Republic of the Congo, Darfur, China, Cuba, Russia and Venezuela, often using its allotted time at the UNHRC to allow for dissidents and human rights activists to speak.

UN Watch is a Geneva-based non-governmental organization (NGO) whose stated mission is "to monitor the performance of the United Nations by the yardstick of its own Charter". UN Watch is not part of the United Nations. It participates at UN as an accredited NGO in Special Consultative Status to the UN Economic and Social Council.

== Founding ==
UN Watch was founded in 1993 under the chairmanship of Morris B. Abram. Abram served as the Chairman of the United Negro College Fund and President of Brandeis University. Abram was active in community affairs as President of the American Jewish Committee (1963–1968); Chairman of the National Coalition Supporting Soviet Jewry (1983–1988); and Chairman of the Conference of Presidents of Major American Jewish Organizations (1986–1989).

Abram supported the UN as an institution. In 1999, Abram delivered a speech to the U.S. Congress on the subject of the treatment of Israel by the United Nations in which he said "UN Watch categorically supports the UN as an indispensable institution. The US should pay its past dues to the UN as a matter of national honor and in recognition of the UN's importance. In spite of the UN's flaws, it is inconceivable that the US withhold support from the only truly global organization in such an interdependent world."

After Abram died in 2000, David A. Harris, Executive Director of the American Jewish Committee, was elected Chairman of UN Watch. In 2001, Harris announced that UN Watch had become a wholly owned subsidiary of the American Jewish Committee. According to a press release at the time, "UN Watch was established with the generous assistance of Edgar Bronfman, president of the World Jewish Congress. Eighteen months ago, the American Jewish Committee and the World Jewish Congress reached an agreement, approved by the international board of UN Watch, to transfer full control of the organization to AJC, an agreement that went into effect on January 1, 2001."

== Structure and status ==
UN Watch participates at the UN as an accredited NGO in Special Consultative Status to the UN Economic and Social Council (ECOSOC) and as an Associate NGO to the UN Department of Public Information (DPI). It was affiliated with the American Jewish Committee until 2013.

UN Watch has participated in the United Nations Commission on Human Rights, a Panel Discussion on the United Nations and the Middle East, a Panel Discussion on Proposals to Reform the Commission on Human Rights, the Sub-Commission for the Promotion and Protection of Human Rights, the Committee on the Elimination of Racial Discrimination, and the Working Group on Minorities. A UN Watch seminar in Geneva featured a tour of the Palais des Nations, a visit to the International Red Cross and Red Crescent Museum, and attendance at a meeting of the Committee Against Torture (CAT) with briefings from the Committee's Vice Chair.

UN Watch had 110 members in 2007, geographically distributed as follows: 56% from Europe, 38% from North America, and 4% from Oceania. In October 2008, UNHCR listed the organization as having a staff of six.

== Board and funding ==
UN Watch is funded by private individual donations and charitable foundations.

Current board members are:

- Diego Arria, former Permanent Representative for Venezuela to the United Nations and President of the Security Council
- Jean-Claude Buhrer
- Irwin Cotler, human rights advocate, former Canadian Member of Parliament, former Minister of Justice and Attorney General of Canada, Founder and Chair of the Raoul Wallenberg Centre for Human Rights.
- Yang Jianli, Chinese dissident with United States residency and human rights activist
- Garry Kasparov, Russian dissident and former world chess champion
- Mark P. Lagon political scientist and practitioner, Chief Policy Officer at Friends of the Global Fight Against AIDS, Tuberculosis, and Malaria and a Distinguished Senior Scholar at Georgetown University's School of Foreign Service.
- Katrina Lantos Swett President of the Lantos Foundation, former Chair of the United States Commission on International Religious Freedom
- Gert Weisskirchen, German politician and former Member of the Bundestag

Former board members include:

- Per Ahlmark, former Deputy Prime Minister of Sweden
- Max Jakobson, former Finnish Ambassador to the United Nations
- David A. Harris, Executive Director of the American Jewish Committee
- Ruth Wedgwood, Professor of International Law and Diplomacy, Johns Hopkins University
- Alfred H. Moses, Attorney, former United States Ambassador to Romania and Presidential Emissary for the Cyprus Conflict, Special Counsel to President Jimmy Carter.

== Positions and activities ==
=== Regions ===
==== Congo ====
In 2008, UN Watch denounced the elimination of the post of United Nations special rapporteur for the Congo at the United Nations Human Rights Council which was done with the support of Egypt, Algeria, Tunisia, Russia and other countries following a request by the Congolese administration. Other rights groups called for the reestablishment of the post. In December 2009, UN Watch said a total of 50 groupings had signed the appeal to UN Secretary General Ban Ki-moon and human rights chief Navi Pillay, asking to restore the post of UN rights monitor there.

==== Darfur ====
On 27 April 2008, UN Watch joined human rights organizations around the world in launching a "Justice for Darfur" campaign. The organizations behind the campaign included Amnesty International, Human Rights First and Human Rights Watch. The campaign called on the United Nations Security Council, regional organizations and national governments to pressure Sudan to cooperate with the International Criminal Court, and to arrest suspected war criminals Ali Kushayb and Ahmad Harun. The Sudanese government had refused to surrender either suspect to the Court, and had in fact promoted Harun to the position of State Minister for Humanitarian Affairs.

==== Iran ====
UN Watch commended the US, France and other democracies for their "forceful criticism" of Iran's human rights record at a UN hearing in Geneva's UN Human Rights Council (UNHRC) in February 2010.

==== Switzerland ====
Following Switzerland's 2009 vote to ban minarets, UN Watch stated that it was particularly embarrassed by the fact and that it will work toward its repeal. The NGO's director Hillel Neuer said that banning of Muslim structures by a government is wrongful discrimination.

=== UNHRC elections ===
Along with Freedom House, UN Watch has opposed the candidacies of states with poor human rights records for the United Nations Human Rights Council. The 2006 UN resolution establishing the council requires that, in electing states to the panel, UN member states "shall take into account the contribution of candidates to the promotion and protection of human rights."

==== 2007 ====
In May 2007, UN Watch and Freedom House submitted a joint report on an election to the United Nations Human Rights Council, stating that candidates Angola, Belarus, Egypt and Qatar were unfit to sit on the human rights body, because they themselves violated rights. The report said that the four countries "are authoritarian regimes with negative UN voting records (on rights issues) and are not qualified to be Council members". The report further described candidates Slovenia, Denmark, Italy and the Netherlands as "well qualified" for the Council, and called candidates Bolivia, India, Indonesia, Madagascar, Nicaragua, the Philippines and South Africa as "questionable".

==== 2009 ====
In May 2009, UN Watch and Freedom House again submitted a joint report on a UNHRC election. The report described candidates China, Cuba and Saudi Arabia as "the worst of the worst" in terms of human rights. The report also described candidates Azerbaijan, Cameroon, Djibouti and Russia as "not qualified", and Bangladesh, Jordan, Kenya, Kyrgyzstan, Nigeria and Senegal as "questionable". UN Watch and Freedom House described the council's record for its first three years as poor. They stated that Islamic countries with Cuban support rewrote rules for a freedom of expression monitor in a manner that limits expression, and that an "alliance of regressive regimes" succeeded in having the Council cancel human rights investigators for trouble spots such as Belarus, Cuba, Liberia, the Democratic Republic of Congo and Darfur. In contrast, they said, the alliance led to the council appointing an investigator who was involved in founding a controversial human rights prize in honor of Muammar al-Gaddafi and another who believes that the 9/11 attacks were an inside job. Hillel Neuer said, "The vision had been that the council would be a voice for victims, but it is now in a state of crisis."

==== 2010 ====
UN Watch expressed alarm over a report that Asian countries might facilitate Iran's election in May 2010 to the 47-member UNHRC.

==== 2011 ====
UN Watch is credited with leading the campaign to deny Syria's bid for a seat.

==== 2014 ====
UN Watch strongly condemned the 2014 elections of Saudi Arabia, China, Cuba, and Russia to the Human Rights Council. In an interview by France 24, executive director Hillel Neuer called this a "black day for human rights." A campaign to remove these countries from the body, "Dictator-free HRC" is ongoing along with a petition on the organization's website.

=== Other UN activities ===
==== Goldstone Report ====
UN Watch submitted a 29-page legal petition to the United Nations Fact Finding Mission on the Gaza Conflict requesting the recusal of member Christine Chinkin because she was one of 31 academics and lawyers who had co-signed a letter published in the Sunday Times before being selected for the mission that accused Israel of not complying with international humanitarian and human rights law. The letter described Israel's military offensive in Gaza as "an act of aggression", stating that "invasion and bombardment of Gaza amounts to collective punishment of Gaza's 1.5m inhabitants contrary to international humanitarian and human rights law", and adding that "the blockade of humanitarian relief, the destruction of civilian infrastructure, and preventing access to basic necessities such as food and fuel, are prima facie war crimes". UN Watch stated that, since Chinkin had already formed and expressed a judgment on the very issues the Mission was meant to investigate, she could not fulfill the impartiality requirement for fact-finding missions. The petition cites authorities of international law, including a 2004 precedent of the international tribunal for Sierra Leone, in which Justice Geoffrey Robertson was disqualified by his fellow judges over the appearance of bias.

The UN Watch request was covered by the Deutsche Presse Agentur and the Khaleej Times and Agence France Presse. UN Watch further noted that in a May 2009 meeting with Geneva NGOs, Chinkin denied that her impartiality was compromised, saying that her statement only addressed jus ad bellum, and not jus in bello; however, according to UN Watch, the statement not only determined that "Israel's actions amount to aggression, not self-defence," but additionally charged that they were "contrary to international humanitarian and human rights law," and constituted "prima facie war crimes."

The inquiry members rejected the petition and said that the mission investigated whether Israel, Hamas or the Palestinian Authority had unnecessarily caused death or injury to innocent civilians by specific acts of armed conflict that violated international humanitarian law and international human rights law stating "On those issues the letter co-signed by Professor Chinkin expressed no view at all." The members further wrote in their reply that the fact-finding mission cannot be considered a judicial or even a quasi-judicial proceeding. Hillel Neuer, director of UN Watch, said that the arguments raised by the mission ignored the well-established set of standards to international fact-finding missions. Goldstone said that the letter signed by Chinkin could have been the grounds for disqualification, had the mission been a judicial inquiry.

==== Israel and antisemitism ====
UN Watch is active at the UN in combating what it considers anti-Israel and anti-Semitic attitudes, and what it dubs the selective and politicized treatment of Israel by many UN bodies. The group supported former Secretary General Kofi Annan's declared goal of ending the UN's imbalanced treatment of Israel and has been highly critical of the United Nations Human Rights Council. The Jewish Telegraphic Agency has described U.N. Watch as a pro-Israel organization.

===== March 2007 UNHRC speech =====
On 23 March 2007, UN Watch's Hillel Neuer delivered a harshly critical speech to the United Nations Human Rights Council (UNHRC), stating that the Council had betrayed the dreams of its founders and become "a nightmare". Neuer charged that the Council ignores human rights abuses worldwide, opting instead to enact "one resolution after another condemning one single state: Israel". He further argued that the Council's stated concern for Palestinian human rights is deceptive, and provided examples where he said it ignored atrocities against Palestinians "because Israel could not be blamed. … The despots who run this Council couldn't care less about Palestinians, or about any human rights. They seek to demonize Israeli democracy, to delegitimize the Jewish state, to scapegoat the Jewish people."

=== Other ===
==== Sexual exploitation ====
UN Watch, the World YWCA, and the World Alliance of YMCAs published a statement against sexual exploitation and child pornography. "Today far too many children are sexually exploited and abused causing lifelong damage. More than two million children are exploited in the multibillion-dollar sex industry each year and 1.2 million children are trafficked annually", the statement said.

== Reception ==
Former UN Secretary General Kofi Annan has said "I deeply appreciate the valuable work performed by UN Watch. I believe that informed and independent evaluation of the United Nations' activities will prove a vital source as we seek to adapt the Organization to the needs of a changing world."

Ian Williams, former president of the United Nations Correspondents Association and author of The UN For Beginners, wrote in an opinion piece in The Guardian in 2007 that the main objective of UN Watch "is to attack the United Nations in general, and its human rights council in particular, for alleged bias against Israel". Williams supported UN Watch's condemnation of the UN Human Rights Council as a hypocritical organization, but also accused UN Watch itself of hypocrisy for failing to denounce what he called "manifest Israeli transgressions against the human rights of Palestinians."

Claudia Rosett, a journalist-in-residence with the conservative Foundation for Defense of Democracies, praised UN Watch as "stalwart and invaluable".

The American journalist and political activist Phyllis Bennis described UN Watch as a "small Geneva-based right-wing organisation" that is "hardly known outside of UN headquarters". She stressed that "undermining and delegitimising" Richard Falk through "scurrilous accusations" has been an "obsession of UN Watch" when he became Special Rapporteur.

Agence France-Presse described UN Watch in 2009 as "a lobby group with strong ties to Israel". The Economist has described UN Watch as a "pro-Israeli monitor".
