= Néstor Rodríguez Lobaina =

Cuban democracy activist

Néstor Rodríguez Lobaina is a Cuban democracy activist. He is the older brother of Rolando Rodríguez Lobaina.

He founded the Alternative Studies Center of the Cuban Youth for Democracy Movement. He was arrested in 1999 when he began a hunger strike in support of the Tamarindo 34 hunger strikers. He was arrested again in 2000 and sentenced to 6 years in prison. Amnesty International recognized him as a prisoner of conscience.

He was released in July 2005. He explained his gratitude to Amnesty International members who helped him.
