= No Enemies, No Hatred =

No Enemies, No Hatred: Selected Essays and Poems
- 2012 cover design by Jill Breitbarth
- Editors: Liu Xia, Perry Link and Tienchi Martin-Liao (foreword by Václav Havel)
- Author: Liu Xiaobo
- Original title: Ich habe keine Feinde, ich kenne keinen Hass (in German)
- Cover artist: Jill Breitbarth
- Language: English
- Subject: Chinese politics; Human rights
- Genre: Chinese literature; Literary criticism; Poetry
- Publisher: Belknap Press
- Publication date: 2011
- Publication place: China
- English publication date: January 2012
- Media type: Print (Paperback & eBook)
- Pages: 366
- Award: Prix Jan Michalski Nominee for Longlist (2011)
- ISBN: 978-0-674-06147-7
- OCLC: 1099185710
- Dewey Decimal: 895.1452
- LC Class: PL2879.X53A2

No Enemies, No Hatred is a book by Nobel Peace Prize-winning writer and activist Liu Xiaobo which contains a wide selection of his writings and poetry between 1989 and 2009. It was published in 2012 by the Belknap Press, an imprint of Harvard University Press. It was edited by Perry Link, Tienchi Martin-Liao and Liu Xiaobo's wife Liu Xia, and includes a foreword written by Václav Havel. The volume marks the inaugural English-language collection of Liu's work.

== Reception ==
PD Smith of The Guardian wrote: "Liu's essays and poems [...] speak eloquently of his fearless commitment to defending human dignity, as well as his insight into China's history and culture." Thor Halvorssen of Forbes called it "a provocatively sophisticated compendium of observations of contemporary Chinese authoritarian society". According to Jonathan Mirsky of The New York Times, "Liu demonstrates a considerable amount of anger while retaining his Gandhian nonviolent spirit".

== See also ==
- I Have No Enemies
