= All China Lawyers Association =

Bar association in China

- 中华全国律师协会
- Formation: July 7, 1986; 39 years ago
- Type: People's organization
- Headquarters: Beijing, China
- Region served: China
- Official language: Chinese
- President: Wang Junfeng
- Parent organization: Ministry of Justice
- Website: www.acla.org.cn

All China Lawyers Association (ACLA) is a people's organization and official professional association for lawyers of the People's Republic of China. It was founded on 7 July 1986. It carries out professional administration over lawyers in pursuit of law.

In August 1998, the American Bar Association offered to assist the All-China Lawyers Association in preparing an independent bar. Under the general secretaryship of Xi Jinping, Xi Jinping Thought was added to the association's charter.

== Function ==
One of its six special committees is the Committee for the Protection of Lawyers' Lawful Rights, the largest committee that plays an increasingly role in protecting lawyers' rights and interests.

Lawyer Mo Shaoping is a member of the Human Rights and Constitutional Law Committee of the All China Lawyers Association. Specialized in criminal law, he and his cohort are known internationally for many politically sensitive cases, including that of Liu Xiaobo.

== See also ==
- Weiquan lawyers
- Weiquan movement
