= Marie Holzman =

French sinologist (born 1952)

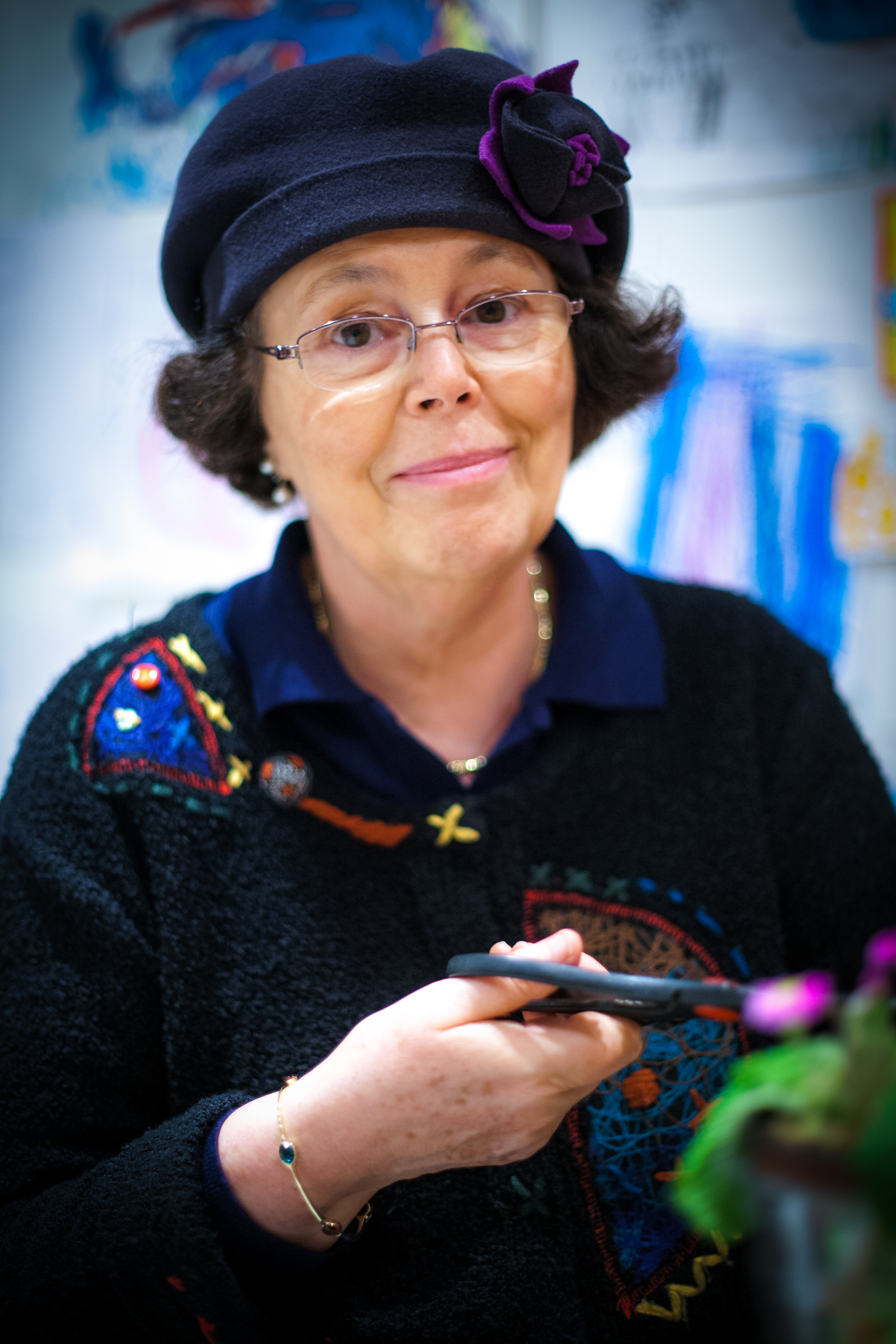
Marie Holzman

Marie Holzman (born 4 January 1952) is a French sinologist, university professor of Chinese, writer, journalist and translator. Her research focuses on contemporary China and Chinese dissidents.

== Biography ==
Holzman was born in Paris. Between 1972 and 1980, she stayed in Asia in Taiwan, the People's Republic of China and Japan. She was a student in Beijing when the first Beijing Spring broke out in 1978. Since then, she has supported the victims of repression in China.

Holzman is professor of Chinese, a teaching assistant at Paris Diderot University and was the director of the Chinese section of the DESS-NCI programme of the University of Sorbonne Nouvelle Paris 3 from 1984 to 2002.

She is the chairwoman of the association Solidarité Chine ("Solidarity China") that was established in 1989 after the Tiananmen Square protests. She is also a board member of Human Rights in China (HRIC), a member of the Asia-Democracy Forum and a spokeswoman of the Collectif Pékin J.O. 2008. Her aim is to "echo the voice of those who take on pro-democracy stands, so that the West understands that the Chinese are not all fascinated by business and artwork counterfeiting."

Holzman published documented works about prominent figures of the Chinese democracy movement, including Wei Jingsheng, Lin Xiling, Ding Zilin, Hu Ping and Liu Qing. She gave lectures about contemporary China at the Bank of France, the National Institute for Oriental Languages and Civilizations (INALCO) and the Paris Foreign Missions Society.

She regularly writes for the French political magazine Politique internationale.

Holzman created the publishing series Les Moutons Noirs (lit. 'The Black Sheep') algonside Jean-François Bouthors and Galia Ackerman, with the support of Pierre Bergé.

On 31 December 2008 Holzman was named a Knight of the Legion of Honour. She was awarded the decoration by Pierre Bergé (who, at the time, was in a conflict with Beijing about the selling of two bronze pieces of the Old Summer Palace) on 2 June 2009, the day before the 20th anniversary of the Tian'anmen massacre, on behalf of President Nicolas Sarkozy.

Holzman's works are notably influenced by Vladimir Bukovsky.

== Actions about Tibet ==
In 2008, Holzman became the spokeswoman of the Collectif Jeux Olympiques 2008. She called for sportspeople and foreign officials to boycott the 2008 Summer Olympics opening ceremony as long as the Chinese leaders do not change their mind on the repression and the imprisonment of Tibetan opponents.

== Works ==
- Avec les Chinois, Flammarion, 1981, ISBN 2080643606
- Pékin et ses environs, with Danièle Crisà and René Giudicelli, Arthaud, 1986, 1992, ISBN 2700305701
- Chinois de Paris, Seghers, 1989
- Chine, Arthaud, 1992, ISBN 2700306856
- Comment Lü Dongbin devint immortel, with Chao-Pao Chen, Gallimard, 1995, ISBN 2070583562
- Chine, on ne bâillonne pas la lumière with Noël Mamère, Ramsay, 1997 ISBN 2841142000
- Lin Xiling l’indomptable, Bayard éditions/Centurion, 1998, ISBN 222713500X
- L'empire des Bas-fonds, by writer Liao Yiwu, translation, Bleu de Chine, 2003, ISBN 2910884600
- Écrits édifiants et curieux sur la Chine du XXIe with Chen Yan, Editions de l’Aube, 2004, original language: Chinese, ISBN 2876789302
- La pensée manipulée, Le cas chinois, Hu Ping, Editions de l’Aube, 2004, translation, ISBN 2876789299
- Wei Jingsheng, un chinois inflexible, with Bernard Debord, Bleu de Chine, 6 avril 2005, ISBN 2849310018
- Chine, à quand la démocratie ? : Les illusions de la modernisation with Hu Ping, 2005, ISBN 2752600771 (2007, ISBN 2752603118)
- Pourquoi il faut boycotter la cérémonie d'ouverture des JO de Pékin with RSF and Marc Raimbourg, Le Cherche Midi, 2008, ISBN 2749113180
- L'Envers des médailles : JO de Pékin 2008, Bleu de Chine, 2008, ISBN 2849310352
- Quand la terre s'est ouverte au Sichuan : Journal d'une tragédie by Liao Yiwu, translation with Marc Raimbourg, 2010, Buchet-Chastel, ISBN 2283024315
- Dans l’empire des ténèbres, by Liao Yiwu, with Marc Raimbourg and Gao Yun, series Les moutons noirs, Books, 2014, ISBN 2366080638

=== Prefaces ===
- Liao Yiwu, Dieu est rouge, translated by Hervé Denès, series Les moutons noirs, Bourin, 2015, ISBN 2366080670
- Gyaltsen Drölkar, L'insoumise de Lhassa, douze ans dans les prisons chinoises au Tibet, series Les moutons noirs, Bourin, 2011, ISBN 978-2-84941-227-5
- Cai Chongguo, J'étais à Tien An Men, Esprit Du Temps, 2009, ISBN 2847951636
- Les Massacres de la Révolution culturelle, texts collected by Song Yongyi, translated by Marc Raimbourg, 2008, Buchet-Chastel, ISBN 2283022010
