= The Most Wanted Man In China =

2013 autobiography by Fang Lizhi

- Author: Fang Lizhi
- Original title: 自傳
- Translator: Perry Link
- Language: Traditional Chinese
- Genre: Autobiography, Biography, Non-fiction
- Publisher: 天下文化 (World Culture, Taiwan), Henry Holt and Co. (English translation)
- Publication date: July 2013
- Publication place: China
- English publication date: February 2016
- Media type: Print
- Pages: 704
- ISBN: 978-986-320-187-8 (Traditional Chinese); 978-1627794992 (English)

The Most Wanted Man in China: My Journey from Scientist to Enemy of the State
- Traditional Chinese: 自傳
Transcriptions

The Most Wanted Man in China: My Journey from Scientist to Enemy of the State is the autobiography of the Chinese astrophysicist and activist Fang Lizhi. Fang narrates his experiences from youth through his 1989 request for asylum at the U.S. embassy in Beijing.

In the introduction, dated October 27, 1989, Fang provides a brief overview of his present circumstances in the embassy. He then begins the book with a review of his family origins, before delving into the politics, science and personal relationships of his life as a Communist Party member and physicist through the Anti-Rightist Campaign, Great Leap Forward and Cultural Revolution.

Fang notes the animosity of the Communist Party to relativity and cosmology as well as parallels between his situation and that of Galileo.

== Reception ==
Richard Bernstein said in the New York Times that the book is "remarkably cool, precise and in places even good-humored".

In The New York Review of Books, Freeman Dyson wrote that Fang has "..a two sided heritage...a role model for a group of rebellious spirits...[and] the rebirth of Chinese science as a full partner in the emerging world community of inquiring minds".

== Publication details ==
- July 2013, World Culture (天下文化出版股份有限公司), ISBN 978-9863201878, hardcover, Traditional Chinese
- February 2016, Henry Holt and Co., ISBN 978-1627794992, 332 pages, hardcover (translated into English as The Most Wanted Man in China: My Journey from Scientist to Enemy of the State by Perry Link)
- February 2017, St. Martin's Griffin, ISBN 978-1250116550, 332 pages, paperback

== See also ==
- 方励之 (Chinese Wikipedia biography page of Fang Lizhi)
