= First Affiliated Hospital of China Medical University =

Coordinates: 41.773752°N 123.426687°E

- Ministry of Health (China)

Geography
- Location: Heping District, Shenyang, Liaoning, China

Organisation
- Care system: Public
- Type: General and teaching
- Affiliated university: China Medical University School of Medicine

Services
- Standards: 3A hospital
- Emergency department: Yes

History
- Opened: 1908

Links
- Website: http://www.cmu1h.com
- Lists: Hospitals in China

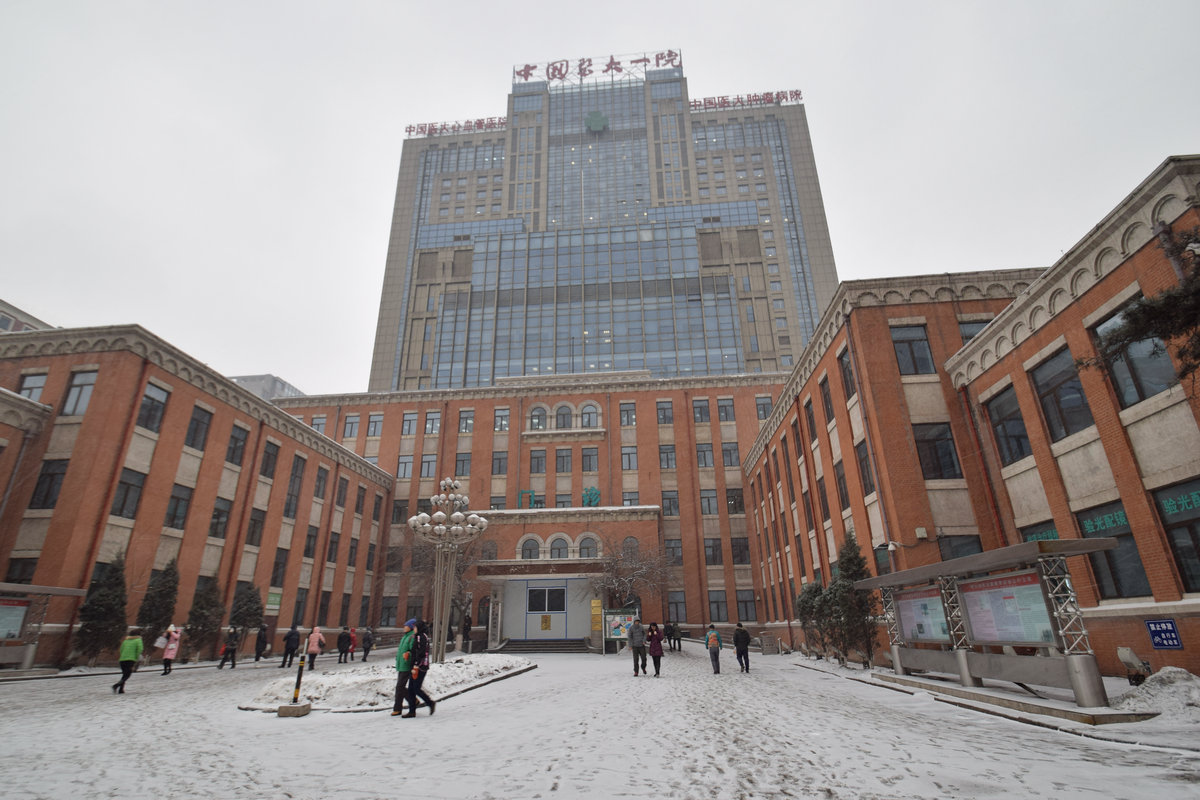
First Affiliated Hospital of China Medical University

The First Affiliated Hospital of China Medical University (simplified Chinese: 中国医科大学附属第一医院; traditional Chinese: 中國醫科大學附屬第一醫院; pinyin: Zhōngguó Yīkē Dàxué Fùshǔ Dìyī Yīyuàn), or the First Hospital of China Medical University, is a large comprehensive Grade A tertiary hospital located in Heping, Shenyang of China. It was founded in 1908 and is now affiliated to the Ministry of Health of the People's Republic of China and the China Medical University (Liaoning).

== History ==
The First Affiliated Hospital of China Medical University has two predecessors: the Fujian Changting Gospel Hospital and the Shenyang South Manchuria Railway Company Fengtian Hospital, both were founded in October 1908.

In 1933, the Gospel Hospital was reorganized into the Central Red Hospital, and then became the affiliated hospital of the Chinese Workers' and Peasants' Red Army Health School, which was later renamed "China Medical University" in Yan'an.

In 1941, Mao Zedong wrote an inscription for the students of China Medical University in Yan'an: "救死扶傷，實行革命的人道主義" (Save the dying and the wounded, and practice revolutionary humanitarianism), which later became the motto for all hospitals in China.

After the liberation of Shenyang in 1948, the Affiliated Hospital of China Medical University took over the Fengtian Hospital of the South Manchuria Railway Company, which was also founded in October 1908.

During the war years, the hospital treated many Red Army leaders, including Mao Zedong, Chen Yun, He Long and Luo Ronghuan. On the Long March, it also saved Zhou Enlai, who was in critical condition.

In early 1995, Ma Xiaowei, then president of the hospital and later vice minister of the Ministry of Health, pioneered the "patient-centered" service concept. His reform achievements attracted the attention of the health circles at home and abroad.

In 2017, Liu Xiaobo, a Chinese political prisoner, dissident, and Nobel Peace Prize winner who was suffering from advanced liver cancer, was released on medical parole and received treatment at the hospital. He died there on July 13.

On October 18, 2019, the hospital was approved to become one of the first batch of Internet hospitals in Liaoning Province. It then organized and routinely carried out the 5G smart hospital projects, covering surgery, consultation, handover, ward rounds, teaching, patient education, scientific research, etc.

== Current situation ==
The First Hospital of China Medical University has developed into a well-known regional center for medical treatment, education and research. It has two campuses, Heping and Hunnan, covering a building area of 335,000 square meters, and has a staff team of 4,350 members.

The hospital is strong at the diagnosis and treatment of difficult, emergency and severe diseases. Annually, the number of outpatients and emergency visits reached 3.35 million and the number of patients discharged amounted to 159,000. There are 2,249 beds.

In 2008, the hospital ranked 9th among national medical institutions in terms of the total number of domestic papers published. The total number of SCI-indexed papers ranks 16th. And there are papers published on prestigious academic journals.

The hospital is the only national emergency medical rescue center and primary trauma treatment center in the three northeastern provinces designated by the National Health and Family Planning Commission.

As the "First Clinical College" of China Medical University, the hospital is also a teaching hospital for both undergraduate and postgraduate students of the university.

== Ranking ==
- In the performance evaluation of national tertiary public hospitals by the State Council, the First Affiliated Hospital of China Medical University ranks 17th in the country and first in the Northeast region.
- In the "China Hospital and Specialty Reputation Rankings" released by Fudan University, it has ranked among the top 20 in the country and first in the Northeast for 12 consecutive years.
- In the 2019 "China Hospital Science and Technology Value (STEM)" list by the Chinese Academy of Medical Sciences, it ranked 12th nation-wide, and first in the Northeast for 7 consecutive years.

== See also ==
- Sheng Jing Hospital
- China Medical University (PRC)
- List of hospitals in China
