= Liu Xia (poet) =

Chinese painter, poet, and photographer (born 1961)

- 刘霞
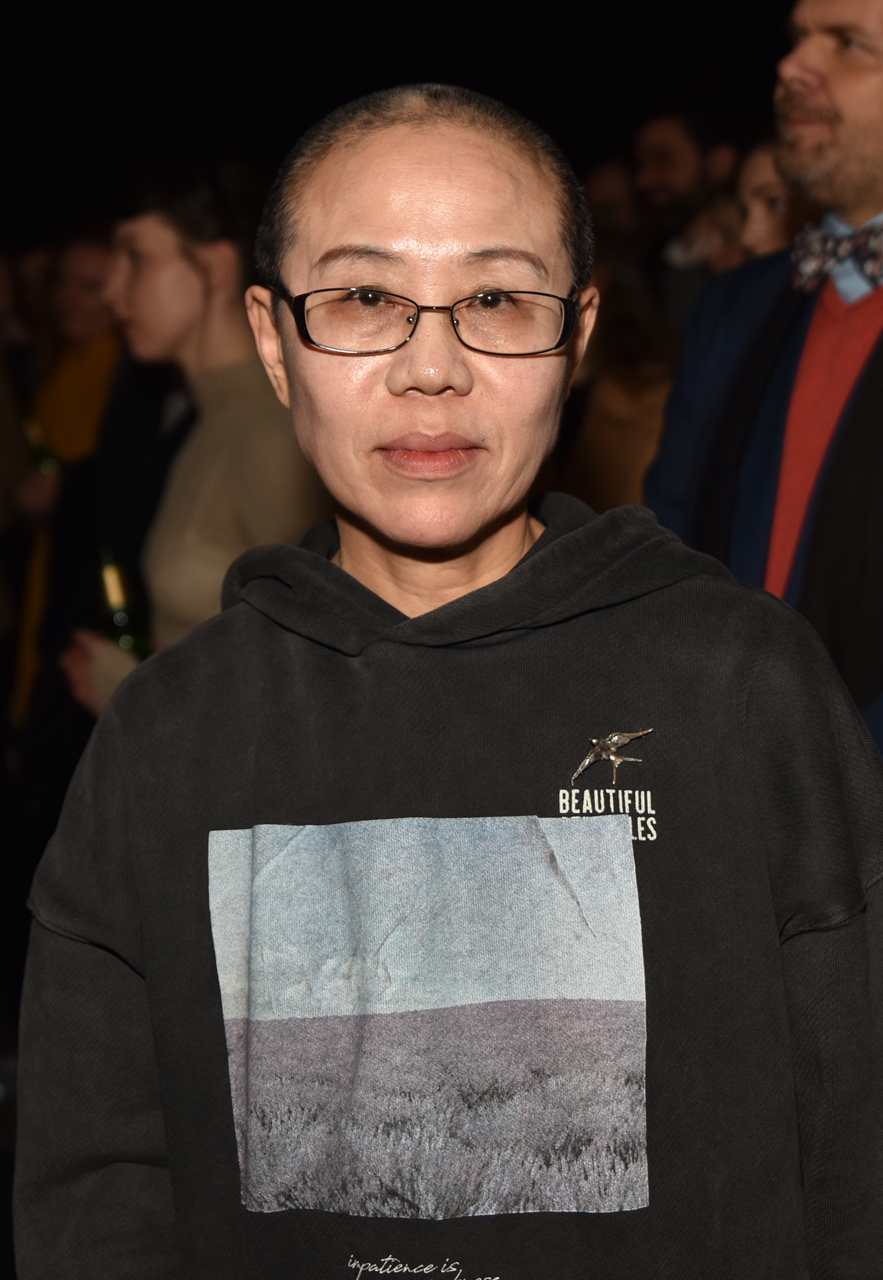
- Liu Xia in 2024
- Born: 1 April 1961 (age 65); Beijing, China
- Occupations: poet, painter, photographer
- Spouse: Liu Xiaobo (m. 1996; died 2017)

Liu Xia
- Simplified Chinese: 刘霞
- Traditional Chinese: 劉霞
Transcriptions
Standard Mandarin
- Hanyu Pinyin: Liú Xiá

Liu Xia (Chinese: 刘霞; born 1 April 1961, Beijing, China) is a Chinese painter, poet, and photographer. Liu Xia was under effective house arrest in China as her husband, Liu Xiaobo, had been awarded the Nobel Peace Prize in 2010. She remained under house arrest until 10 July 2018, when she was allowed to travel to Germany for medical treatment.

== Biography ==
Liu was formerly a civil servant in the Beijing tax bureau, and met her husband Liu Xiaobo while part of the Beijing literary scene in the 1980s. She married Liu Xiaobo while he was imprisoned in China in a labor re-education camp in 1996.

Liu prefers to lead the solitary life of an intellectual. However, being the wife of an oft-imprisoned activist, she has been forced to act as his proxy in the public arena. She has been described as her husband's "most important link to the outside world." Because she is married to one of China's most prominent human rights advocates, she also personally experiences pressures from Chinese authorities for publicly voicing opinions. Since his arrest, she has lived under constant surveillance. From the time of their marriage, during his several terms in prison, she has continued to speak out, although somewhat reluctantly, on issues of human rights both on her own and on his behalf. Despite the pressures, she attempts to retain a life of normality.

Liu Xiaobo's last sentence, of 11 years, was imposed after he helped write the 2008 political manifesto called Charter 08. Liu Xia begged her husband to not participate in drafting the document. After initially heeding her pleas, he went forward anyway, immersing himself for three years drafting and re-drafting the document, which he later persuaded more than 300 prominent workers, Chinese Communist Party members, and intellectuals to sign. The document was later "signed" by 10,000 users on the Internet.

After it was announced that her husband had won the Nobel Peace Prize while he was imprisoned for an 11-year term for calling for multiparty elections in China, Liu Xia commented that “For all these years, Liu Xiaobo has persevered in telling the truth about China and because of this, for the fourth time, he has lost his personal freedom." She also said that she would visit him in jail and "give him a big hug". After visiting him, however, she was placed under house arrest and her mobile number deactivated.

In May 2011, the United Nations Working Group on Arbitrary Detention (WGAD) made a statement declaring that "The deprivation of liberty of Liu Xia, being in contravention to articles 9, 10 and 19 of the Universal Declaration of Human Rights, is arbitrary, and falls within categories II and III of the categories applicable to the cases submitted to the Working Group" and called for an immediate end to the house arrest.

In late 2012, Liu Xia spoke briefly with journalists from The Associated Press who managed to visit her apartment.

A video was later uploaded to YouTube showing another brief, unauthorized visit on 28 December 2012 in which Liu Xia and several persons converse briefly in her home.

On 23 April 2013, she was allowed out to see her brother's trial, which Liu Xia felt was politically motivated. Her brother's lawyers said that the purported dispute had been resolved, but was brought back into court for some reason. Human rights activist Nicholas Bequelin asserted that this trial was therefore an act of attempted intimidation by the government in order to silence Liu Xia even further. During her brief stint out of her house, where she is allowed no internet, no phone, and few visitors, she found a welcoming crowd waiting for her. She shouted to them, "Tell everybody that I'm not free"; "I love you. I miss you."; and she blew kisses.

On 19 November 2013, she filed an appeal for Liu Xiaobo's retrial, a move that's been called "extraordinary" because the action could refocus the world's attention on China's human rights record. According to her attorney, Mo Shaoping, Liu Xia visited her husband in Jinzhou Prison in Liaoning and had gained his approval before filing this motion. In December 2013, a friend of hers, Hu, told BBC that three years of house arrest had thrown Liu into deep depression and a health professional had been prescribing anti-depressant medication for her.

The Silent Strength of Liu Xia is a collection of 25 black-and-white photographs Liu Xia produced between 1996 and 1999 while her husband served his second stint in a labor re-education camp. It is the only exhibition of Liu Xia's photographic work in the United States. French scholar Guy Sorman, a longtime friend of Liu Xia and her husband, transported the prints out of China and curated the exhibition at the Italian Academy for Advanced Studies at Columbia University.

In 2015, a bilingual collection of Liu Xia's poetry, Empty Chairs, was published by Graywolf Press. The poems in the collection span from 1983 to 2013. After her husband's death on 13 July 2017, no one knew her whereabouts for six months, although the Chinese government openly stated that she was "free". On 2 September 2017, she was reported to have returned to her Beijing home. Frank Lu Siqing, the founder of the Hong Kong-based Information Centre for Human Rights and Democracy, successfully spoke to Liu Xia on the phone for half an hour after calling her at her home in Beijing, South China Morning Post reports.

== House arrest after death of Liu Xiaobo ==
Although Liu Xia is not generally seen as a social activist in her own right, unlike her late husband, and has never been accused or convicted of any crime, she has endured house arrest without charges and subject to 24-hour surveillance since 2010, in contravention of Article 39 of the 1982 Constitution of China, which states that "the freedom of movement of any law-abiding Chinese citizen shall not be infringed", as well as Article 252 of the Criminal Prosecution Ordinance, which states that "any act of violating the freedom of communication of any law-abiding Chinese citizen is strictly prohibited". She is denied access to a phone or a computer.

Since Liu's sea burial, neither Liu Xia nor her brother has been seen amidst reports that she had been forced to go on vacation in the southern province of Yunnan, so that she would not attend a memorial for her husband on the seventh day following his death, which had been held by various people abroad. Liu's friends in mainland China were reportedly subjected to house arrest as they prepared for a memorial – some were detained after staging ceremonies at the seaside at Dalian. Media have reported that the area in which Liu Xia's residence is situated is under heavy guard by plainclothes officials, who threaten and manhandle journalists. Although NGOs, a number of foreign leaders, notably Angela Merkel, as well as British foreign secretary Boris Johnson have spoken out for Liu and her husband, urging the lifting of all restrictions on Liu Xia after her husband's death. On the other hand, Chinese officials state that Liu Xia is in fact free, contrary to reports by Western media and Liu's claim.

Jerome Cohen, a professor at New York University and an expert in Chinese law and human rights, said he believed the rulers of one-party China would be reluctant to release Liu Xia in case she became a figurehead of resistance. Cohen also argued that "not only should foreign governments condemn China for its violations of human rights that led to Liu Xiaobo's imprisonment and death, but they should also press the Chinese government to give Liu Xia, who has been put under severe illegal house arrest for the past seven years, the option to leave China. If she chooses to remain in China, the Chinese government should, in accordance with its international human rights obligations, immediately lift all the oppressive conditions that she has suffered".

UN High Commissioner for Human Rights Zeid Ra'ad Al Hussein announced at the United Nations headquarters on 20 July 2017 that he would meet with Chinese officials to push for assurances that Liu Xia would be allowed to leave China, countering Chinese claims that raising human rights concerns amounted to interference in domestic affairs.

On 25 July 2017, U.S. Senator Marco Rubio penned an open letter to Liu Xia, "Current U.S. law gives the President of the United States the authority to impose visa bans and to freeze the assets of any foreign citizens who suppress basic human rights; surely the Chinese government's treatment of you and your husband meets this standard." As chair of the Congressional-Executive Commission on China, Rubio also requested U.S. Ambassador to China Terry Branstad to meet with Liu Xia either at the U.S. embassy or her place of residence to understand her current situation and long-term wishes.

== Photo gallery ==
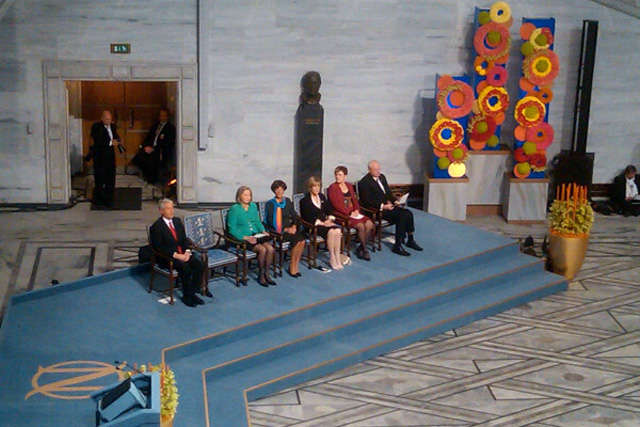
The Nobel Peace Prize 2010 ceremony: empty chair on the stage booked for Liu Xiaobo, who was in prison at that time; Chinese government also didn't allow Liu Xia travel to Oslo, putting her under house arrest.

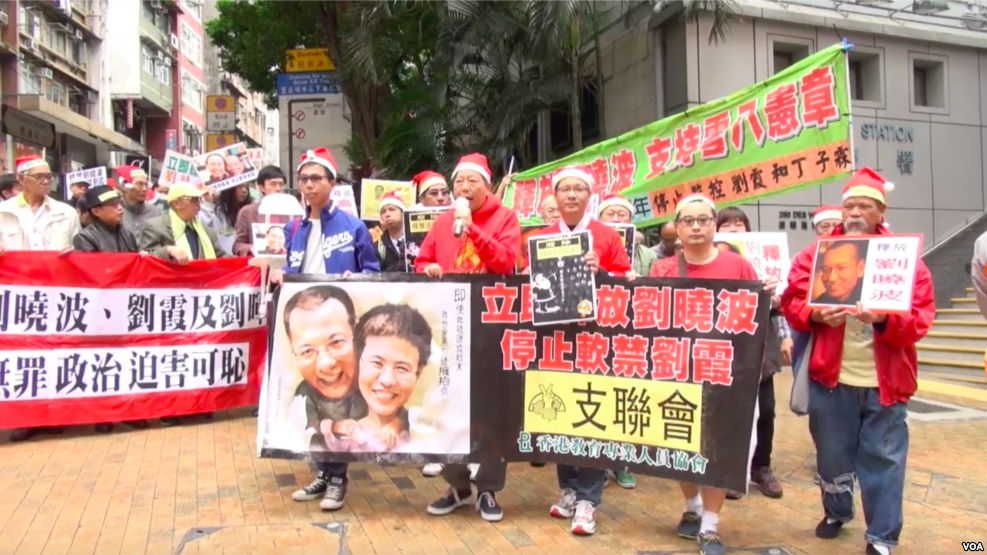
Hong Kong Christmas Parade near the Liaison Office demanding the release of Liu Xiaobo. Photograph: 5 February 2017

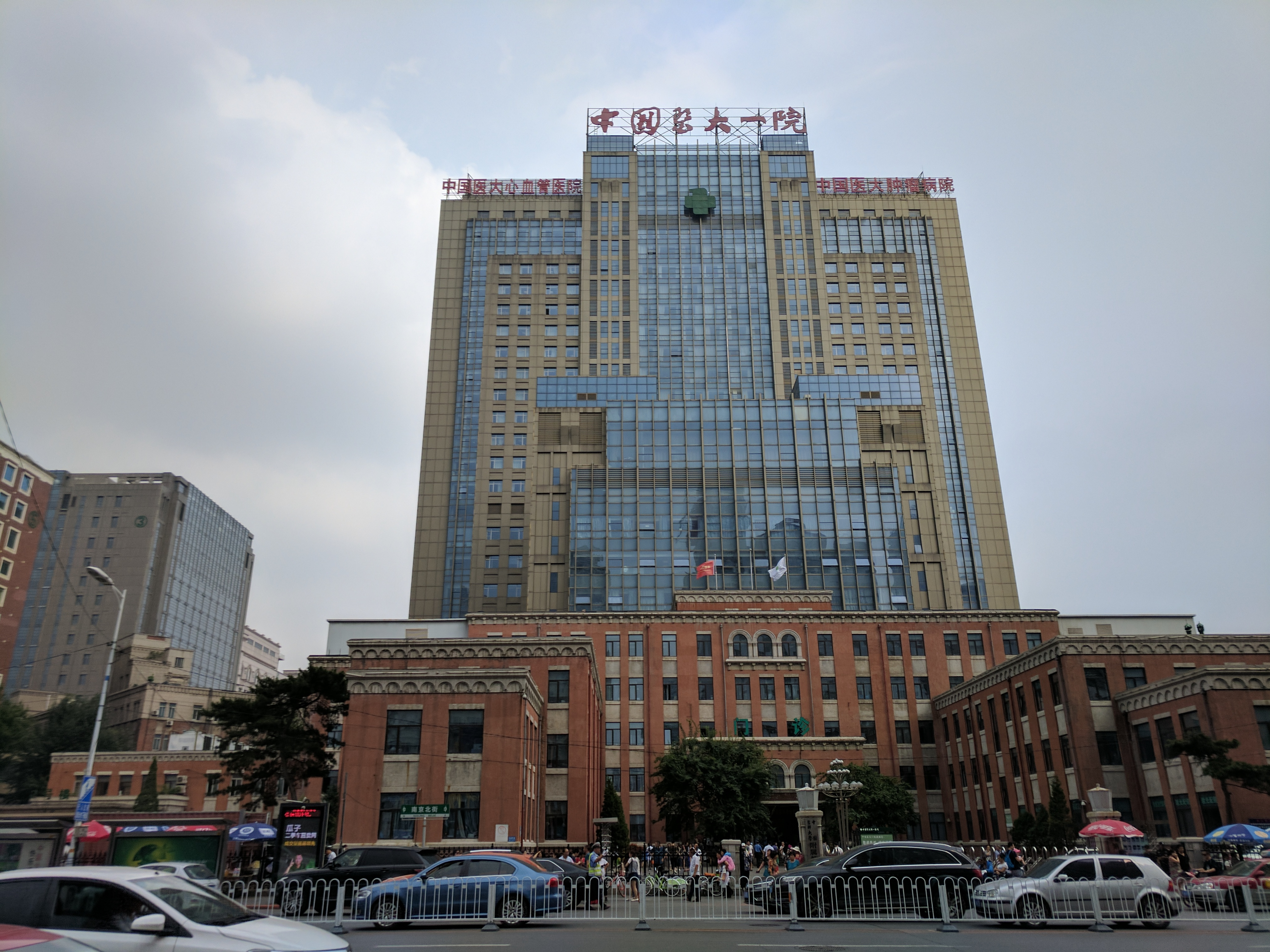
First hospital of China Medical University in the northeastern city of Shenyang where Liu Xiaobo died on 13 July 2017. Photograph: 14 July 2017

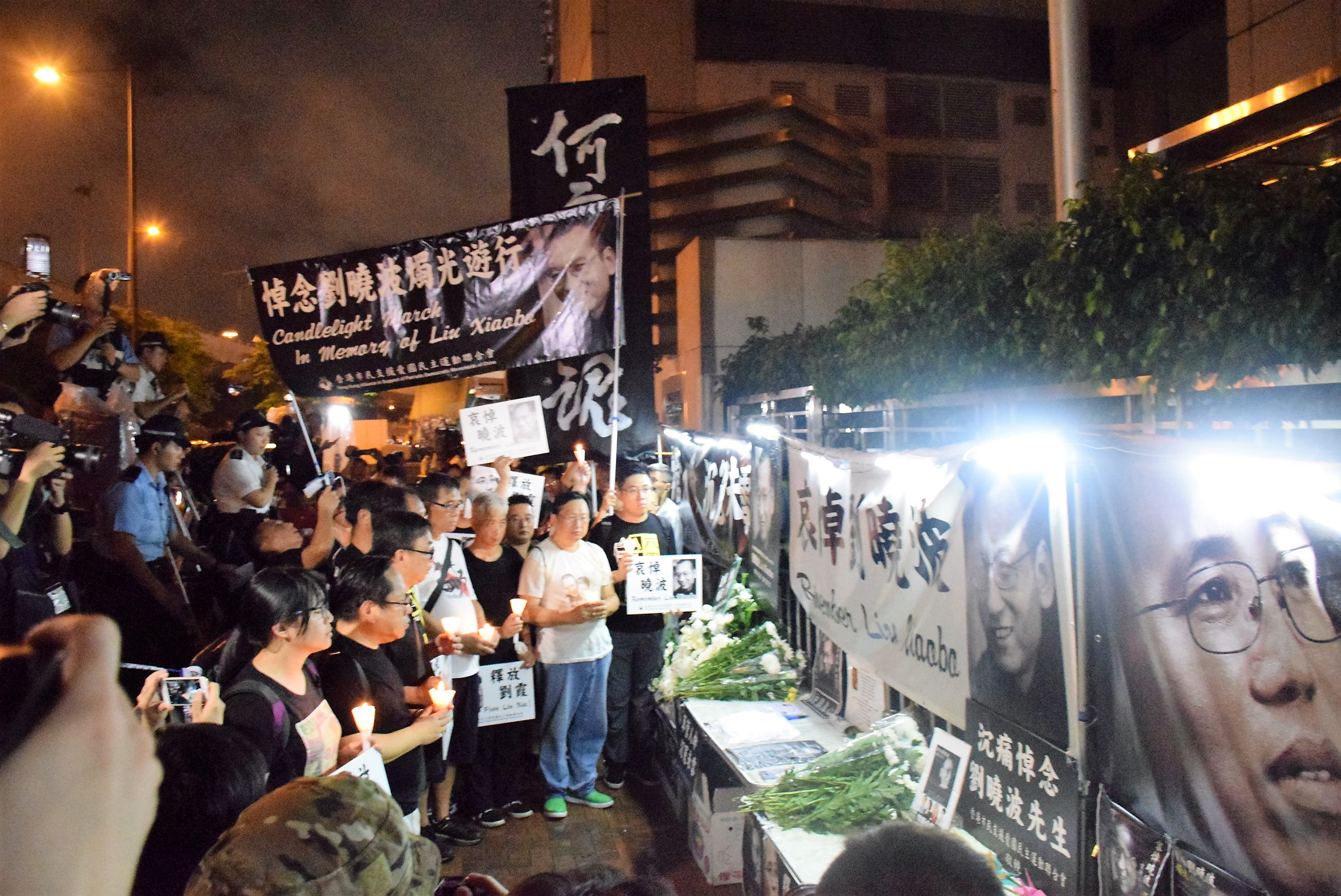
Citizens of Hong Kong gathered to remember Liu Xiaobo who died on 13 July 2017. Photograph: 17 July 2017

== Move to Germany ==
After Liu Xiaobo's ocean burial, Liu Xia, — as said her friend Liao Yiwu, Chinese poet and dissident living in exile in Germany, — had lived a while in Dali City in Yunnan province together with her younger brother Liu Hui, and when Liu Xia's friends and family had said that she returned to Beijing on 4 August 2017, German and US diplomats tried to visit her flat but were stopped by guards. German embassy diplomats said they would try to push the Chinese government to grant freedom of movement for Liu Xia, although Chinese officials said that Liu Xia was free and could move according to the Chinese law.

In May 2018, Liao Yiwu reported with Liu Xia's permission that she was suffering debilitating clinical depression, after the Beijing government had broken multiple promises that she would 'soon' be free to travel, including, in early April 2018, an arrangement made by Heiko Maas, the German Foreign Minister, to facilitate her travel to Germany.

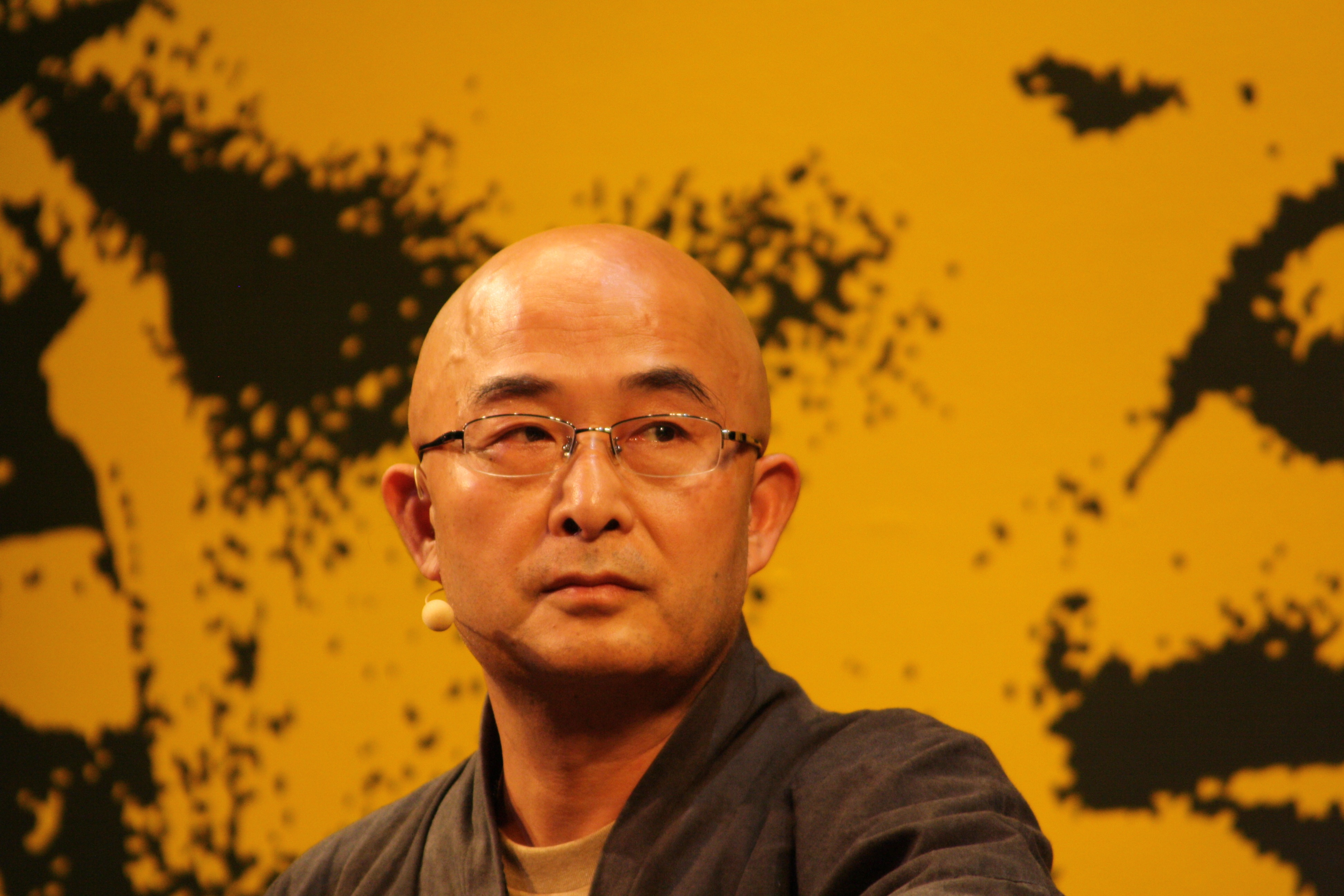
Chinese writer, oral historian, folk musician, Liao Yiwu

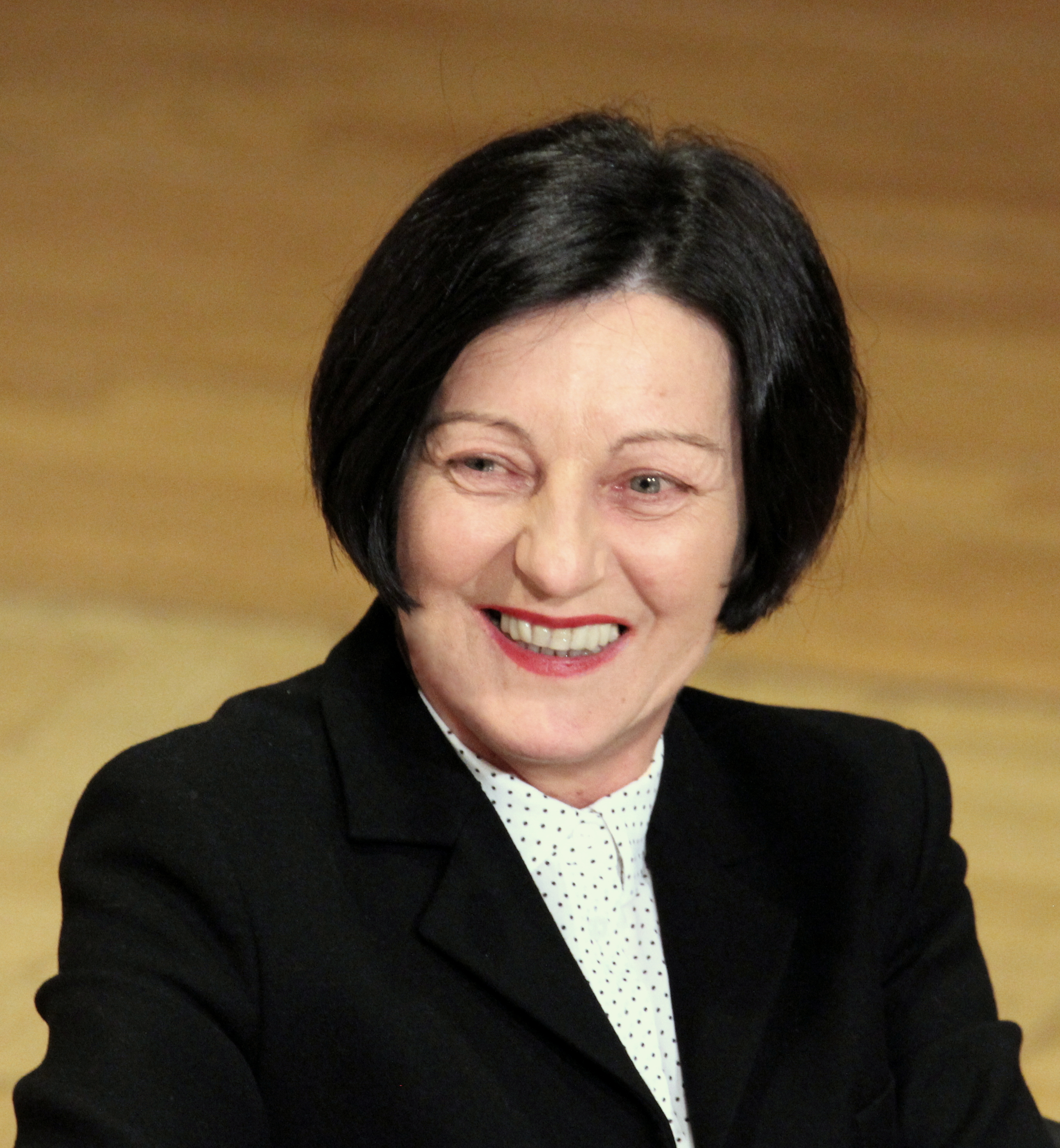
German writer Herta Müller won the Nobel Prize for literature in 2009 for story of hard life in authoritarian Romania during communist rule.

Liao Yiwu spoke with Liu Xia on telephone on 8 April 2018 and they agreed that she would try to write an application at the German Embassy, but she cried, bursting into tears, that she had neither a computer nor smartphone to do it. At the same time, Liao Yiwu promised her that he would try to pressure German politicians with the help of Nobel laureate Herta Müller and other artists and writers in Berlin. Liao Yiwu again called Liu Xia on 30 April 2018 and asked for permission to publish their 8 April 2018 telephone record with her desperate cries to pressure politicians and society to help her leave China.

Liu Xia left China and flew to Germany for medical treatment on 10 July 2018. The same day, her younger brother, Liu Hui, remaining in China, wrote in social media WeChat, that Liu Xia flew to Europe to start her new life there, and that he was grateful to all who were helping Liu Xia these past years. Liu Hui was sentenced to 11 years in prison on fraud charges in 2013, but released in 2015 on bail with stringent conditions. Chinese human rights activist Hu Jia said that Liu Hui, by remaining in China, was used as a hostage. Liu Xia has long insisted that her younger brother should leave China with her, due to fears that Liu Hui would be used in China to limit her freedom of speech abroad.
