= Perry Link =

American sinologist (born 1944)

- 林培瑞
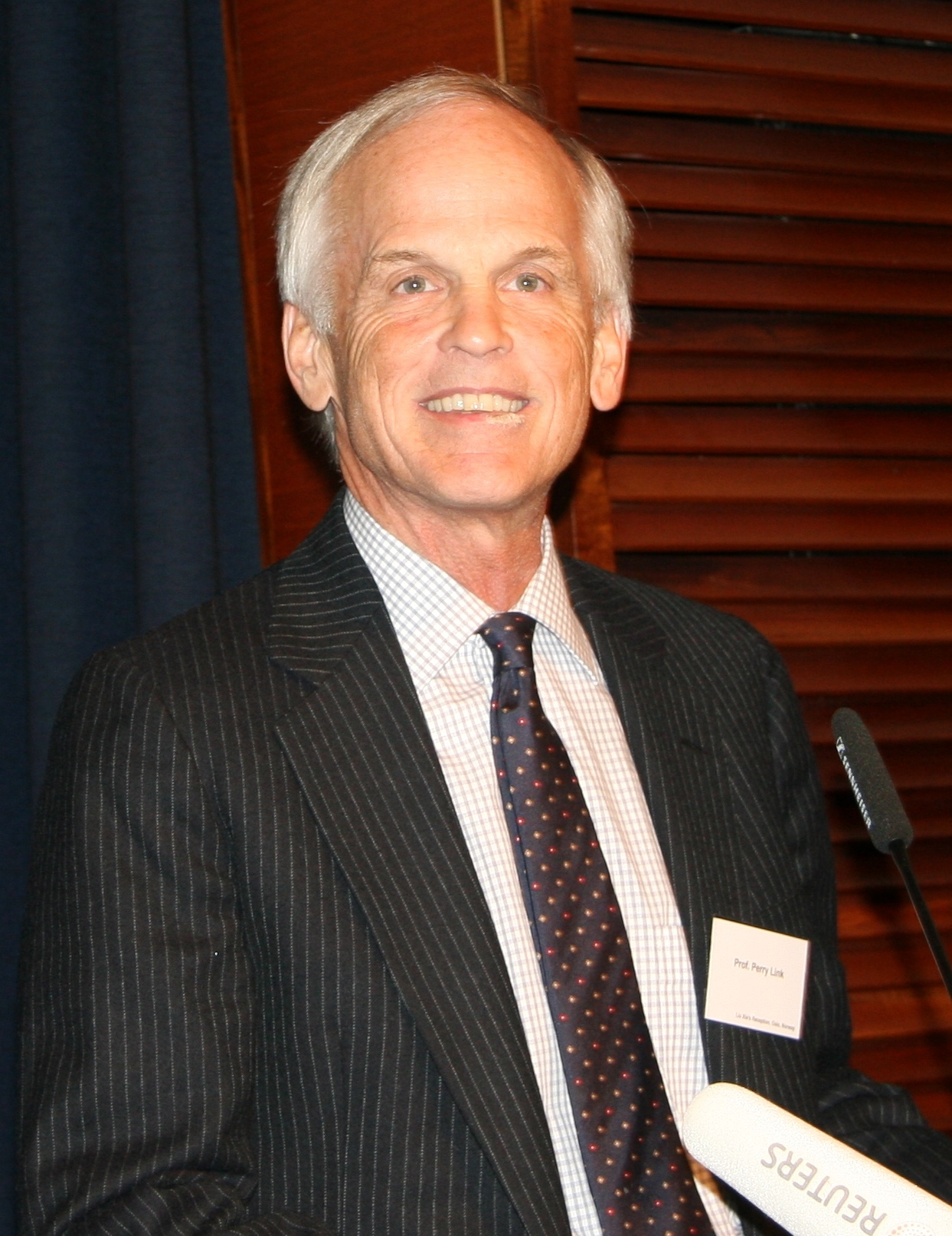
- Link in 2010
- Born: Eugene Perry Link Jr. 6 August 1944 (age 82); Gaffney, South Carolina, U.S.
- Education: Harvard University
- Scientific career
- Thesis: The rise of modern popular fiction in Shanghai (1976)

Chinese name
- Chinese: 林培瑞
Transcriptions
Standard Mandarin
- Hanyu Pinyin: Lín Péiruì
- Wade–Giles: Lin^{2} P'ei^{2}-jui^{4}

Eugene Perry Link, Jr. (Chinese: 林培瑞; pinyin: Lín Péiruì; born 6 August 1944) is Chancellorial Chair Professor for Innovative Teaching Comparative Literature and Foreign Languages in the College of Humanities, Arts, and Social Sciences at the University of California, Riverside, and Emeritus Professor of East Asian Studies at Princeton University. He has published studies of modern Chinese literature, Chinese language, and introductory language texts and is known for supporting Chinese dissidents and democracy activists.

Link taught Chinese language and literature at Princeton University (1973–77 and 1989-2008) and UCLA (1977-1988). Link has been a board member of the Committee for Freedom in Hong Kong (CFHK) since 2021. CFHK is a US-based non-profit organisation that presses for the preservation of freedom, democracy, and international law in Hong Kong.

== Life ==
Link received his B.A. in philosophy from Harvard University in 1966 and his Ph.D. in 1976. The University of California Press published his PhD thesis as Mandarin Ducks and Butterflies: Popular Fiction in Early Twentieth-Century Chinese Cities (1981). The Mandarin Ducks and Butterflies novels had been neglected by most scholars because they appealed to the broad middle-class public rather than to elite readers. The scholar Milena Doleželová-Velingerová, writing in an extensive review article, praised Link for his "ambitious project" to "place China's popular fiction of the 1910s and 1920s in a context of literary history," showing that popular fiction of the May Fourth era was worthy of attention.

Link has translated many Chinese stories, writings, and poems into English. Along with Andrew J. Nathan, he translated the Tiananmen Papers, which detailed the governmental response to the 1989 democracy protests. In 1996, China blacklisted Link, and he has been denied entrance ever since. In 2001, Link was detained and questioned upon arriving in Hong Kong because of his involvement in the Tiananmen Papers. After roughly one hour, he was allowed to enter Hong Kong, where he spoke at the Hong Kong Foreign Correspondents Club. He has been banned from the People's Republic of China since, however.

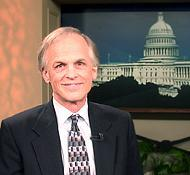
Link in 2006

Following the crackdown on the 1989 Tiananmen Square protests, Link helped Chinese dissident Fang Lizhi and Fang's wife obtain refuge at the U.S. Embassy. Fang remained at the embassy for a year until negotiations resulted in Fang's being allowed to leave and settle in the U.S.

Link gathered short publications in the anthology, The Anaconda in the Chandelier: Writings on China, published in 2025. Jeffrey Kinkley wrote that these pieces presented the facets of Link's "academic dynamism and dogged activism" along with "several shared motivations and traits: love of the Chinese language in all its forms, written and spoken; admiration of Chinese popular culture and the enduring grassroots social, moral, and ethical values it embodies..."

== Controversy ==
From 2022 to 2024, Link faced disciplinary action at U.C. Riverside after expressing concerns in a faculty search committee about prioritizing a Black candidate’s race over qualifications. Link was removed from the search committee and subjected to a disciplinary process, including hearings resembling a trial, where termination was suggested as a penalty. Link said his comments were intended to caution against elevating race as the “overriding criterion” and that the comments were reported to the university without his knowledge. Although a faculty committee unanimously found that Link did not violate any conduct codes, UC Riverside chancellor Kim Wilcox issued Link a formal letter of censure.

The university recommended that Link keep the process confidential and warned that the disclosure of any details of his disciplinary process “may result in discipline.” In December 2024, Link went public about his experience in an op-ed published in the Wall Street Journal.

== Selected publications ==
=== Books ===
- Mandarin Ducks and Butterflies: Popular Fiction in Early Twentieth-Century Chinese Cities (University of California Press, 1981).
- Evening Chats in Beijing (W.W. Norton, 1994), (Princeton University Press, 2000).
- Banyang suibi 半洋隨筆 (Notes of a Semi-Foreigner; in Chinese) (Taipei: Sanminchubanshe, 1999).
- The Uses of Literature: Life in the Socialist Chinese Literary System (Princeton University Press, 2000). ISBN 0691227845.
- An Anatomy of Chinese: Rhythm, Metaphor, Politics (Harvard University Press, 2013).
- I Have No Enemies: The Life and Legacy of Liu Xiaobo with Wu Dazhi (Columbia University Press, 2023)
- The Anaconda in the Chandelier: Writings on China (Paul Dry Books, 2025). ISBN 978-1589881983.

=== Articles and chapters ===
- Link, Perry (22 June 2011), "My Disilusionment: China 1973", New York Review
- Link, Perry (1993), "Ideology and Theory in the Study of Modern Chinese Literature: An Introduction", Modern China, 19 (1): 4–12, doi:10.1177/009770049301900102, JSTOR 189326. Accessed 17 Dec. 2024.

=== Edited volumes ===
- Stubborn Weeds: Popular and Controversial Chinese Literature after the Cultural Revolution. (Bloomington: Indiana University Press, Chinese Literature in Translation, 1983). ISBN 0253355125.
- Roses and Thorns: The Second Blooming of the Hundred Flowers in Chinese Fiction, 1979-80. (Berkeley: University of California Press, 1984). ISBN 0520049799
- with Richard Madsen and Paul Pickowicz, Unofficial China : Popular Culture and Thought in the People's Republic. (Boulder: Westview Press, 1989). ISBN 0813309239.
- with Liang Zhang, Andrew J. Nathan, The Tiananmen Papers. (New York: Public Affairs, 2001). ISBN 158648012X.
- Link, Perry (2014). "'Jaw Laoshy' and Teaching Chinese". CHINOPERL. 33 (2): 158–179. doi:10.1179/0193777414Z.00000000025.

=== Translations ===
- Charter 08 manifesto (January 2009).
- Fang Lizhi, The Most Wanted Man In China: My Journey from Scientist to Enemy of the State (Henry Holt, 2015).
- Liu Xiaobo, No Enemies, No Hatred: Selected Essays and Poems (Harvard University Press, 2013).

=== Teaching material ===
- Chinese Primer. Princeton University Press (Princeton, NJ), 1994. Issued in Pinyin and GR editions.
- Oh, China! Elementary Reader of Modern Chinese for Advanced Beginners, Princeton University Press (Princeton, NJ), 1997.

== Further readings ==
- Encyclopedia.Com (ed.). "LINK, (Eugene) Perry, (Jr.) 1944-". Contemporary Authors, New Revision Series.
- Eugene P. Link Papers, 1907-1993. M.E. Grenander Department of Special Collections and Archives, University Libraries, University at Albany, State University of New York
