= Mo Shaoping =

Mo Shaoping (Chinese: 莫少平) is a Chinese lawyer who represented the imprisoned journalist Shi Tao, after the lawyer Guo Guoting. He also was a defense lawyer on the case of Liu Xiaobo.

The founder of Beijing Mo Shaoping Law Firm, Mo Shaoping is also a member of the Human Rights and Constitutional Law Committee of the All China Lawyers Association. Specialized in criminal law, he and his cohort are known internationally for many politically sensitive cases, including that of Liu Xiaobo. He also represented Liu Xiaobing's wife, Liu Xia, who had been held under house arrest with no access to Internet and nearly no visitors.

== See also ==
- Human rights in the People's Republic of China
