= I Have No Enemies =

Essay by Nobel Laureate and Chinese dissident Liu Xiaobo

"I have no enemies: My final Statement" (Chinese: 我没有敌人──我的最后陈述) was an essay written by Liu Xiaobo, a Chinese dissident and Nobel Peace Prize laureate, intended to be read at his trial in December 2009.

Liu was charged with the crime of "inciting subversion of state power". He came before the court in Beijing, China on 23 December 2009, and was sentenced to an 11-year imprisonment on 25 December.

I have no enemies, and no hatred. None of the police who have monitored, arrested and interrogated me, the prosecutors who prosecuted me, or the judges who sentence me, are my enemies. While I’m unable to accept your surveillance, arrest, prosecution or sentencing, I respect your professions and personalities, including Zhang Rongge and Pan Xueqing who act for the prosecution at present. I was aware of your respect and sincerity in your interrogation of me on December 3.

For hatred is corrosive of a person’s wisdom and conscience; the mentality of enmity can poison a nation’s spirit, instigate brutal life and death struggles, destroy a society’s tolerance and humanity, and block a nation’s progress to freedom and democracy. I hope therefore to be able to transcend my personal vicissitudes in understanding the development of the state and changes in society, to counter the hostility of the regime with the best of intentions, and defuse hate with love....

I do not feel guilty for following my constitutional right to freedom of expression, for fulfilling my social responsibility as a Chinese citizen. Even if accused of it, I would have no complaints.

— Liu Xiaobo, 23 December 2009

Although Liu was never allowed to be heard during his trial, the essay was later published and was well received. It became the laureate's speech delivered by Liv Ullmann at the award ceremony for the 2010 Nobel Peace Prize ceremony on 10 December 2010.
