= Liao Yiwu =

Chinese musician and writer (born 1958)

- 廖亦武
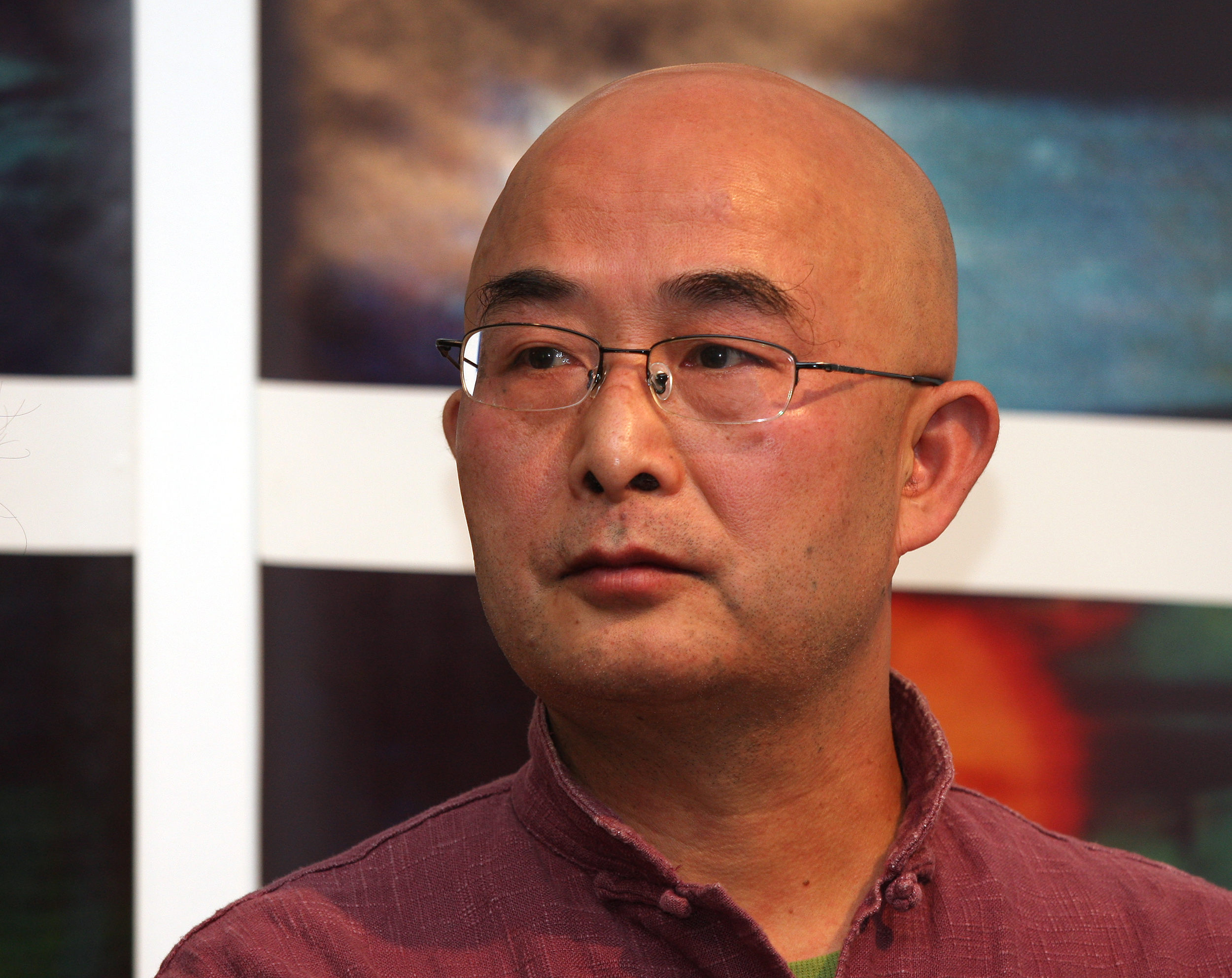
- Liao Yiwu 2010
- Born: 16 June 1958 (age 68); Yanting County, Sichuan, China
- Occupations: Author; reporter; poet; musician
- Writing career
- Pen name: Lao Wei (老威)
- Notable awards: Hellman-Hammett Grant; Geschwister-Scholl-Preis; Ryszard Kapuściński Award

Liao Yiwu (Chinese: 廖亦武; pinyin: Liào Yìwǔ; also known as Lao Wei (Chinese: 老威); born 16 June 1958) is a Chinese author, reporter, musician, and poet. He is a critic of China's Communist Party, for which he was imprisoned in 1990. His books, several of which are collections of interviews with ordinary people from the lower rungs of Chinese society, were published in Taiwan and Hong Kong but are banned in mainland China; some have been translated into Spanish, English, French, German, Polish and Czech. He has been living in Germany since April 2011.

== Early life and education ==
Liao Yiwu was born in 1958, the same year as The Great Leap Forward. During the famine of The Great Leap Forward, he suffered from edema and was close to dying. In 1966, his father was branded a counter-revolutionary during the Chinese Cultural Revolution. Liao's parents filed for divorce to protect the children. His mother was arrested for attempting to sell government issued coupons on the black market.

After high school, Liao traveled around the country. In his spare time he read banned Western poets such as John Keats and Charles Baudelaire. He started composing his own poems which were published in literary magazines. He failed the university entrance exams and began to work for a newspaper. When his poetry was noticed, the Chinese Ministry of Culture gave him a paid position as state writer.

== Career ==
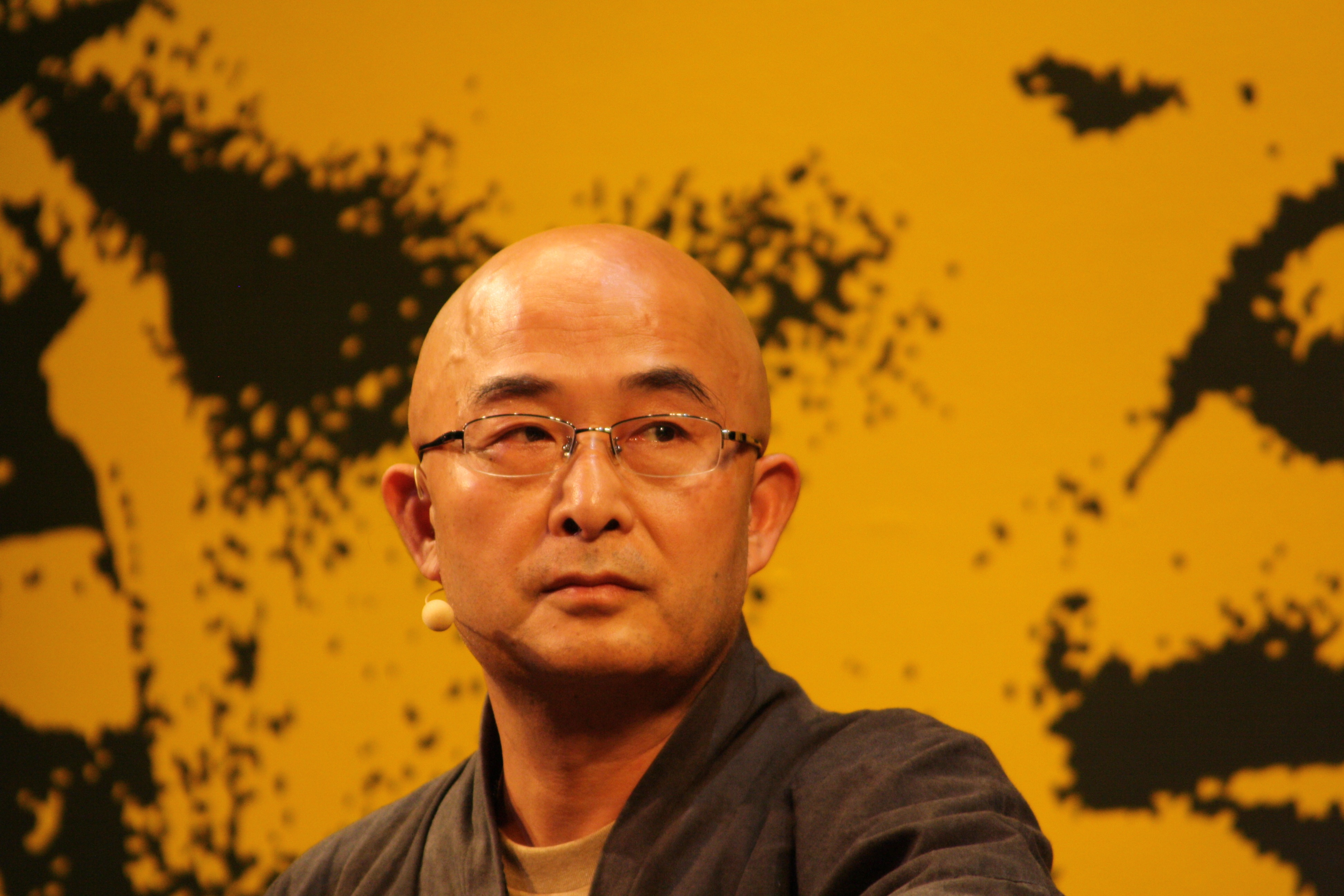
Liao Yiwu at the Erlangen poetry festival 2011

In the spring of 1989, two magazine companies took advantage of the relaxed politics and carried Liao's long poems "The Yellow City" and "Idol." In these poems, Liao Yiwu criticized the political system, calling it paralyzed and eaten away by a collective leukemia. The poems were deemed anti-communist and he was questioned and detained and his home was searched.

In June 1989, after hearing about the Tiananmen Square protests, Liao composed a long poem entitled "Massacre." Knowing that it would never be published, he made an audiotape and recited the poem by using Chinese ritualistic chanting and howling, invoking the spirits of the dead. Liao and friends made a movie, the sequel of Massacre, "Requiem."

In February 1990, Liao Yiwu was arrested as he was boarding a train. Six friends and his pregnant wife were arrested separately. Liao received a four-year sentence and was placed on the government's permanent blacklist. While in prison, due to torture and abusive punishment, he suffered several mental breakdowns and twice attempted suicide. He was known as "the big lunatic." From a fellow prisoner, an elderly monk, he learned to play the Xiao. He then began to interview other prisoners about their lives.

When he was released from prison, his wife and their daughter left him, and his former literary friends kept their distance. He lived for a while as a homeless street musician in Chengdu, collecting stories. From 2003 to 2009, he lived in Lijiang, where he opened a music bar, and then Dali.

In 1998, he compiled The Fall of the Holy Temple, an anthology of underground poems from the 1970s, mainly from Chinese dissidents. One of China's vice premiers called it a "premeditated attempt to overthrow the government, and [claimed it was] supported by powerful anti-China groups."

In 2001, his multi-volume Interviews with People from the Bottom Rung of Society was published in Taiwan. The book consists of transcribed interviews with people on the margins of Chinese society, from "hustlers to drifters, outlaws and street performers, the officially renegade and the physically handicapped, those who deal with human waste and with the wasting of humans, artists and shamans, crooks, even cannibals." Although it is currently banned in China, the book is easily found on Chinese file sharing websites. He was arrested several times for conducting "illegal interviews" and for exposing the dark side of the Communist Party. A French translation of some of these interviews appeared in 2003, an English translation was published under the name The Corpse Walker in 2008 and a German translation appeared in 2009.

In 2008 he signed the Charter 08 of his friend Liu Xiaobo, although he says of himself that he is not really interested in politics, just in his stories.

In May 2008, after the Sichuan earthquake, Liao went to the disaster region and interviewed survivors fighting corrupt officials. This material was published as Chronicles of the Big Earthquake in Hong Kong in 2009. The French translation Quand la terre s'est ouverte au Sichuan : Journal d'une tragédie appeared in 2010.

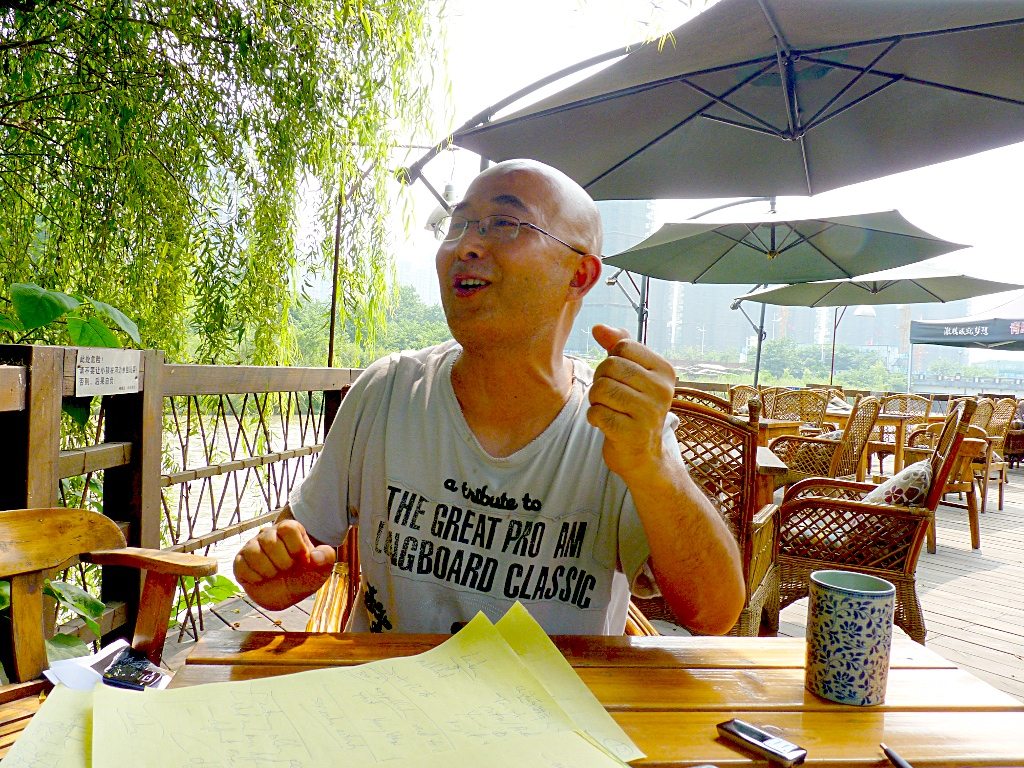
Liao Yiwu in Chengdu, July 2010

In February 2010, he wrote an open letter to Chancellor of Germany Angela Merkel after having been denied permission to leave the country many times. Later that year he was allowed to leave the country for the first time. He visited Germany accepting invitations to literary festivals in Hamburg and Berlin as well as to an event in Cologne. He held numerous readings and gave interviews. On stage, he sang songs, played the flute and drank hard liquor.

In June 2010, the Berlin International Literature Festival held a worldwide reading for Liao Yiwu in order to commemorate the massacre of Tiananmen Square, and to admonish China's human rights record. In March 2011, the Chinese police threatened him that if he were to publish any more he would be disappeared.

Prior to his departure from China, he lived under police surveillance with his wife in Chengdu, supporting himself with the royalties from his books published abroad.

Liao Yiwu in an email dated April 1, 2011, wrote:

Friends:

I originally planned to leave for the United States on April 4 in order to make a publicity tour for my book God is Red which will be published in English translation by Harper Collins and for my book The Corpse Walker which was published by Random House.

Unexpectedly, on March 28th, the police issued an order forbidding me to leave China.

I had originally planned to travel to San Francisco, Chicago, Boston, New York, Washington and other cities and to give lectures, readings and musical performances at Harvard, Yale and other universities as well as participate in the New York Literary Festival where I was to make a speech and perform, and to have a dialogue with writers from around the world on the theme "Contemporary Writer and Bearing Witness to History". Now all this has been canceled.

My new book is also going to be published in Australia. My plan to travel from the United States to Australia has also been canceled.

Ever since my return from Germany last year, I have been closely monitored. The police have "invited me to drink tea" many times. My writing has been repeatedly interrupted.

I have once again been forbidden to travel abroad for national security reasons.

Over the last ten or so years I have strived to get the right to travel abroad 16 times. I succeeded once and failed 15 times.

Thank you all for your concern for me over the years.

Liao Yiwu

=== Arrival in Germany ===
On July 6, 2011, Liao arrived in Germany having left China overland by crossing the border with Vietnam.

== Views ==
In an interview with French media, Liao called for the Balkanization of China into 20 or more states, arguing that Chinese culture was at its height during eras of fragmentation, such as the Spring and Autumn period and Warring States period, producing culturally influential philosophers such as Confucius and Laozi.

== Awards ==
- In 2003, he was awarded a Human Rights Watch Hellman-Hammett Grant.
- In 2007, he received a Freedom to Write Award from the Independent Chinese PEN Center. Authorities prevented him from attending the award ceremony in Beijing.
- In 2011 he was awarded the German Geschwister-Scholl-Preis.
- In 2012 he received the Ryszard Kapuściński Award
- In 2012 he received the Peace Prize of the German Book Trade. In his address at the prize ceremony in the Paulskirche, Liao Yiwu described China as "the source of global disasters" and an "ever-expanding garbage dump". He concluded his speech with the wish that "for the peaceful well-being of all humanity, this empire (China) must break apart".

== List of works ==
Books

- The Fall of the Holy Temple (1998)
- Report on China's Victims of Injustice
- Testimonials (證詞), German translation published by Fischer in June 2011 (by the title of Für ein Lied und hundert Lieder. Ein Zeugenbericht aus chinesischen Gefängnissen). It describes the horrific treatment of Liao Yiwu and other political prisoners in a Chongqing prison who were arrested after the June 4, 1989, crackdown.
- Interviews with the Lower Strata of Chinese Society 中國底層訪談錄 2 volumes, Changjiang Publishing House, China (banned by the Chinese Communist Party Propaganda Department and the PRC Government's Publications Office)
- Interviews with the Lower Strata of Chinese Society 中國底層訪談錄 3 volumes, Maitian Publishing House of Taiwan 台灣麥田出版社.(2001)
  - L'Empire des bas-fonds French translation of some of these interviews, 2003
  - The Corpse Walker: Real Life Stories: China from the Bottom Up, hardcover: Pantheon (April 15, 2008), 336 pages, ISBN 978-0-375-42542-4; trade paperback: Anchor; Reprint edition (May 5, 2009) 352 pages, ISBN 978-0-307-38837-7 English translation of 27 interviews.
  - Fräulein Hallo und der Bauernkaiser, German translation, 2009
- China's Unjust Court Cases 中國冤案錄 Volume 1, Laogai Foundation, 2003, Washington, D.C. (www.laogai.org) Black Literary Treasury, Edited by Liao Tianqi.
- China's Petitioner Villages 中國上访村 Mirror Publishing Co., 2005, US
- China's Unjust Court Cases 中國冤案錄 Volume 2, Laogai Foundation, Washington, 2005 D.C. Black Literary Treasury, Edited by Liao Tianqi.
- The Last of China's Landlords 最後的地主 (two volumes) printed in Hong Kong, published by The Laogai Research Foundation, Washington D.C. April 2008. Website www.laogai.org ISBN 978-1-931550-19-2
- Earthquake Insane Asylum 地震瘋人院 in Taiwan 2009; Chronicles of the Big Earthquake in Hong Kong in 2009. French translation Quand la terre s’est ouverte au Sichuan : Journal d’une tragédie in 2010.
- Shepherds of the Far East 遠東牧羊 April 2011 in the U.S. and its English translation
- God is Red Chinese 地震瘋人院 in Taiwan 2009; French edition 2010, HarperCollins August 2011. collects accounts of the persecution of Christians in China since 1949
- My Witness in German translation June 2011, which discusses the experiences of Liao Yiwu and other political prisoners in a Chongqing prison in the early 1990s.
- For a Song and a Hundred Songs: A Poet's Journey Through a Chinese Prison (2013)
- In English, 'Love Songs from the Gulag' (Barque Press, 2018)
- Bullets and Opium: Stories of China after the Great Massacre (Simon and Schuster: 2019)
- Wuhan in German translation 2022 ISBN 978-3103971057

Poems

- "The Yellow City" (1989)
- "Idol" (1989)
- "Massacre" (1989)

== See also ==
- Liu Xiaobo

== External links and further reading ==
- Michael Day's collection of articles on and translation of the poetry of Liao Yiwu of the 1980s and early 1990s
- Liao Yiwu 廖亦武 selected poetry translations, translations by Michael M. Day of selected poems by Liao Yiwu 1984 - 1994
- China's Second World of Poetry: The Sichuan Avant-Garde, 1982-1992, Michael M. Day's ebook on the Sichuan poetry scene from which Liao Yiwu emerged
- The Public Toilet Manager, interview by Liao Yiwu, The Paris Review, Summer 2005
- The Leper and the Corpse Walkers, interview by Liao Yiwu, The Paris Review, Winter 2006
- The Peasant Emperor and the Retired Official, interview by Liao Yiwu, The Paris Review, Winter 2007
- My Enemies, My Teachers by Liao Yiwu, The Paris Review, Winter 2007. Planned acceptance speech for the Freedom to Write award.
- The Survivor, interview by Liao Yiwu, The Paris Review, Summer 2008
- Nineteen Days by Liao Yiwu, The Paris Review, Summer 2009. Commemoration of the 20th anniversary of the Tiananmen massacre.
- Dangerous Words by Brian Awehali, LOUDCANARY, Spring 2011. In-depth profile of Liao Yiwu based on a series of in-person interviews conducted in 2010.
- "Walking Out on China" opinion by Liao Yiwu in The New York Times September 14, 2011
- Writer as a Recording Device: Interview with Liao Yiwu by Christen Cornell at Artspace China, 29 November 2011
