= Liu Xiaobo =

Chinese human rights activist (1955–2017)

- 刘晓波
- Liu in 2010
- Born: 28 December 1955; Changchun, Jilin, China
- Died: 13 July 2017 (aged 61); Shenyang, Liaoning, China
- Education: Jilin University (BA); Beijing Normal University (MA, PhD)
- Occupations: Writer; political commentator; human rights activist
- Spouses: Tao Li (m. 1982; div. 1989) Liu Xia (m. 1996)
- Children: 1
- Awards: 2010 Nobel Peace Prize

Chinese name
- Simplified Chinese: 刘晓波
- Traditional Chinese: 劉曉波
Transcriptions
Standard Mandarin
- Hanyu Pinyin: Liú Xiǎobō
- Wade–Giles: Liu^{2} Hsiao^{3}-po^{1}
- IPA: [ljǒʊ ɕjàʊ.pwó]

Liu Xiaobo (Chinese: 刘晓波; pinyin: Liú Xiǎobō; 28 December 1955 – 13 July 2017) was a Chinese literary critic, human rights activist, philosopher and Nobel Peace Prize laureate who called for political reforms and was involved in campaigns to end Chinese Communist Party one-party rule in China. He was arrested numerous times, and was described as China's most prominent dissident and the country's most famous political prisoner. On 26 June 2017, he was granted medical parole after being diagnosed with liver cancer; he died a few weeks later on 13 July 2017.

Liu rose to fame in 1980s Chinese literary circles with his literary critiques. He eventually became a visiting scholar at several international universities. He returned to China to support the 1989 Tiananmen Square protests and was imprisoned for the first time from 1989 to 1991, again from 1995 to 1996 and yet again from 1996 to 1999 for his involvement on suspicion of inciting subversion of state power. He served as the President of the Independent Chinese PEN Center, from 2003 to 2007. He was also the president of Minzhu Zhongguo (Democratic China) magazine starting in the mid-1990s. On 8 December 2008, Liu was detained due to his participation with the Charter 08 manifesto. He was formally arrested on 23 June 2009 on suspicion of "inciting subversion of state power". He was tried on the same charges on 23 December 2009 and sentenced to eleven years' imprisonment and two years' deprivation of political rights on 25 December 2009.

During his fourth prison term, Liu was awarded the 2010 Nobel Peace Prize for "his long and non-violent struggle for fundamental human rights in China." Liu was the first ethnically Chinese person of any citizenship to be awarded the peace prize as well as the first Chinese citizen to be awarded a Nobel Prize of any kind while residing in China. He was the third person to have been awarded the Nobel Peace Prize while in prison or detention, after Germany's Carl von Ossietzky (1935) and Burma's Aung San Suu Kyi (1991).

== Early life and work ==
Liu was born on 28 December 1955 in Changchun, Jilin province, to a family of intellectuals. Liu's father, Liu Ling (刘伶), was born in 1931 in Huaide County, Jilin. A professor of Chinese at Northeast Normal University, he died of liver disease in September 2011. Liu's mother, Zhang Suqin (张素勤; 張素勤), worked in the Northeast Normal University Nursery School. Liu Xiaobo was the third-born in a family of five boys.

- His eldest brother Liu Xiaoguang (刘晓光; 劉曉光), Dalian import and export clothing company manager, retired. He was estranged from Liu Xiaobo after the 1989 Tiananmen protests.
- His second brother, Liu Xiaohui (刘晓晖; 劉曉暉), is a historian who graduated from the Department of History of Northeast Normal University, and who became deputy director of the Museum of Jilin Province.
- His fourth brother Liu Xiaoxuan (刘晓暄; 劉曉暄), born in 1957, is professor of Energy and Materials, Guangdong University of Technology, engaged in optical functional polymer materials and light curing application technology research. In 1995, he was admitted as a PhD student at Tsinghua University, but Liu Xiaobo's political activities meant he was not allowed to take the examinations.
- His youngest brother, Liu Xiaodong (刘晓东; 劉曉東), died of heart disease early in the 1990s.

In 1969, during the Down to the Countryside Movement, Liu's father took him to Horqin Right Front Banner, Inner Mongolia. His father was a professor who remained loyal to the Communist Party. After finishing middle school in 1974, he was sent to the countryside to work on a farm in Jilin.

In 1977, Liu was admitted to the Department of Chinese Literature at Jilin University, where he founded a poetry group known as "The Innocent Hearts" (赤子心詩社) with six schoolmates. In 1982, he graduated with a Bachelor of Arts in literature before being admitted to the Department of Chinese Literature at Beijing Normal University as a research student, where he received an MA in literature in 1984, and started teaching as a lecturer thereafter. That year, he married Tao Li, with whom he had a son named Liu Tao in 1985.

In 1986, Liu started his doctoral study program and published his literary critiques in various magazines. He became renowned as a "dark horse" for his radical opinions and scathing comments on the official doctrines and establishments. Opinions such as these shocked both literary and ideological circles, and his influence on Chinese intellectuals was dubbed the "Liu Xiaobo Shock" or the "Liu Xiaobo Phenomenon". In 1987, his first book, Criticism of the Choice: Dialogs with Li Zehou, was published and became a nonfiction bestseller. It comprehensively criticized the Chinese tradition of Confucianism, and posed a frank challenge to Li Zehou, a rising ideological star who had a strong influence on contemporaneous young intellectuals in China.

In June 1988, Liu received a PhD in literature. His doctoral thesis, Esthetic and Human Freedom, passed the examination unanimously and was published as his second book. That same year he became a lecturer at the same department. He soon became a visiting scholar at several universities, including Columbia University, the University of Oslo, and the University of Hawaii. During the 1989 Tiananmen Square protests, Liu was in the United States but he decided to return to China to join the movement. He was later named one of the "four junzis of Tiananmen Square" for launching a hunger strike in support of the students. He also helped broker a peaceful exit for students remaining in the square. That year also saw the publication of his third book, The Fog of Metaphysics, a comprehensive review of Western philosophy. Soon, all of his works were banned in China.

== Thoughts and political views ==
=== On Chinese and Western cultures ===
Liu advocated for the Westernization of China. He echoed the New Cultural Movement's call for wholesale westernization and the rejection of Chinese traditional culture. In a 1988 interview with Hong Kong's Liberation Monthly (now known as Open Magazine), he said "modernization means wholesale westernization, choosing a human life is choosing a Western way of life. The difference between the Western and the Chinese governing system is humane vs in-humane, there's no middle ground ... Westernization is not a choice of a nation, but a choice for the human race." In the same interview, Liu also criticised the TV documentary River Elegy, for not sufficiently criticising Chinese culture and not promoting westernisation enthusiastically enough. Liu was quoted to have said, "If I were to make this I would show just how wimpy, spineless and fucked-up [齷齪、軟弱和操蛋] the Chinese really are". Liu regarded it most unfortunate that his monolingualism bound him to the Chinese cultural sphere. When asked what it would take for China to realize a true historical transformation. He replied:

[It would take] 300 years of colonialism. In 100 years of colonialism, Hong Kong has changed to what we see today. With China being so big, of course it would require 300 years as a colony for it to be able to transform into how Hong Kong is today. I have my doubts as to whether 300 years would be enough.

In an article in The New York Review of Books, Simon Leys wrote that Liu Xiaobo's perception of the West and its relationship to a modernizing China evolved during his travels in the United States and Europe in the 1980s.

During a visit to the Metropolitan Museum in New York City, he experienced a sort of epiphany that crystallized the turmoil of his latest self-questioning: he realized the shallowness of his own learning in the light of the fabulous riches of the diverse civilizations of the past, and simultaneously perceived the inadequacy of contemporary Western answers to mankind's modern predicament. His own dream that Westernization could be used to reform China suddenly appeared to him as pathetic as the attitude of 'a paraplegic laughing at a quadriplegic', he confessed at the time:

My tendency to idealize Western civilization arises from my nationalistic desire to use the West in order to reform China. But this has led me to overlook the flaws of Western culture ... I have been obsequious toward Western civilization, exaggerating its merits, and at the same time exaggerating my own merits. I have viewed the West as if it were not only the salvation of China but also the natural and ultimate destination of all humanity. Moreover I have used this delusional idealism to assign myself the role of savior ... I now realize that Western civilization, while it can be useful in reforming China in its present stage, cannot save humanity in an overall sense. If we stand back from Western civilization for a moment, we can see that it possesses all the flaws of humanity in general ... If I, as a person who has lived under China's autocratic system for more than thirty years, want to reflect on the fate of humanity or how to be an authentic person, I have no choice but to carry out two critiques simultaneously.

I must:

1. Use Western civilization as a tool to critique China.
2. Use my own creativity to critique the West.

In 2002, he reflected on his initial Maoist-flavored radical esthetic and political views in the 1980s:

I realize my entire youth and early writings had all been nurtured in hatred, violence and arrogance, or lies, cynicism and sarcasm. I knew at that time that Mao-style thinking and Cultural Revolution-style language had become ingrained in me, and my goal had been to transform myself [...]. It may take me a lifetime to get rid of the poison.

Liu admitted in 2006 in another interview with Open Magazine (formerly known as Liberation Monthly) that his 1988 response of "300 years of colonialism" was extemporaneous, although he did not intend to retract it, because it represented "an extreme expression of his longheld belief". The quote was nonetheless used against him. He has commented, "Even today [in 2006], radical patriotic 'angry youth' still frequently use these words to paint me with 'treason'."

Evolving from his esthetic notion of "individual subjectivity" as opposed to Li Zehou's theory of esthetic subjectivity which combined Marxist materialism and Kantian idealism, he upheld the notion of "esthetic freedom" which was based on the individualistic conception of freedom and esthetics. He also strongly criticized Chinese intellectuals' "traditional attitude of searching for rationalism and harmony as a slave mentality" just as it was criticized by radical left-wing literary critic Lu Xun during the New Culture Movement.

=== On Chinese democracy ===
In his letter to his friend Liao Yiwu in 2000, he expressed his thoughts on the prospects of the democracy movement in China:

Compared to others under the Communist black curtain, we cannot call ourselves real men. Through the great tragedies of all these years, we still don't have a righteous giant like [Václav] Havel. In order for everyone to have the right to be selfish, there has to be a righteous giant who will sacrifice selflessly. In order to obtain "passive freedoms" (freedom from the arbitrary oppression by those in power), there has to be a will for active resistance. In history, nothing is fated. The appearance of a martyr will to completely change a nation's soul and raise the spiritual quality of the people. But Gandhi was by chance, Havel was by chance; two thousand years ago, a peasant's boy born in the manger was even more by chance. Human progress relies on the chance birth of these individuals. One cannot count on the collective conscience of the masses but only on the great individual conscience to consolidate the weak masses. In particular, our nation needs this righteous giant; the appeal of a role model is infinite; a symbol can rouse an abundance of moral resources. For example, Fang Lizhi's ability to walk out of the U.S. Embassy, or Zhao Ziyang's ability to actively resist after stepping down, or so-and-so refusing to go abroad. A very important reason for the silence and amnesia after June Fourth is that we did not have a righteous giant who stepped forward.

He was also a strong critic of Chinese nationalism, believing that the "abnormal nationalism" which had existed in China over the last century had turned from a defensive style which contained "mixed feelings of inferiority, envy, complaint, and blame" into an aggressive form of "patriotism" that was filled with "blind self-confidence, empty boasts, and pent-up hatred". The "ultra-nationalism" being deployed by the Chinese Communist Party since the Tiananmen protests has also become "a euphemism for worship of violence in service of autocratic goals."

In 2009 during his trial for "inciting subversion of state power" due to his participation in drafting the Charter 08 manifesto which demanded freedom of expression, human rights and democratic elections, he wrote an essay known as "I Have No Enemies", stating that "the mentality of enmity can poison a nation's spirit, instigate brutal life and death struggles, destroy a society's tolerance and humanity, and block a nation's progress towards freedom and democracy", and he declared that he had no enemies, and no hatred.

=== On the Islamic world ===
Liu broadly supported U.S. militarism. He supported U.S. President George W. Bush's 2001 invasion of Afghanistan, his 2003 invasion of Iraq and subsequent reelection in 2004. Liu supported other U.S. interventions in the Middle East as well, alongside the Vietnam and Korean War.

In his 2004 article titled "Victory to the Anglo-American Freedom Alliance", he praised the U.S.-led post-Cold War conflicts as "best examples of how war should be conducted in a modern civilization." He wrote:

"Regardless of the savagery of the terrorists, and regardless of the instability of Iraq's situation, and, what's more, regardless of how patriotic youth might despise proponents of the United States such as myself, my support for the invasion of Iraq will not waver. Just as, from the beginning, I believed that the military intervention of Britain and the United States would be victorious, I am still full of belief in the final victory of the Freedom Alliance and the democratic future of Iraq, and even if the armed forces of Britain and the United States should encounter some obstacles such as those that they are currently facing, this belief of mine will not change."

He also predicted that "a free, democratic and peaceful Iraq will emerge."

Regarding Islamism, he commented that "a culture and (religious) system that has produced this kind of threat (Islamic fundamentalism) must be inherently intolerant and bloodthirsty." He also criticized abuse of Iraqi prisoners in American-run prisons. During the 2004 US presidential election, Liu again praised Bush for his war effort against Iraq and condemned Democratic Party candidate John Kerry for not sufficiently supporting the wars in which the U.S. was then involved.

=== On Japan ===
Liu strongly opposed Japanese militarism, Stating that "Japan's far-right politics is no longer merely a current of public opinion, but is increasingly becoming the policy choice of the Japanese government".He advocated the formation of an alliance between China and South Korea, joined by other Asian countries that had been victims of Japanese aggression.He argued that such a coalition that founded on both strength and moral legitmacy can exert pressure on Japan while seeking broad support from the international community, thereby leaving Japan morally isolated.

== Human rights activities ==
On 27 April 1989, Liu returned to Beijing and immediately became an active supporter of the movement. When the army seemed ready to violently eject the students who persistently occupied Tiananmen Square in order to challenge the government and the army that was enforcing its declaration of martial law, he initiated a four-man three-day hunger strike on 2 June. Later referred to as the "Tiananmen Four Gentlemen Hunger Strike", the action earned the trust of the students. He requested that both the government and the students abandon the ideology of class struggle and adopt a new political culture of dialogue and compromise. Although it was too late to prevent the massacre which started on the night of 3 June from occurring beyond the square, he and his colleagues successfully negotiated with the student leaders and the army commander so the several thousand students who remained in the square would all be allowed to peacefully withdraw from it, thus preventing a possibly much larger scale of bloodshed.

On 5 June, Liu was arrested and detained in Qincheng Prison for his alleged role in the movement, and three months later he was expelled from Beijing Normal University. The government's media issued numerous publications which labeled him a "mad dog" and a "black hand" because he had allegedly incited and manipulated the student movement to overthrow the government and socialism. His publications were banned, including his fourth book, Going Naked Toward God, which was then in press. In Taiwan however, his first and third books, Criticism of the Choice: Dialogues with Leading Thinker Li Zehou (1989), and the two-volume Mysteries of Thought and Dreams of Mankind (1990) were republished with some additions.

In January 1991, 19 months after his arrest, Liu Xiaobo was convicted of "counterrevolutionary propaganda and incitement" but he was exempted from criminal punishment due to his "major meritorious action" for preventing what could have been a bloody confrontation in Tiananmen Square. After his release, he was divorced; both his ex-wife and son subsequently emigrated to the US. He resumed his writing, mostly on human rights and political issues, but was not allowed to publish them in Mainland China.

In 1992, while in Taiwan, he published his first book after his imprisonment, The Monologues of a Doomsday's Survivor, a controversial memoir which contains his confessions and his political criticism of the popular movement in 1989.

In January 1993, Liu was invited to visit Australia and the United States for the interviews in the documentary film The Gate of Heavenly Peace. Although many of his friends suggested that he take refuge abroad, Liu returned to China in May 1993 and continued his freelance writing.

On 18 May 1995, the Chinese police took Liu into custody for launching a petition campaign on the eve of the sixth anniversary of the Tiananmen protests calling on the government to reassess the event and initiate political reform. He was held under residential surveillance in the suburbs of Beijing for nine months. He was released in February 1996 but was arrested again on 8 October for writing an October Tenth Declaration, coauthored by him and another prominent dissident, Wang Xizhe, mainly on the Taiwan issue, that advocated a peaceful reunification in order to oppose the Chinese Communist Party's forceful threats against the island. He was ordered to serve three years of reeducation through labor "for disturbing public order" for that statement.

In 1996, while he was still imprisoned in the labor camp, Liu married Liu Xia, who herself was not a prisoner. Because she was the only person from the outside allowed to visit him in prison, she was deemed his "most important link to the outside world."

After his release on 7 October 1999, Liu Xiaobo resumed his freelance writing. However, it was reported that the government built a sentry station next to his home and his phone calls and internet connections were tapped.

In 2000, while in Taiwan, Liu published the book A Nation That Lies to Conscience, a 400-page political criticism. Also published, in Hong Kong, was a Selection of Poems, a 450-page collection of the poems as correspondences between him and his wife during his imprisonment; it was coauthored by Liu and his wife. The last of three books which he published during the year was published in Mainland China, later titled "Selected Poems of Liu Xiaobo and Liu Xia" (劉曉波劉霞詩選), a 250-page collection of literary critiques coauthored by a popular young writer and himself under his unknown pen name of "Lao Xiao". The same year, Liu participated in founding the "Independent Chinese PEN Center," and was elected to both its board of directors and as its president in November 2003; he was reelected to both positions two years later. In 2007, he did not seek reelection as president but held his position as a board member until he was detained by the police in December 2008.

In 2003, when Liu started writing a human rights report on China at his home, his computer, letters and documents were all confiscated by the government. He once said, "at Liu Xia's [Liu's wife] birthday, her best friend brought two bottles of wine to [my home] but was blocked by the police from coming in. I ordered a [birthday] cake and the police also rejected the man who delivered the cake to us. I quarreled with them and the police said, 'it is for the sake of your security. It has happened many bomb attacks in these days.'" Those measures were loosened until 2007, prior to the 2008 Beijing Olympic Games.

In January 2005, following the death of former Chinese Premier Zhao Ziyang, who had shown sympathy towards the student demonstrations in 1989, Liu was immediately put under house arrest for two weeks before he learned about the death of Zhao. The same year, he published two more books in the US, The Future of Free China Exists in Civil Society, and Single-Blade Poisonous Sword: Criticism of Chinese Nationalism.

Liu's writing is considered subversive by the Chinese Communist Party, and his name is censored. He called for multi-party elections and free markets, advocated the values of freedom, supported separation of powers and urged the governments to be accountable for its wrongdoings. When not in prison, he was the subject of government monitoring and he was also put under house arrest during times that the government considered politically sensitive.

Liu's human rights work received international recognition. In 2004, Reporters Without Borders awarded him the Fondation de France Prize as a defender of press freedom.

Prison terms for Liu Xiaobo
| Date | Prison term | Reason | Result |
|---|---|---|---|
| January 1991 | June 1989 – January 1991 | Inciting counterrevolution | Imprisoned in Qincheng Prison awaiting trial, and discharged when he signed a "letter of repentance". |
| 1995 | May 1995 – January 1996 | Being involved in the democracy and human rights movement and publicly voicing the need to redress the government's wrongdoing with regard to its suppression of the student protest of 1989 | Released after being jailed for six months. |
| 1996 | 3 years of reeducation through labor | Disturbing the social order | Jailed in a labor education camp for three years. In 1996, he married Liu Xia (herself not a prisoner). Released in 1999. |
| 8 December 2008 | 11 years (died after 8.5 years) | Suspicion of the subversion of state authority | Sentenced to 11 years in prison and deprived of all political rights for two years. Imprisoned in Jinzhou Prison in Liaoning until he was transported to Shenyang's First Hospital of China Medical University, where he died. |

== Charter 08 ==
=== Conception and diffusion of Charter 08 ===
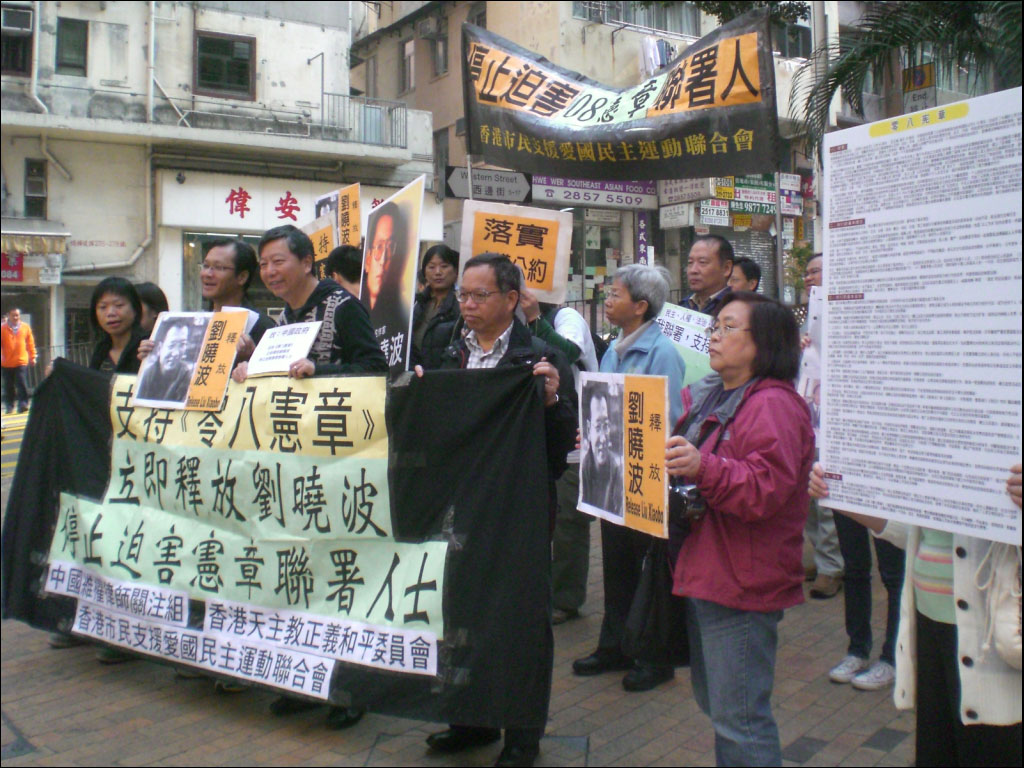
Political protest in Hong Kong against the detention of Liu Xiaobo

Liu Xiaobo was one of the authors of Charter 08, a manifesto that called for freedom of expression, human rights, more democratic elections, the privatization of state enterprises and land, and economic liberalism. Released on 10 December 2008 to coincide with the 60th anniversary of the adoption of the Universal Declaration of Human Rights and modeled after Charter 77, it was signed by 303 Chinese dissident intellectuals and human rights activists.

== 2008–2017 arrest, trial, and imprisonment ==
=== Arrest ===
On the evening of 8 December 2008, two days before the official release of Charter 08, Liu was taken into custody by the police along with Zhang Zuhua, another scholar and Charter 08 signatory. According to Zhang, the two were detained on suspicion of collecting signatures for the Charter. While Liu was detained in solitary confinement, he was forbidden to meet with either his lawyer or his family, but he was allowed to eat lunch with his wife, Liu Xia, and two policemen on New Year's Day 2009. On 23 June 2009, the Beijing procuratorate approved Liu's arrest on charges of "suspicion of inciting subversion of state power," a crime under Article 105 of China's Criminal Law. In a Xinhua news release announcing Liu's arrest, the Beijing Public Security Bureau alleged that Liu had incited the subversion of state power and the overthrow of the socialist system through methods such as spreading rumors and slander, citing Article 105 and noting that Liu had "fully confessed".

=== Trial ===
On 1 December 2009, Beijing police transferred Liu's case to the procuratorate for investigation and processing; on 10 December, the procuratorate formally indicted Liu on charges of "inciting subversion of state power" and sent his lawyers, Shang Baojun and Ding Xikui, the indictment document. He was tried at Beijing No. 1 Intermediate Court on 23 December 2009. His wife was not permitted to observe the hearing, although his brother-in-law was present. Diplomats from more than a dozen countries – including the U.S., Britain, Canada, Sweden, Australia and New Zealand – were denied access to the court in order to watch the trial and they all stood outside the court for its duration. Among them were Gregory May, political officer at the U.S. Embassy, and Nicholas Weeks, first secretary of the Swedish Embassy.

Liu wrote a statement, entitled "I have no enemies", intending for it to be read at his trial. He was never given the right to speak. The essay was later read in the 2010 Nobel Peace Prize ceremony, which Liu was unable to attend due to his imprisonment. On 25 December 2009, Liu was sentenced to eleven years' imprisonment and two years' deprivation of political rights by the Beijing No. 2 Intermediate Court on charges of "inciting subversion of state power". According to Liu's family and counsel, he planned to appeal the judgment. In the verdict, Charter 08 was named as part of the evidence supporting his conviction. John Pomfret of The Washington Post said Christmas Day was chosen to dump the news because the Chinese government believed Westerners were less likely to take notice on a holiday.

China's political reform ... should be gradual, peaceful, orderly and controllable and should be interactive, from above to below and from below to above. This way causes the least cost and leads to the most effective result. I know the basic principles of political change, that orderly and controllable social change is better than one which is chaotic and out of control. The order of a bad government is better than the chaos of anarchy. So I oppose systems of government that are dictatorships or monopolies. This is not 'inciting subversion of state power'. Opposition is not equivalent to subversion.

— Liu Xiaobo, 9 February 2010

Liu argued that his verdict violated both the Chinese constitution and the Universal Declaration of Human Rights of the United Nations. He argued that charges against him of 'spreading rumors, slandering and in other ways inciting the subversion of the government and overturning the socialist system' were contrived, as he did not fabricate or create false information, nor did he besmirch the good name and character of others by merely expressing a point of view, a value judgment.

Criminal law professor Gao Mingxuan characterized Liu's activities as publishing provocative speech on the Internet and gathering signatures to advocate the overthrow of government, activities he argued were prohibited by Chinese criminal law. However, Liu was advocating for the incremental and peaceful adoption of a democratic system with individual rights. The Ministry of Foreign Affairs of the People's Republic of China asserted that there are similar laws in many countries to prevent activities to advocate the overthrow of government, such as the Treason Act 1351 of England.

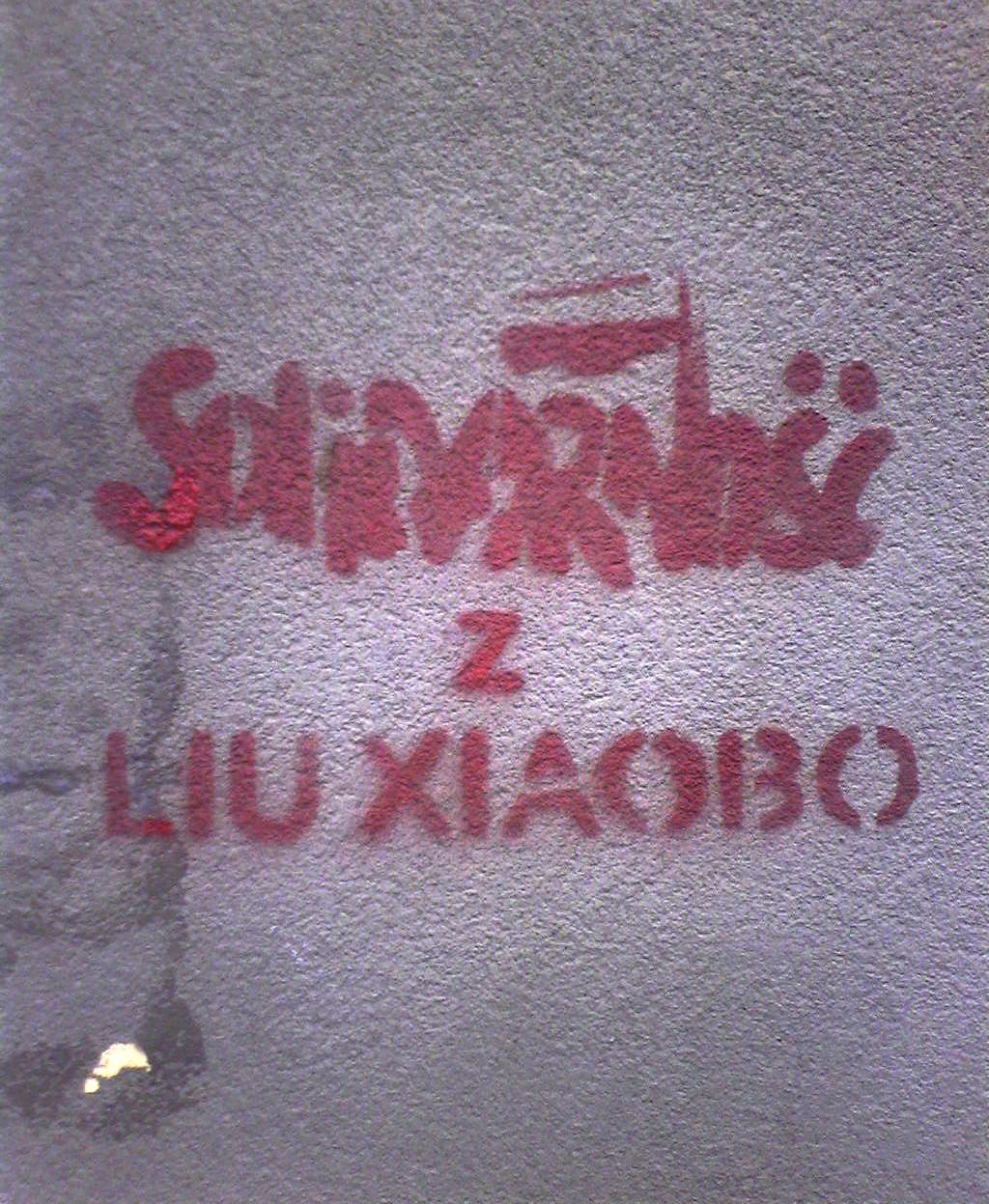
Polish mural in Warsaw, reading "Solidarity with Liu Xiaobo"

Liu's detention was condemned worldwide by both human rights organizations and foreign countries. On 11 December 2008, the U.S. Department of State called for Liu's release, which was followed on 22 December 2008 by a similar request from a consortium of scholars, writers, lawyers and human rights advocates. Additionally, on 21 January 2009, 300 international writers, including Salman Rushdie, Margaret Atwood, Ha Jin and Jung Chang, called for Liu's release in a statement put out through PEN. In March 2009, the One World Film Festival awarded Liu Xiaobo the Homo Homini Award, organized by the People in Need foundation, for promoting freedom of speech, democratic principles and human rights.

In December 2009, the European Union and United States issued formal appeals calling for the unconditional release of Liu Xiaobo. China's government, responding to the international calls prior to the verdict, stated that other nations should "respect China's judicial sovereignty and not do things that will interfere in China's internal affairs".

Responding to the verdict, United Nations Human Rights Commissioner Navanethem Pillay expressed concern about the deterioration of political rights in China. German Chancellor Angela Merkel strongly criticized the verdict, stating "despite the great progress in other areas in the expression of views, I regret that the Chinese government still massively restricts press freedom." Canada and Switzerland also condemned the verdict. The President of Taiwan Ma Ying-jeou called on Beijing to "tolerate dissent". On 6 January 2010, former Czech president Václav Havel joined with other communist-era dissidents at the Chinese Embassy in Prague to present a petition calling for Liu's release. On 22 January 2010, European Association for Chinese Studies sent an open letter to General Secretary of the Chinese Communist Party Hu Jintao on behalf of over 800 scholars from 36 countries calling for Liu's release.

On 18 January 2010, Liu was nominated for the 2010 Nobel Peace Prize by Václav Havel, the 14th Dalai Lama, André Glucksmann, Vartan Gregorian, Mike Moore, Karel Schwarzenberg, Desmond Tutu and Grigory Yavlinsky. China's Foreign Ministry spokesperson Ma Zhaoxu stated that awarding the Nobel Peace Prize to Liu would be "totally wrong". Geir Lundestad, a secretary of the Nobel Committee, stated the award would not be influenced by Beijing's opposition. On 25 September 2010, The New York Times reported that a petition in support of the Nobel nomination was being circulated in China.

On 14 September 2010, the Mayor of Reykjavík, Jón Gnarr, met on an unrelated matter with CPC Politburo member Liu Qi and demanded China set the dissident Liu Xiaobo free. Also that September Václav Havel, Dana Němcová and Václav Malý, leaders of Czechoslovakia's Velvet Revolution, published an open letter in the International Herald Tribune calling for the award to be given to Liu, while a petition began to circulate soon afterwards.

On 6 October 2010, the non-governmental organization Freedom Now, which serves as an international counsel to Liu Xiaobo as retained by his family, publicly released a letter from 30 members of the U.S. Congress to President Barack Obama, urging him to directly raise both Liu's case and that of fellow imprisoned dissident Gao Zhisheng to Chinese leader Hu Jintao at the G-20 Summit in November 2010. The Republic of China's President Ma Ying-jiu congratulated Liu on winning the Nobel Prize and requested that the Chinese authorities improve their impression in the eyes of the world by respecting human rights, but did not call for his release from prison.

On 15 October 2010, the state media outlet China News Service stated that in 2008 Liu had received a financial endowment from the National Endowment for Democracy.

In 2011, a WorldWideReading was dedicated to Liu Xiaobo; on 20 March, readings in more than 60 towns and cities on all continents and broadcast via radio stations were held in his honor. The "Freedom for Liu Xiaobo" appeal was supported by more than 700 writers from around the world, among them Nobel Prize laureates John M. Coetzee, Nadine Gordimer, Herta Müller and Elfriede Jelinek, as well as Breyten Breytenbach, Eliot Weinberger, Salman Rushdie, Vikram Seth, Mario Vargas Llosa, Wolf Biermann and Dave Eggers.

On 20 March 2011, the international literature festival called for a worldwide reading for Liu Xiaobo. More than 700 authors from all continents signed the appeal and over 150 institutions took part in the event.

On 19 November 2013, his wife, Liu Xia, who was placed under house arrest shortly after Liu Xiaobo was awarded the Nobel Peace Prize, filed an appeal for Liu Xiaobo's retrial. This move has been called "extraordinary" because the action could refocus the world's attention on China's human rights record. According to her attorney, Mo Shaoping, Liu Xia visited her husband in Jinzhou Prison in Liaoning and gained his approval before filing this motion.

== Nobel Peace Prize ==
On 8 October 2010, the Nobel Committee awarded Liu the Nobel Peace Prize "for his long and non-violent struggle for fundamental human rights in China", saying that Liu had long been front-runner as the recipient of the prize. Liu's wife, Liu Xia, expressed gratitude on behalf of her husband to the Nobel Committee, Liu's proposers, and those who have been supporting him since 1989, including the Tiananmen Mothers—family members or representatives of those who were killed, or had disappeared, in the 1989 Tiananmen Square protests and massacre. She said, "The prize should belong to all who signed Charter 08 and were jailed due to their support".

Liu Xia informed her husband of his award during a visit to Jinzhou Prison on 9 October 2010, one day after the official announcement. She reported that Liu wept and dedicated the award to those who suffered as a result of the Tiananmen Square protests of 1989, saying: "The award is first and foremost for the Tiananmen martyrs." After Mrs. Liu returned home, she was put under house arrest and was watched by armed guards. She expressed the desire to attend the awards ceremony in Norway in December, but was skeptical of her chances of being allowed to do so. Liu Xia wrote an open letter to 143 prominent figures, encouraging them to attend the award ceremony in Oslo.

Liu was the second person to have been denied the right to have a representative collect the Nobel Prize for him as well as the second to die in custody, with the first being Ossietzky. Berit Reiss-Andersen, chairman of the Norwegian Nobel Committee, blamed the Chinese communist regime for his death and said that "Liu Xiaobo had contributed to the fraternity of peoples through his non-violent resistance against the oppressive actions of the Communist regime in China."

China reacted negatively to the award, immediately censoring news about the announcement of the award in China, though later that day limited news of the award became available. Foreign news broadcasters including CNN and the BBC were immediately blocked, while heavy censorship was applied to personal communications. The Chinese Foreign Ministry denounced the award to Liu Xiaobo, saying that it "runs completely counter to the principle of the award and it is also a desecration of the Peace Prize". The Norwegian ambassador to the People's Republic of China was summoned by the Foreign Ministry on 8 October 2010 and presented with an official complaint about the granting of the Nobel Peace Prize to Liu. The Chinese government has called Liu Xiaobo a criminal and stated that he does not deserve the prize. Chinese dissident Wei Jingsheng, in his response to news of the award, criticized Liu by calling him "the accomplice of the Communist regime." As a result, nearly all large-scale commercial trading between Norway and China was limited, and relations soured until after Liu Xiaobo's death in 2017, when talks resumed. In October 2018, the Norwegian King Harald V visited Beijing and met with General Secretary of the Chinese Communist Party Xi Jinping, symbolizing the recovery of China–Norway relations.

Global Times, part of the Chinese government-owned People's Daily, published a statement saying that Liu Xiaobo and his case had properly undergone "strict legal procedure", blaming Western regimes for sensationalizing the Liu Xiaobo story "in defiance of China's judicial sovereignty". The Chinese paper also rejected the view that Liu Xiaobo should be described as "China's Mandela", by stating: "Mandela was a Nobel Peace Prize laureate for leading African people to anti-apartheid victory through struggles ... however, awarding a Chinese prisoner who confronted authorities and was rejected by mainstream Chinese society derides China's judicial system ... [which] makes sure a society of 1.3 billion people runs smoothly."

Following the announcement of the Nobel Peace Prize, celebrations in China were either stopped or curtailed, and prominent intellectuals and other dissidents were detained, harassed or put under surveillance; Liu's wife, Liu Xia, was placed under house arrest and she was forbidden to talk to reporters even though no official charges were filed against her. Sixty-five countries with missions in Norway were all invited to the Nobel Prize ceremony, but fifteen of them declined the invitation, in some cases due to heavy lobbying by China. Besides China, these countries included Russia, Kazakhstan, Tunisia, Saudi Arabia, Pakistan, Iraq, Iran, Vietnam, Venezuela, Egypt, Sudan, Cuba, and Morocco.

China also imposed travel restrictions on known dissidents ahead of the ceremony. A non-governmental Chinese group presented its Confucius Peace Prize as an alternative and awarded it to former Taiwanese Vice-President Lien Chan for promoting peace between Taiwan and Mainland China. Lien Chan denied receiving any award.

== Medical parole and health ==
On 26 June 2017, it was reported that Liu had been granted medical parole after being diagnosed with terminal liver cancer in late May 2017. The Shenyang Justice Ministry released a statement on 5 July saying that the First Hospital of China Medical University, where Liu was being treated, has invited cancer experts from the United States, Germany and other nations to join its team of doctors. However, the statement did not mention which foreign doctors had been invited or whether or not any of them had responded. A statement one day later from the hospital said that Liu was admitted on 7 June. On 8 July, the hospital said that Joseph M. Herman of University of Texas MD Anderson Cancer Center and Markus Büchler of Heidelberg University had joined domestic experts for group consultation. The foreign doctors said that Liu had indicated that he wanted to be sent abroad for treatment. Acknowledging the risk that is involved when a patient is moved, they deemed that Liu was fit to travel abroad in order to receive the care which they were willing to provide him. However, the hospital said that the foreign doctors had confirmed that even they had no better treatment methods and also that the domestic doctors had done a very good job. On 10 July, the hospital said that Liu was in critical condition, and that he was suffering from an increasingly bloated stomach, an inflamed abdominal wall, falling blood pressure, faltering kidneys, growing cancer lesions, and that they were actively rescuing him, and were starting to use continuous renal replacement therapy (CRRT). On 12 July, the hospital said that Liu was suffering from liver failure (Child–Pugh class C), kidney failure, respiratory failure, septic shock, blood clot, etc. and that they had communicated the necessity for tracheal intubation, but his family had rejected the procedure. The New York Times reported that Liu's family could not be independently reached for confirmation of his condition.

== Death and funeral ==
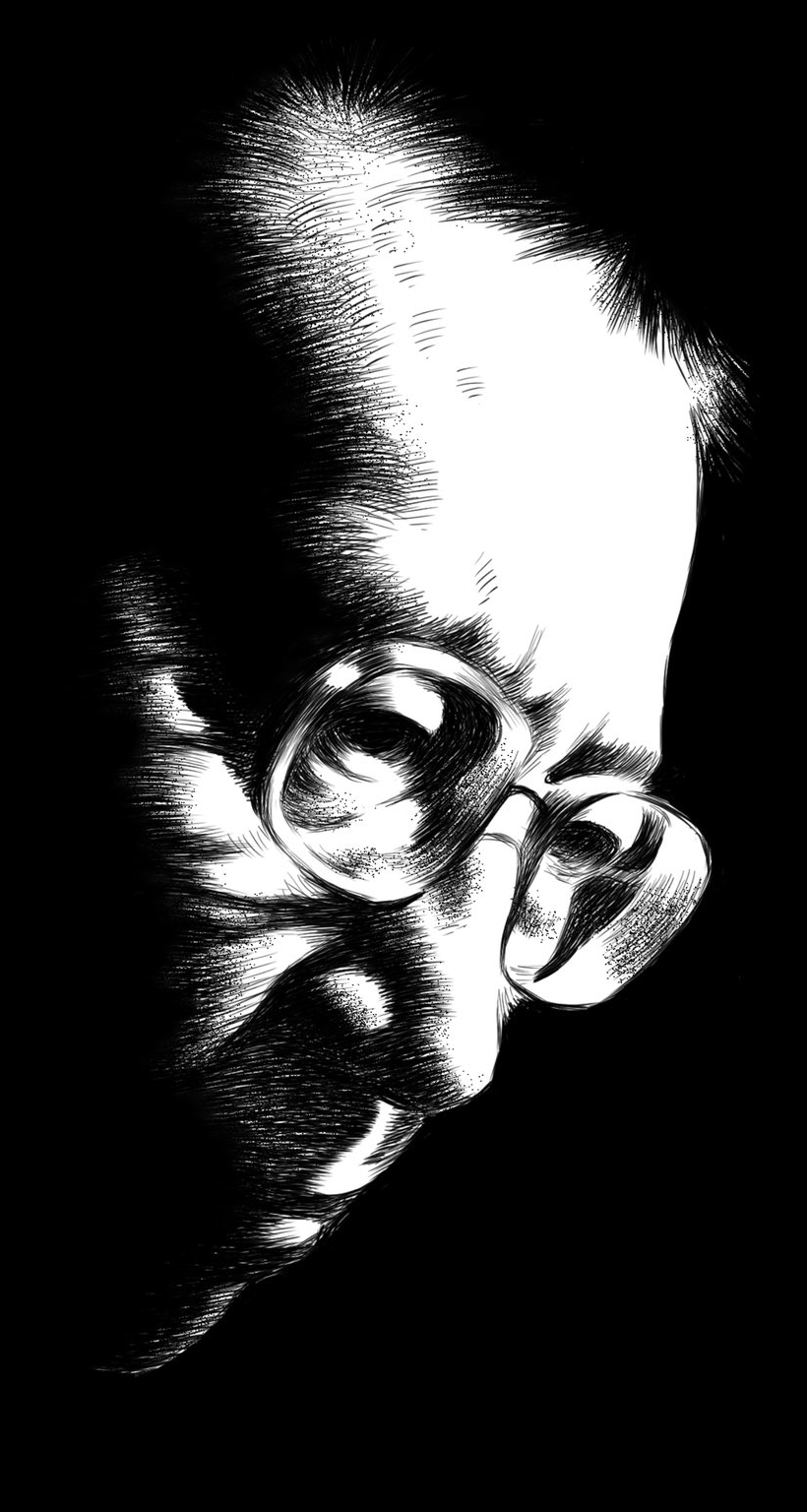
Portrait of Liu Xiaobo by Rebel Pepper

Liu Xiaobo died on 13 July 2017 in Shenyang's First Hospital of China Medical University from liver cancer.

=== Censorship ===
Since his death, the fate of Liu Xiaobo has been compared by the media of the world to that of Carl von Ossietzky, Nobel Laureate in 1935 who also died as a prisoner of Nazi Germany. Whilst Liu's death was widely reported in the Western media, it was mentioned only in the most perfunctory manner in the press inside mainland China. Censors deleted images or emojis of candles, or a simple "RIP"; searches on Weibo regarding Liu's health returned the message: "According to relevant laws and policies, results for 'Liu Xiaobo' cannot be displayed". The Citizen Lab documented censorship of the death of Liu Xiaobo on WeChat and Weibo." They noted on 16 July censorship on WeChat of images related to Liu after his death, and found that even images were being blocked in one-to-one chat the first time as well as in group chat and WeChat Moments. Based on analyses of search term blocking on Weibo, the lab confirmed that a blanket ban on searches for Liu Xiaobo's name was still being applied. They said: "In fact, just his given name of Xiaobo is enough to trigger censorship in English and both Simplified and Traditional Chinese..."

On the early morning of 15 July 2017, a brief funeral service was held for Liu which Liu's body was cremated following a short mourning service. Liu's mourning ceremony and funeral were heavily stage-managed as friends and supporters had been warned that public funeral or memorial would not be tolerated. All the questions international journalists have been asking about Liu failed to appear in official transcripts of news briefings by the Chinese foreign ministry. Germany, UK, France, the United States, Taiwan and the UN High Commissioner for Human Rights, Zeid Ra'ad Al Hussein, called for the People's Republic of China to allow Liu Xiaobo's wife Liu Xia to travel and leave the country if she wishes.

=== Funeral ===
The funeral was organized in a heavy-handed fashion in which Chinese government attempted to defend their treatment of Liu and his wife, even though it was clear they and their family members were under perpetual surveillance. Although the funeral was attended by a brother of Ms. Liu and two of Mr. Liu's brothers and their wives, none of Liu's friends could be identified from official photographs of the mourners. A government spokesman said: "Liu Xia is free now, [but was] grief-stricken and doesn't need to be disturbed". The government claimed that Liu had been cremated, and his ashes scattered into the sea at the family's own request. His eldest brother, Liu Xiaoguang appeared at the same press briefing, thanked the Chinese Communist party and also the government "because everything they have done for our family shows a high level of humanity and personal care to us". According to Liu Xiaobo's biographer Yu Jie, Liu had excommunicated his eldest brother, Xiaoguang, after the 1989 Tiananmen Square protests and massacre, calling him a "petty bureaucrat of the Communist Party". Yu further criticized Xiaoguang for usurping Liu Xia's position of next of kin and his "shamelessness" in attempting to grab a share of Liu's Nobel Prize money. The government of China has been accused by Liu's supporters of trying to erase any shrine or traces to Liu Xiaobo with a sea burial of his remains. Chinese human rights activists Hu Jia stated to the South China Morning Post that the hasty actions were "humiliating to a Nobel winner".

In Hong Kong, which at the time, had civil rights that are nonexistent in mainland China, activists organized the only large-scale commemoration for Liu on Chinese soil. A vigil outside the Beijing Liaison Office started on 10 July and continued until his death. Some newspapers in the city splashed Liu's portrait on their front pages to announce his death, while other pro-Communist journals relegated coverage to the inner pages. In the Legislative Council legislators of the Pro-democracy camp made seven attempts to table a debate on Liu, but president of the council, Andrew Leung, who is from the governing faction, rejected the attempts on the grounds that the matter did not have "urgent public importance according to 16.2 of the Rules of Procedure, [and that] the wording of their petitions lacked neutrality".

=== Reactions ===
==== Sinosphere ====
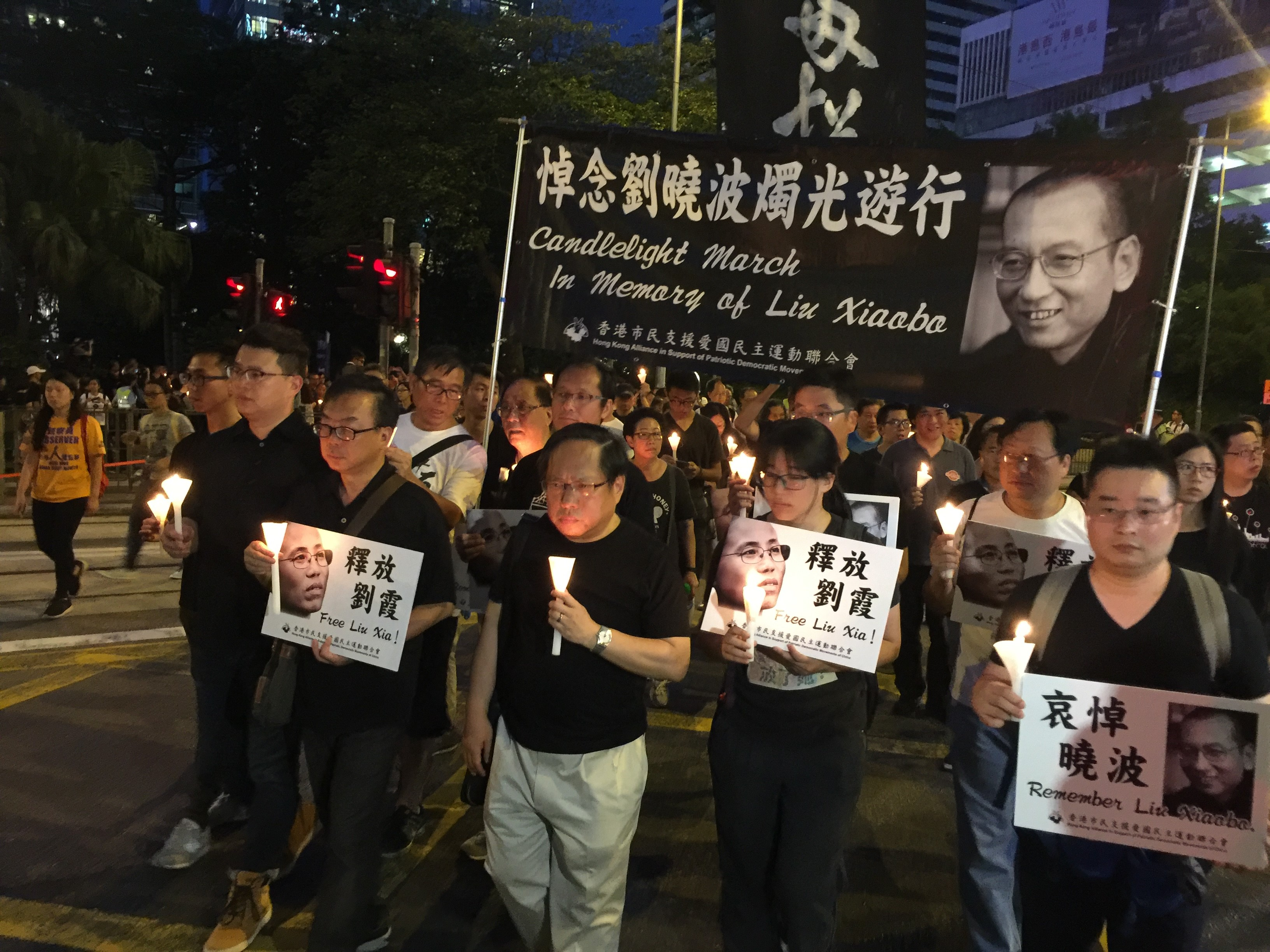
March in memory of Liu Xiaobo in Hong Kong

People's Republic of China: The Ministry of Foreign Affairs' spokesman Geng Shuang chastised foreign officials' "improper comments on Liu Xiaobo's death of illness" and said that China had lodged "stern representations" with their countries. Geng also said on 14 July that "Conferring the prize to such a person goes against the purposes of this award. It's a blasphemy of the peace prize", according to the Voice of America. But an almost identical report from Voice of America Chinese also wrote that Geng's statement could not be found from the regular press briefing's Q&A transcript posted on the ministry's website.

Republic of China: President of the Republic of China Tsai Ing-wen pleaded with the Communist government to "show confidence in engaging in political reform so that the Chinese can enjoy the God-given rights of freedom and democracy ... The Chinese Dream is not supposed to be about military might. It should be about taking ideas like those from Liu Xiaobo into consideration. Only through democracy, in which every Chinese person has freedom and respect, can China truly become a proud and important country." In his tribute on Facebook, former ROC President and leader of the Kuomintang Ma Ying-jeou said the Chinese dream should develop proportionally on freedom and human rights. Mayor of Taipei Ko Wen-je expressed condolences.

Tibetan Government in Exile: The 14th Dalai Lama, who himself is the 1989 Nobel Peace Prize winner, the Speaker of the Tibetan Parliament-in-Exile, Khenpo Sonam Tenphel, and Prime Minister of the Tibetan Government-in-Exile, Lobsang Sangay mourned the death of Liu. The Dalai Lama issued the following short statement on 14 July 2017, "I am deeply saddened to learn that fellow Nobel Laureate Liu Xiaobo has passed away while undergoing a lengthy prison sentence. I offer my prayers and condolences to his wife, Liu Xia and to other members of his family. Although he is no longer living, the rest of us can best pay honor to Liu Xiaobo by carrying forward the principles he has long embodied, which would lead to a more harmonious, stable and prosperous China. It is my belief that Nobel Laureate Liu Xiaobo's unceasing efforts in the cause of freedom will bear fruit before long."

==== International ====
===== States =====
France: President Emmanuel Macron, who hosted a press conference for visiting US President Trump, later paid tribute to Liu in a tweet, praising him as "a freedom fighter". French Foreign Minister Jean-Yves Le Drian expressed condolences as well.

Germany: Chancellor Angela Merkel described Liu Xiaobo as a "courageous fighter for civil rights and freedom of expression". Foreign Minister Sigmar Gabriel said that "China now has the responsibility to quickly, transparently and plausibly answer the question of whether the cancer could not have been identified much earlier."

Japan: Both the Minister of Foreign Affairs Fumio Kishida and Chief Cabinet Secretary Yoshihide Suga expressed condolences.

Norway: Prime Minister of Norway Erna Solberg said that "It is with deep grief that I received the news of Liu Xiaobo's passing. Liu Xiaobo was for decades a central voice for human rights and China's further development." Thorbjørn Jagland, a member and former chairman of the Norwegian Nobel Committee, and a former Prime Minister of Norway, compared Liu Xiaobo to Carl von Ossietzky, noting that he became the second Nobel Prize laureate who was prevented from receiving the prize because he died in prison. An official statement by the Norwegian Nobel Committee blamed the Chinese communist regime for Liu Xiaobo's death and condemned the erosion of human rights as a universal value; on behalf of the committee, chairwoman Reiss-Andersen said that "Liu Xiaobo had contributed to the fraternity of peoples through his non-violent resistance against the oppressive actions of the Communist regime in China" and that "the Chinese Government bears a heavy responsibility for his premature death". Reiss-Andersen said Liu Xiaobo will remain "a powerful symbol for all who fight for freedom, democracy and a better world". She also lamented the "sad and disturbing fact that the representatives of the free world, who themselves hold democracy and human rights in high regard, are less willing to stand up for those rights for the benefit of others."

United Kingdom: Foreign Secretary Boris Johnson called Liu a "lifelong campaigner for democracy, human rights and peace", and said that his death was a huge loss. He further stated that "Liu Xiaobo should have been allowed to choose his own medical treatment overseas" and called for the Chinese authorities "to lift all restrictions" on Liu's widow.

United States: The White House Press Secretary issued a statement of condolences. Secretary of State Rex Tillerson said that "Mr Liu dedicated his life to the betterment of his country and humankind, and to the pursuit of justice and liberty," and urged Beijing to free Liu's widow. U.S. Ambassador to the United Nations Nikki Haley and U.S. Ambassador to China Terry Branstad both expressed condolences.

The Congressional-Executive Commission on China, whose commissioners come from both the House of Representatives and Senate, issued a bipartisan statement. The United States House Foreign Affairs Subcommittee on Africa, Global Health, Global Human Rights and International Organizations held a hearing on Liu and his death (entitled "The Tragic Case of Liu Xiaobo"). Nancy Pelosi, the House Minority Leader, was saddened by the news of Liu's passing. Back on 18 May, both Republican Senator Ted Cruz and Representative Mark Meadows had re-introduced bills to resume their push to rename the address of Embassy of China in Washington, D.C. as "1 Liu Xiaobo Plaza." Bob Fu, a Chinese American human rights activist and pastor, told The Texas Tribune that he is "definitely more optimistic" about Cruz's bill getting enacted with President Trump in office. Later Senator Marco Rubio wrote a letter, which was sent to Liu Xia, Liu Xiaobo's widow. Senator John McCain said that "this is only the latest example of Communist China's assault on human rights, democracy, and freedom."

Former president George W. Bush and First Lady Laura Bush also expressed condolences.

===== Organizations =====
European Union: President of the European Commission Jean-Claude Juncker and President of the European Council Donald Tusk said in a joint statement that they had learned of Liu's death "with deep sadness" and that "We appeal to the Chinese authorities to allow his wife, Ms Liu Xia and his family to bury Liu Xiaobo at a place and in a manner of their choosing, and to allow them to grieve in peace".

United Nations: UN High Commissioner for Human Rights Zeid Ra'ad Al Hussein said, "The human rights movement in China and across the world has lost a principled champion who devoted his life to defending and promoting human rights, peacefully and consistently, and who was jailed for standing up for his beliefs. Liu Xiaobo was the true embodiment of the democratic, non-violent ideals he so ardently advocated."

== Major works ==
- Criticism of the Choice: Dialogues with LI Zehou. Shanghai People's Publishing House. 1987.
- Criticism of the Choice: Dialogues with Leading Thinker LI Zehou. Shanghai People's Publishing House. 1989.
- Esthetics and Human Freedom. Beijing Normal University Press. 1988.
- Going Naked Toward God. Time Literature and Art Publishing House. 1989.
- The Fog of Metaphysics. Shanghai People's Publishing House. 1989.
- Mysteries of Thought and Dreams of Mankind, 2 volumes. Strom & Stress Publishing Company. 1989–1990.
- Contemporary Politics and Intellectuals of China. Tangshan Publishing Company, Taiwan. 1990.
- Criticism on Contemporary Chinese Intellectuals (Japanese Translation). Tokuma Bookstore, Tokyo. 1992.
- The Monologues of a Doomsday's Survivor. China Times Publishing Company, Taiwan. 1993.
- Selected Poems of Liu Xiaobo and Liu Xia. Xiafei'er International Press, Hong Kong. 2000.
- Under pen name Lao Xia and coauthored with Wang Shuo (2000). A Belle Gave me Knockout Drug. Changjiang Literary Press.
- A Nation That Lies to Conscience. Jie-jou Publishing Company, Taiwan. 2002.
- Civil Awakening—The Dawn of a Free China. Laogai Research Foundation. 2005.
- A Single Blade and Toxic Sword: Critique on Contemporary Chinese Nationalism. Broad Press Inc, Sunnyvale. 2006.
- Falling of A Great Power: Memorandum to China. Yunchen Culture. October 2009.
- From TianAnMen Incident to Charter 08 (in Japanese ): Memorandum to China. Fujiwara Bookstore, Tokyo. December 2009.
- No Enemies, No Hatred. The Belknap Press of Harvard University Press. 2012.
- June Fourth Elegies: Poems translated from the Chinese by Jeffrey Yang With a Foreword by His Holiness the Dalai Lama Bilingual Edition. Graywolf Press. 2012.

== Awards and honors ==
- Hellman-Hammett Grant (1990, 1996)
- China Foundation on Democracy Education for Outstanding Democratic Activist (2003)
- Fondation de France Prize for defender of press freedom (2004)
- Hong Kong Human Rights Press Awards (2004, 2005, 2006)

- Excellent Award (2004) for an article Corrupted News is not News, published on Open Magazine, January 2004 issue
- Grand Prize (2005) for an article Paradise of the Powerful, Hell of the Vulnerable on Open Magazine, September 2004 issue
- Excellent Award (2006) for The Causes and Ending of Shanwei Bloodshed on Open Magazine, January 2006

- Asia-Pacific Human Rights Foundation (Australia) Courage of Conscience Award (2007)
- People in Need (Czech) Homo Homini Award (2009)
- PEN/Barbara Goldsmith Freedom to Write Award (2009)
- Independent Federation of Chinese Students and Scholars (USA) Free Spirit Award (2009)
- German PEN Hermann Kesten Medal (2010)
- Nobel Peace Prize (2010)
- Giuseppe Motta Medal (2010)
- Honorary member of German, American, Portuguese, Czech and Sydney PEN Centers and Honorary President of Independent Chinese PEN Center.

A statue of Liu Xiaobo in Hong Kong was removed in November 2021 after the police objected to its presence.

== See also ==
- Carl von Ossietzky
- Charter 08
- Human rights in China
- Inciting subversion of state power
- List of Chinese dissidents
- List of Chinese Nobel laureates
- List of Chinese pro-democracy activists
- Literary inquisition
- Weiquan movement
- Wolf warrior diplomacy

Awards and achievements
| Preceded by Barack Obama | Nobel Peace Prize Laureate; 2010 | Succeeded by Ellen Johnson Sirleaf; Leymah Gbowee; Tawakel Karman |
