= Sri Chinmoy bibliography =

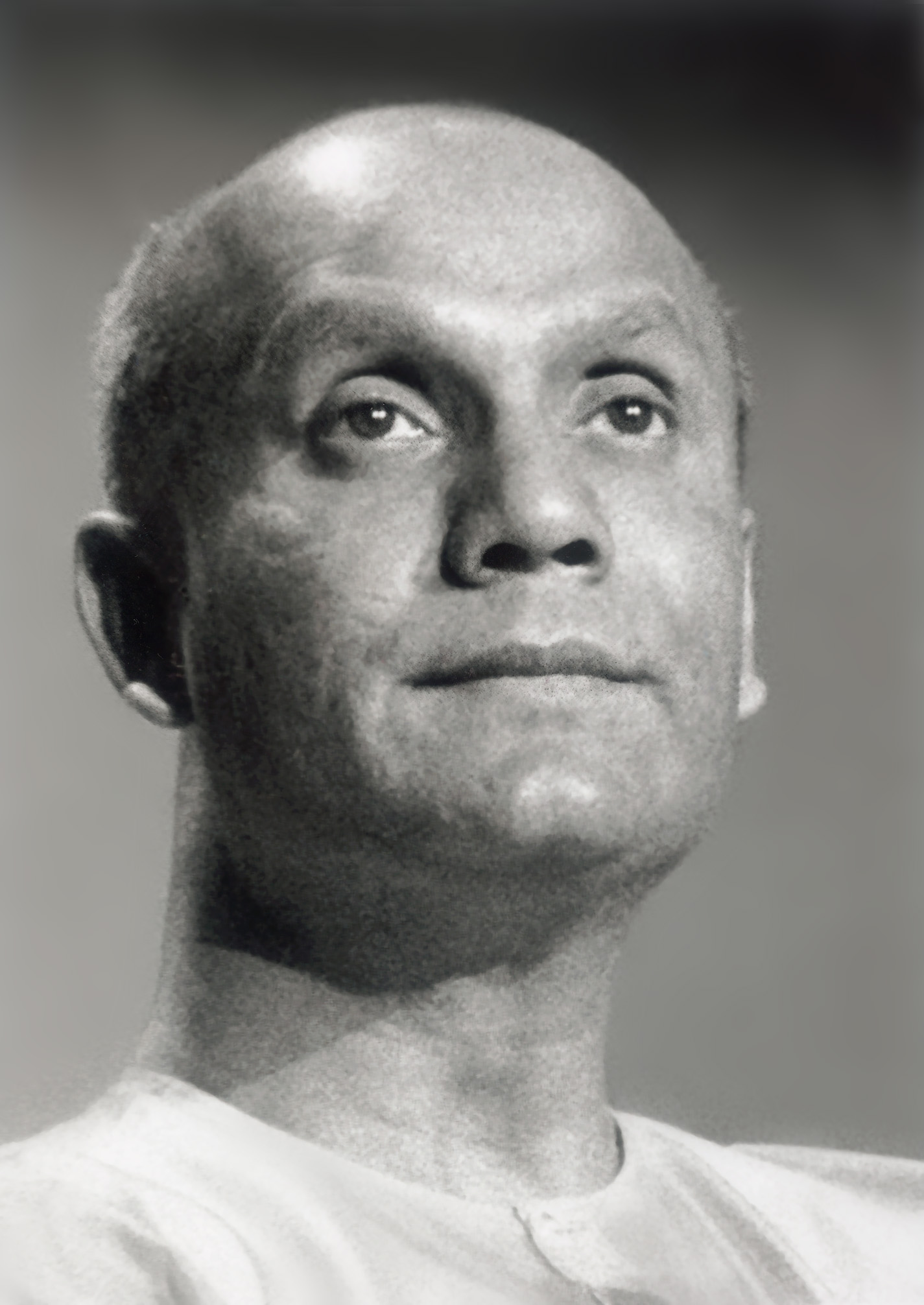
- Books↙: 1594

Bibliography of the 1594 written works from Indian spiritual leader Sri Chinmoy (1931–2007), sorted by date of first-editions. Sri Chinmoy also wrote many articles in the magazine AUM, published by his organization from 1965 to 1981.

== Bibliography ==
Book Cover

- (1970) Meditations. Food for the Soul —Aphorisms
- (1970) My Ivy League Leaves —Lectures
- (1970) Yoga and the Spiritual Life. The Journey of India's Soul —Discourses; Answers
- (1971) Love Realised, Surrender Fulfilled, Oneness Manifested —Short stories
- (1971) My Rose Petals, part 1 —Lectures
- (1971) Children's Conversations with God —Conversations
- (1971) My God Then God Now —Poetry
- (1971) My Lord's Secrets Revealed —Poetry; Conversations
- (1971) Songs of the Soul —Discourses
- (1972) Arise! Awake! Thoughts of a Yogi —Aphorisms; Poetry
- (1972) My Flute —Poetry
- (1972) God Wants to Read This Book —Aphorisms
- (1972) The Upanishads: The Crown of India's Soul —Lectures
- (1972) In Search of a Perfect Disciple —Short stories
- (1972) The Garland of Nation-Souls —Talks
- (1972) Eternity's Breath —Discourses; Aphorisms
- (1972) The Vedas: Immortality's First Call —Lectures
- (1972) A Seeker's Universe —Poetry
- (1973) The Supreme and His Four Children. Five Spiritual Dictionaries —Commentary; Poetry
- (1973) Mother, Give Me the Light of Knowledge —Commentary; Poetry
- (1973) The Disciple Illumines the Master —Plays
- (1973) Commentary on the Bhagavad Gita: the Song of the Transcendental Soul —Commentary; Discourses
- (1973) God's Hour —Aphorisms
- (1973) Supreme Sacrifice —Plays
- (1973) The Heart of a Holy Man —Plays
- (1973) Singer of the Eternal Beyond —Plays
- (1973) My Rama Is My All —Plays
- (1973) Siddhartha Becomes the Buddha —Plays
- (1973) Lord Gauranga: Love Incarnate —Plays
- (1973) The Son —Plays
- (1973) Drink, Drink My Mother's Nectar —Plays
- (1973) The Dance of Life, part 01 —Poetry
- (1973) The Dance of Life, part 02 —Poetry
- (1973) The Dance of Life, part 03 —Poetry
- (1973) The Dance of Life, part 04 —Poetry
- (1973) The Dance of Life, part 05 —Poetry
- (1973) The Dance of Life, part 06 —Poetry
- (1973) The Dance of Life, part 07 —Poetry
- (1973) The Dance of Life, part 08 —Poetry
- (1973) The Dance of Life, part 09 —Poetry
- (1973) The Dance of Life, part 10 —Poetry
- (1973) The Dance of Life, part 11 —Poetry
- (1973) The Dance of Life, part 12 —Poetry
- (1973) The Dance of Life, part 13 —Poetry
- (1973) The Dance of Life, part 14 —Poetry
- (1973) The Dance of Life, part 15 —Poetry
- (1973) The Dance of Life, part 16 —Poetry
- (1973) The Dance of Life, part 17 —Poetry
- (1973) The Dance of Life, part 18 —Poetry
- (1973) The Dance of Life, part 19 —Poetry
- (1973) The Dance of Life, part 20 —Poetry
- (1973) The Ascent and Descent of the Disciples —Short stories
- (1973) God's Orchestra, A-Z, Compilation —Commentary
- (1973) Kundalini: The Mother-Power —Lectures
- (1973) Entertainment Versus Enlightenment —Short stories
- (1973) Something, Somehow, Somewhere, Someday —Poetry
- (1973) You —Aphorisms
- (1973) Rainbow-Flowers, part 1 —Commentary
- (1973) The Garden of Love-Light, part 1 —Songs
- (1973) The Garden of Love-Light, part 2 —Songs
- (1973) Kennedy: The Universal Heart —Tributes
- (1973) My Salutation to Japan —Discourses; Poetry
- (1973) The Silence of Death —Poetry
- (1973) America in Her Depths —Discourses; Poetry
- (1973) Astrology, the Supernatural and the Beyond —Answers
- (1973) Death and Reincarnation —Discourses
- (1973) Promised Light from the Beyond —Lectures; Answers; Poetry
- (1973) Animal Kingdom —Poetry; Commentary
- (1973) Flame-Goal. Daily meditations —Aphorisms
- (1973) Colour Kingdom —Commentary; Aphorisms
- (1973) Try, You Too Can Laugh —Short stories
- (1974) Beyond Within —Discourses; Answers
- (1974) My Maple Tree —Lectures
- (1974) My Rose Petals, part 2 —Lectures
- (1974) Sri Chinmoy Primer —Answers
- (1974) The Master Surrenders —Short stories
- (1974) The Wings of Light, part 01 —Poetry
- (1974) The Wings of Light, part 02 —Poetry
- (1974) The Wings of Light, part 03 —Poetry
- (1974) The Wings of Light, part 04 —Poetry
- (1974) The Wings of Light, part 05 —Poetry
- (1974) The Wings of Light, part 06 —Poetry
- (1974) The Wings of Light, part 07 —Poetry
- (1974) The Wings of Light, part 08 —Poetry
- (1974) The Wings of Light, part 09 —Poetry
- (1974) The Wings of Light, part 10 —Poetry
- (1974) The Wings of Light, part 11 —Poetry
- (1974) The Wings of Light, part 12 —Poetry
- (1974) The Wings of Light, part 13 —Poetry
- (1974) The Wings of Light, part 14 —Poetry
- (1974) The Wings of Light, part 15 —Poetry
- (1974) The Wings of Light, part 16 —Poetry
- (1974) The Wings of Light, part 17 —Poetry
- (1974) The Wings of Light, part 18 —Poetry
- (1974) The Wings of Light, part 19 —Poetry
- (1974) The Wings of Light, part 20 —Poetry
- (1974) The Goal Is Won —Poetry
- (1974) Why the Masters Don't Mix —Short stories
- (1974) Fifty Freedom-Boats to One Golden Shore, part 1 —Lectures
- (1974) Fifty Freedom-Boats to One Golden Shore, part 2 —Lectures
- (1974) Fifty Freedom-Boats to One Golden Shore, part 3 —Lectures
- (1974) Fifty Freedom-Boats to One Golden Shore, part 4 —Lectures
- (1974) Three Hundred Sixty-Five Father's Day Prayers —Poetry
- (1974) One Lives, One Dies —Short stories
- (1974) Supreme, I Sing Only For You —Songs
- (1974) Europe-Blossoms —Poetry
- (1974) My California Redwoods —Poetry
- (1974) The Inner Promise: Paths to Self-Perfection —Lectures; Poetry
- (1974) Matsyendranath and Gorakshanath: Two Spiritual Lions —Plays
- (1974) God's New Philosophy —Short stories
- (1974) The Body, Humanity's Fortress —Answers
- (1974) Gopal's Eternal Brother and Other Stories for Children —Short stories
- (1974) Perfection-World —Answers
- (1974) Fortune-Philosophy —Aphorisms
- (1974) The Ambition-Deer —Short stories
- (1974) Life-Enquiry and Self-Discovery —Answers
- (1974) Earth's Cry Meets Heaven's Smile, part 1 —Answers
- (1974) Earth's Cry Meets Heaven's Smile, part 2 —Answers
- (1974) Gratitude-Sky and Ingratitude-Sea —Short stories
- (1974) The Tears of Nation-Hearts —Talks
- (1974) The Summits of God-Life: Samadhi and Siddhi —Discourses; Answers
- (1974) Lightless Soldiers Fail —Short stories
- (1974) Mind-Confusion and Heart-Illumination, part 1 —Answers
- (1974) Mind-Confusion and Heart-Illumination, part 2 —Answers
- (1974) A Yogi's Justice, an Avatar's Justice and God's Justice —Short stories
- (1974) A Galaxy of Beauty's Stars —Answers
- (1974) Illumination-Fruits —Commentary
- (1974) The Journey of Silver Dreams —Answers
- (1974) Earth's Dream-Boat Sails —Answers
- (1974) Supreme, Teach Me How to Cry —Songs
- (1974) Art's Life and the Soul's Light —Discourses; Answers
- (1974) Aspiration-Plants —Discourses
- (1974) A Hundred Years From Now —Discourses
- (1974) My Rose Petals, part 3 —Lectures
- (1974) Canada Aspires, Canada Receives, Canada Achieves, part 1 —Answers
- (1974) Canada Aspires, Canada Receives, Canada Achieves, part 2 —Answers
- (1974) Life-Tree Leaves —Discourses
- (1974) Purity-River Wins —Answers
- (1974) Aspiration-Flames —Answers
- (1974) Purity: Divinity's Little Sister —Answers
- (1974) Cry Within, Yours Is the Goal —Discourses
- (1974) My Rose Petals, part 4 —Lectures
- (1974) Is God Really Partial? —Short stories
- (1974) Eternity's Soul-Bird, part 1 —Answers
- (1974) Eternity's Soul-Bird, part 2 —Answers
- (1974) I Am Telling You a Great Secret: You Are a Fantastic Dream of God —Conversations
- (1974) Prayer-World, Mantra-World and Japa-World —Answers
- (1974) God the Supreme Musician —Discourses
- (1974) Realisation-Soul and Manifestation-Goal —Answers
- (1974) The Astral Journey —Short stories
- (1974) Meditation: Man's Choice and God's Voice, part 1 —Answers
- (1974) Meditation: Man's Choice and God's Voice, part 2 —Answers
- (1974) Meditation: Humanity's Race and Divinity's Grace, part 1 —Answers
- (1974) Meditation: Humanity's Race and Divinity's Grace, part 2 —Answers
- (1974) The Dance of the Cosmic Gods —Discourses
- (1974) Surrender's Unlimited Power —Discourses
- (1974) God the Supreme Humourist, part 1 —Answers; Poetry
- (1974) Problems! Problems! Are They Really Problems? Part 1 —Answers
- (1974) Problems! Problems! Are They Really Problems? Part 2 —Answers
- (1974) A God-Lover's Earth-Heaven-Life, part 1 —Answers
- (1974) My Self-Giving Is My God-Becoming —Answers
- (1974) A Galaxy of Saints —Short stories
- (1974) At the Doors of Time and Delight Opportunity Knocks —Answers
- (1974) Consciousness: God-Journey to Man, Man-Journey to God —Answers
- (1974) God-Life: Is It a Far Cry? —Answers
- (1974) The Height of Silence and the Might of Sound —Discourses; Answers
- (1974) The Hunger of Darkness and the Feast of Light, part 1 —Answers
- (1974) The Hunger of Darkness and the Feast of Light, part 2 —Answers
- (1974) The Illumination of Life-Clouds, part 1 —Answers
- (1974) The Illumination of Life-Clouds, part 2 —Answers
- (1974) The Master's Self-Appointed Emissary —Short stories
- (1974) Meditation: God Speaks and I Listen, part 1 —Answers
- (1974) Meditation: God Speaks and I Listen, part 2 —Answers
- (1974) Meditation: God's Blessing-Assurance —Answers
- (1974) Meditation: God's Duty and Man's Beauty —Answers
- (1974) Service-Boat and Love-Boatman, part 1 —Answers
- (1974) Service-Boat and Love-Boatman, part 2 —Answers
- (1974) Sleep: Death's Little Sister —Answers; Poetry
- (1974) Three Strangling Sisters: Fear, Jealousy and Insecurity —Discourses
- (1974) Two Devouring Brothers: Doubt and Ego —Answers
- (1974) The Vision of God's Dawn —Discourses
- (1974) Light-Delight-Journeys —Poetry; Commentary
- (1974) My Canadian Fruits —Poetry
- (1974) Immortality's Dance —Poetry
- (1974) Giving and Becoming —Poetry
- (1974) Eternity's Silence-Heart —Poetry
- (1974) The Prayer of the Sky —Poetry
- (1974) God's Vision-Promise —Poetry
- (1975) Transformation-Night. Immortality's Dawn —Answers
- (1975) The Silence-Song —Poetry
- (1975) Lord, Receive This Little Undying Cry —Poetry
- (1975) Lord, I Ask You for One Favour —Poetry
- (1975) I Need Only God —Poetry
- (1975) God-Journey's Perfection-Return —Answers
- (1975) When God-Love Descends —Poetry
- (1975) Lord, I Need You —Poetry
- (1975) Fourteen American Mothers and Fourteen American Daughters with Sri Chinmoy —Talks; Answers
- (1975) Flame-Waves, part 01 —Answers
- (1975) Flame-Waves, part 02 —Answers
- (1975) Flame-Waves, part 03 —Answers
- (1975) Flame-Waves, part 04 —Answers
- (1975) Flame-Waves, part 05 —Answers
- (1975) My Life-Tree —Poetry
- (1975) My Promise to God —Poetry
- (1975) When I Left God in Heaven —Poetry
- (1975) Beauty-Drops —Poetry; Commentary
- (1975) Yesterday I Was a Crying Dream —Poetry
- (1975) Dreams That Fly —Poetry
- (1975) Fifty Freedom-Boats to One Golden Shore, part 5 —Lectures
- (1975) Fifty Freedom-Boats to One Golden Shore, part 6 —Lectures
- (1975) Earth-Bound Journey and Heaven-Bound Journey —Lectures
- (1975) This Is God's Home —Poetry
- (1975) Brother Jesus —Poetry
- (1975) The Sacred Fire —Plays
- (1975) Supreme, Teach Me How to Surrender —Songs
- (1975) I Need My Country: Beauty's Soul —Poetry
- (1975) Sound Becomes, Silence Is —Poetry
- (1975) I Love My Country: Purity's Body —Discourses
- (1975) Love-Power and Gratitude-Flower —Short stories
- (1975) Supreme, Make My Life a Gratitude-Flood —Songs
- (1975) Transcendence-Perfection —Poetry
- (1975) Pole-Star Promise-Light, part 1 —Songs
- (1975) Pole-Star Promise-Light, part 2 —Songs
- (1975) Pole-Star Promise-Light, part 3 —Songs
- (1975) Pole-Star Promise-Light, part 4 —Songs
- (1975) Silence-Seed and Sound-Fruit —Poetry; Commentary
- (1975) God-Compassion and God-Justice —Poetry
- (1975) Dependence and Assurance —Discourses
- (1975) The Garden of Love-Light, part 3 —Songs
- (1976) Two Divine Instruments: Master and Disciple —Discourses
- (1976) Surrender and Realisation —Talks
- (1976) The Inner Hunger —Discourses
- (1976) Union and Oneness —Poetry; Commentary
- (1976) Dedication-Drops —Poetry
- (1976) A Lost Friend —Short stories
- (1976) The Soul's Journey —Discourses
- (1976) Disciples' Love-Power —Short stories
- (1976) Illumination-Song and Liberation-Dance, part 1 —Songs
- (1976) Illumination-Song and Liberation-Dance, part 2 —Songs
- (1976) I Shall Forgive My Past Songbook —Songs
- (1976) The Bicentennial Flames at the UN —Answers
- (1976) Compassion-Father, Champion-Brother, Perfection-Friend —Tributes
- (1976) The Liberty Torch —Aphorisms
- (1976) They Came Only to Go. The birthless and deathless chronicles of Himalayan absurdity —Short stories (autobiographical)
- (1976) A God-Lover's Earth-Heaven-Life, part 2 —Answers
- (1976) A God-Lover's Earth-Heaven-Life, part 3 —Answers
- (1976) Spiritual Power, Occult Power and Will Power; Washington Lecture Series, part 1 —Lectures
- (1976) My Heart's Salutation to Australia, part 1 —Lectures; Answers
- (1976) Sri Chinmoy Speaks, part 01 —Lectures
- (1976) Nineteen American Mothers and Nineteen American Sons with Sri Chinmoy —Talks; Answers
- (1976) My Heart's Salutation to Australia, part 2 —Lectures; Answers
- (1976) Sri Chinmoy Speaks, part 02 —Lectures
- (1976) Sri Chinmoy Speaks, part 03 —Lectures
- (1976) Self-Discovery and World-Mastery —Lectures; Answers
- (1976) Illumination-Song and Liberation-Dance, part 3 —Songs (Bengali with translations)
- (1976) Sri Chinmoy Speaks, part 04 —Lectures; Answers
- (1976) Sri Chinmoy Speaks, part 05 —Talks; Answers
- (1976) Sri Chinmoy Speaks, part 06 —Talks; Answers
- (1976) Father's Day: Father with His European Children —Answers
- (1976) My Rose Petals, part 5 —Lectures; Answers
- (1976) Creation and Perfection —Talks; Answers
- (1976) My Rose Petals, part 6 —Lectures
- (1976) My Rose Petals, part 7 —Lectures
- (1976) Dipti Nivas —Answers
- (1976) Soulful Questions and Fruitful Answers —Answers
- (1976) Warriors of the Inner World —Lectures
- (1976) Flame-Waves, part 06 —Answers
- (1976) Flame-Waves, part 07 —Answers
- (1976) Flame-Waves, part 08 —Answers
- (1976) Union-Vision —Talks
- (1976) Justice-Light and Satisfaction-Delight —Answers
- (1976) Reality-Dream —Talks
- (1976) Perseverance and Aspiration —Talks
- (1976) Sri Chinmoy Speaks, part 10 —Lectures; Answers
- (1976) Aspiration-Tree —Answers
- (1977) Conversations with the Master —Answers
- (1977) Illumination-World —Talks; Answers
- (1977) U Thant: Divinity's Smile, Humanity's Cry —Talks; Interviews; Songs
- (1977) God and the Cosmic Game —Answers
- (1977) My Green Adoration-Gifts, part 1 —Songs (Bengali with translations)
- (1977) My Green Adoration-Gifts, part 2 —Songs (Bengali with translations)
- (1977) India and Her Miracle-Feast: Come and Enjoy Yourself. Part 1 - Traditional Stories about Troilanga Swami —Short stories
- (1977) India and Her Miracle-Feast: Come and Enjoy Yourself. Part 2 - Traditional Stories about Shyama Charan Lahiri —Short stories
- (1977) India and Her Miracle-Feast: Come and Enjoy Yourself. Part 3 - Traditional Stories about Gambhirananda —Short stories
- (1977) India and Her Miracle-Feast: Come and Enjoy Yourself. Part 4 - Traditional Stories about Bhaskarananda —Short stories
- (1977) The Meditation-World —Discourses; Answers
- (1977) India and Her Miracle-Feast: Come and Enjoy Yourself. Part 5 - Traditional Stories about Devadas Maharaj —Short stories
- (1977) India and Her Miracle-Feast: Come and Enjoy Yourself. Part 6 vol. 1 - Traditional Stories about Ramdas Kathiya Baba —Short stories
- (1977) India and Her Miracle-Feast: Come and Enjoy Yourself. Part 6 vol. 2 - Traditional Stories about Ramdas Kathiya Baba —Short stories
- (1977) The Soul and the Process of Reincarnation —Answers
- (1977) The Doubt-World —Discourses
- (1977) Selfless Service-Light —Answers
- (1977) The Significance of a Smile —Answers
- (1977) Obedience: A Supreme Virtue —Discourses; Answers
- (1977) Occultism and Mysticism —Answers
- (1977) God, Avatars and Yogis —Answers
- (1977) Experiences of the Higher Worlds —Answers
- (1977) Perfection and Transcendence —Discourses; Answers
- (1977) Transformation of the Ego —Answers
- (1977) Inner Progress and Satisfaction-Life —Discourses; Answers
- (1977) Miracles, Emanations and Dreams —Discourses; Answers
- (1977) Obedience or Oneness —Discourses; Answers
- (1977) Opportunity and Self-Transcendence —Discourses; Answers
- (1977) The Inner Journey —Answers
- (1977) Palmistry, Reincarnation and the Dream State —Discourses; Answers
- (1977) Inspiration-Garden and Aspiration-Leaves —Discourses; Answers
- (1977) Four Intimate Friends: Insincerity, Impurity, Doubt and Self-Indulgence —Answers
- (1977) Ego and Self-Complacency —Answers
- (1977) Politics and Spirituality: Can They Go Together? —Answers
- (1977) The Silent Mind —Talks
- (1977) The Spiritual Journey: Oneness in Diversity —Answers
- (1977) Aspiration-Glow and Dedication-Flow, part 1 —Answers
- (1977) Aspiration-Glow and Dedication-Flow, part 2 —Answers
- (1977) A Twentieth Century Seeker —Discourses; Answers
- (1977) Soul-Education for the Family-World —Answers
- (1977) Reincarnation and Evolution —Answers
- (1977) The Hour of Meditation —Answers
- (1977) The Master's Inner Life —Discourses; Answers
- (1977) Great Masters and the Cosmic Gods —Answers
- (1977) The Soul's Evolution —Lectures; Answers
- (1977) Aspiration and God's Hour —Answers
- (1977) Transcendence of the Past —Answers
- (1977) The Mind and the Heart in Meditation —Answers
- (1977) God the Supreme Humourist, part 2 —Answers
- (1977) A Soulful Cry Versus a Fruitful Smile —Poetry (rhyming)
- (1977) Smile of the Beyond —Answers
- (1977) Everest-Aspiration, part 1 —Discourses; Lectures
- (1977) Everest-Aspiration, part 2 —Discourses; Lectures
- (1977) Everest-Aspiration, part 3 —Discourses; Lectures
- (1977) Everest-Aspiration, part 4 —Discourses; Lectures
- (1978) Journey's Goal Songbook, part 01 —Songs (English)
- (1978) Journey's Goal Songbook, part 02 —Songs (English)
- (1978) From the Source to the Source —Poetry (rhyming)
- (1978) Illumination-Song and Liberation-Dance, part 6 - Songbook —Songs (Bengali)
- (1978) Freedom-Heights, part 1 —Songs (Bengali)
- (1978) Patience-Groves, songbook —Songs (Bengali with translations)
- (1978) Journey's Goal Songbook, part 03 —Songs (Bengali)
- (1978) Journey's Goal Songbook, part 04 —Songs (Bengali)
- (1978) Journey's Goal Songbook, part 05 —Songs (Bengali)
- (1977) Two God-Servers and Man-Lovers Parts 1 & 2 —Tributes
- (1978) A Soulful Tribute to the Secretary-General: the Pilot Supreme of the UN —Tributes
- (1978) Bela Chale Jai —Songs (Bengali with translations)
- (1978) The Seeker's Mind —Talks
- (1978) United Nations Meditation-Flowers and To-morrow's Noon —Talks; Discourses; Poetry
- (1978) Flame-Waves, part 09 —Answers
- (1978) Flame-Waves, part 10 —Answers
- (1978) Flame-Waves, part 11 —Answers
- (1978) Flame-Waves, part 12 —Answers
- (1979) Einstein: Scientist-Sage, Brother of Atom-Universe —Discourses; Poetry; Songs
- (1979) Great Indian Meals: Divinely Delicious and Supremely Nourishing, part 01 —Short stories
- (1979) Great Indian Meals: Divinely Delicious and Supremely Nourishing, part 02 —Short stories
- (1979) Great Indian Meals: Divinely Delicious and Supremely Nourishing, part 03 —Short stories
- (1979) Great Indian Meals: Divinely Delicious and Supremely Nourishing, part 04 —Short stories
- (1979) Run and Become. Become and Run, part 01 —Short stories (autobiographical)
- (1979) The Heart-Home of the Immortals —Songs (English)
- (1979) The Avatars and Masters —Answers
- (1979) Great Indian Meals: Divinely Delicious and Supremely Nourishing, part 05 —Short stories
- (1979) Great Indian Meals: Divinely Delicious and Supremely Nourishing, part 06 —Short stories
- (1979) Great Indian Meals: Divinely Delicious and Supremely Nourishing, part 07 —Short stories
- (1979) Great Indian Meals: Divinely Delicious and Supremely Nourishing, part 08 —Short stories
- (1979) Great Indian Meals: Divinely Delicious and Supremely Nourishing, part 09 —Short stories
- (1979) Ten Thousand Flower-Flames, part 001 —Aphorisms
- (1979) Ten Thousand Flower-Flames, part 002 —Aphorisms
- (1979) Ten Thousand Flower-Flames, part 003 —Aphorisms
- (1979) Ten Thousand Flower-Flames, part 004 —Aphorisms
- (1979) Ten Thousand Flower-Flames, part 005 —Aphorisms
- (1979) Wisdom-Waves in New-York, part 1 —Lectures
- (1979) Wisdom-Waves in New-York, part 2 —Lectures
- (1979) Run and Become. Become and Run, part 02 —Short stories (autobiographical)
- (1979) Three Soulful Prayers —Poetry
- (1979) You and I Are God —Poetry
- (1979) Perfection in the Head-World —Talks; Answers
- (1979) The Jewel of Humility —Answers
- (1978) Service-Heroes —Answers
- (1979) Four Hundred Gratitude-Flower-Hearts —Poetry; Talks; Aphorisms; Commentary
- (1979) Blue Waves of the Ocean-Source —Songs
- (1979) Philosophy, Religion and Yoga —Answers
- (1979) The Disciples' Freedom —Answers
- (1980) Secrets of the Inner World —Discourses; Answers
- (1980) O My Pilot Beloved —Prayers
- (1980) The Vision-Sky of California —Lectures
- (1980) Mother-Land, Father-Land, I Love You —Songs (Bengali with translations)
- (1980) Emil Zatopek: Earth's Tearing Cry, Heaven's Beaming Smile —Tributes
- (1980) Run and Become. Become and Run, part 03 —Short stories (autobiographical)
- (1980) I Know Not Why —Songs (Bengali with translations)
- (1980) Ten Thousand Flower-Flames, part 006 —Aphorisms
- (1980) Earth's Cry Meets Heaven's Smile, part 3 —Answers
- (1980) Fountain-Art Song-Garland —Songs (Bengali with translations)
- (1980) Ten Thousand Flower-Flames, part 007 —Aphorisms
- (1981) Ten Thousand Flower-Flames, part 008 —Aphorisms
- (1981) Ten Thousand Flower-Flames, part 009 —Aphorisms
- (1981) Ten Thousand Flower-Flames, part 010 —Aphorisms
- (1981) Ten Thousand Flower-Flames, part 011 —Aphorisms
- (1981) Ten Thousand Flower-Flames, part 012 —Aphorisms
- (1981) Ten Thousand Flower-Flames, part 013 —Aphorisms
- (1981) Ten Thousand Flower-Flames, part 014 —Aphorisms
- (1981) Ten Thousand Flower-Flames, part 015 —Aphorisms
- (1981) Ten Thousand Flower-Flames, part 016 —Aphorisms
- (1981) Journey's Goal Songbook, part 06 —Songs (English)
- (1981) Journey's Goal Songbook, part 07a —Songs (English)
- (1981) Journey's Goal Songbook, part 07b —Songs (English)
- (1981) Journey's Goal Songbook, part 08a —Songs (English)
- (1981) Journey's Goal Songbook, part 08b —Songs (English)
- (1981) Journey's Goal Songbook, part 09a —Songs (English)
- (1981) The Loser and the Winner —Poetry
- (1981) Ten Thousand Flower-Flames, part 017 —Aphorisms
- (1981) Ten Thousand Flower-Flames, part 018 —Aphorisms
- (1981) Journey's Goal Songbook, part 09b —Songs (Bengali)
- (1981) Journey's Goal Songbook, part 10a —Songs (Bengali)
- (1981) Journey's Goal Songbook, part 10b —Songs (Bengali)
- (1981) Journey's Goal Songbook, part 11a —Songs (Bengali)
- (1981) Journey's Goal Songbook, part 11b —Songs (Bengali)
- (1981) Journey's Goal Songbook, part 12a —Songs (Bengali)
- (1981) Journey's Goal Songbook, part 12b —Songs (Bengali)
- (1981) Journey's Goal Songbook, part 13 —Songs (Bengali)
- (1981) Run and Become. Become and Run, part 04 —Short stories (autobiographical)
- (1981) Chandelier, part 1 —Songs
- (1981) Chandelier, part 2 —Songs
- (1981) Illumination-Song and Liberation-Dance, part 7 - Songbook —Songs (Bengali with translations)
- (1981) Illumination-Song and Liberation-Dance, part 8 - Songbook —Songs (Bengali with translations)
- (1981) My Fifty Gratitude-Summers —Poetry
- (1981) Ten Thousand Flower-Flames, part 019 —Aphorisms
- (1981) Ten Thousand Flower-Flames, part 020 —Aphorisms
- (1981) Salutations, Numbers 1 - 4 —Short stories (autobiographical)
- (1981) Salutations, Numbers 5 - 8 —Short stories (autobiographical)
- (1981) Run and Become. Become and Run, part 05 —Short stories (autobiographical)
- (1981) Flame-Roads —Songs (Bengali with translations)
- (1981) Ten Thousand Flower-Flames, part 021 —Aphorisms
- (1981) The Sailor and the Parrot —Short stories
- (1981) India and Her Miracle-Feast: Come and Enjoy Yourself. Part 7 - Traditional Stories about Swami Nigamananda —Short stories
- (1981) India and Her Miracle-Feast: Come and Enjoy Yourself. Part 8 - Traditional Stories about Bama Kshepa —Short stories
- (1981) India and Her Miracle-Feast: Come and Enjoy Yourself. Part 9 - Traditional Stories about Balananda —Short stories
- (1981) The Mushroom and the Umbrella —Short stories
- (1981) Big Pot, Little Pot —Short stories
- (1981) Two Brothers: Madal and Chinmoy, part 1 —Conversations
- (1981) Ten Thousand Flower-Flames, part 022 —Aphorisms
- (1981) Run and Become. Become and Run, part 06 —Short stories (autobiographical)
- (1981) Is Your Mind Ready to Cry? Is Your Heart Ready to Smile? Part 01 —Short stories
- (1982) Run and Become. Become and Run, part 07 —Short stories (autobiographical)
- (1982) Is Your Mind Ready to Cry? Is Your Heart Ready to Smile? Part 02 —Short stories
- (1982) Is Your Mind Ready to Cry? Is Your Heart Ready to Smile? Part 03 —Short stories
- (1982) Is Your Mind Ready to Cry? Is Your Heart Ready to Smile? Part 04 —Short stories
- (1982) Is Your Mind Ready to Cry? Is Your Heart Ready to Smile? Part 05 —Short stories
- (1982) Is Your Mind Ready to Cry? Is Your Heart Ready to Smile? Part 06 —Short stories
- (1982) Is Your Mind Ready to Cry? Is Your Heart Ready to Smile? Part 07 —Short stories
- (1982) Is Your Mind Ready to Cry? Is Your Heart Ready to Smile? Part 08 —Short stories
- (1982) Is Your Mind Ready to Cry? Is Your Heart Ready to Smile? Part 09 —Short stories
- (1982) Is Your Mind Ready to Cry? Is Your Heart Ready to Smile? Part 10 —Short stories
- (1982) Great Indian Meals: Divinely Delicious and Supremely Nourishing, part 10 —Short stories
- (1982) Ten Thousand Flower-Flames, part 023 —Aphorisms
- (1982) Ten Thousand Flower-Flames, part 024 —Aphorisms
- (1982) Ten Thousand Flower-Flames, part 025 —Aphorisms
- (1982) Ten Thousand Flower-Flames, part 026 —Aphorisms
- (1982) Ten Thousand Flower-Flames, part 027 —Aphorisms
- (1982) Ten Thousand Flower-Flames, part 028 —Aphorisms
- (1982) Ten Thousand Flower-Flames, part 029 —Aphorisms
- (1982) Ten Thousand Flower-Flames, part 030 —Aphorisms
- (1982) Ten Thousand Flower-Flames, part 031 —Aphorisms
- (1982) Two Brothers: Madal and Chinmoy, part 2 —Conversations
- (1982) Two Brothers: Madal and Chinmoy, part 3 —Conversations
- (1982) Ten Thousand Flower-Flames, part 032 —Aphorisms
- (1982) Run and Become. Become and Run, part 08 —Short stories (autobiographical)
- (1982) Aurora-Flora —Poetry
- (1982) What I Need from God —Lectures
- (1982) Prayer-Plants —Prayers
- (1982) Tomorrow's Dawn —Aphorisms; Poetry
- (1982) Climbing Flames —Songs
- (1982) Run and Become. Become and Run, Songbook —Songs
- (1982) Illumination-Experiences on Indian Soil, part 1 —Short stories
- (1982) Illumination-Experiences on Indian Soil, part 2 —Short stories
- (1982) Illumination-Experiences on Indian Soil, part 3 —Short stories
- (1982) Ten Thousand Flower-Flames, part 033 —Aphorisms
- (1982) Sound and Silence, part 1 —Lectures; Answers
- (1982) Sound and Silence, part 2 —Lectures; Answers
- (1982) I Am Ready —Poetry
- (1982) Ten Thousand Flower-Flames, part 033 —Aphorisms
- (1982) Ten Thousand Flower-Flames, part 034 —Aphorisms
- (1982) Ten Thousand Flower-Flames, part 035 —Aphorisms
- (1982) Ten Thousand Flower-Flames, part 036 —Aphorisms
- (1982) Ten Thousand Flower-Flames, part 037 —Aphorisms
- (1982) Ten Thousand Flower-Flames, part 038 —Aphorisms
- (1982) Ten Thousand Flower-Flames, part 039 —Aphorisms
- (1982) Ten Thousand Flower-Flames, part 040 —Aphorisms
- (1982) Ten Thousand Flower-Flames, part 041 —Aphorisms
- (1982) Ten Thousand Flower-Flames, part 042 —Aphorisms
- (1982) Ten Thousand Flower-Flames, part 043 —Aphorisms
- (1982) Ten Thousand Flower-Flames, part 044 —Aphorisms
- (1982) Ten Thousand Flower-Flames, part 045 —Aphorisms
- (1982) I Meditate So That —Poetry
- (1982) Ten Thousand Flower-Flames, part 046 —Aphorisms
- (1982) Ten Thousand Flower-Flames, part 047 —Aphorisms
- (1982) Ten Thousand Flower-Flames, part 048 —Aphorisms
- (1983) Run and Become. Become and Run, part 09 —Short stories (autobiographical)
- (1983) Ten Thousand Flower-Flames, part 049 —Aphorisms
- (1983) Ten Thousand Flower-Flames, part 050 —Aphorisms
- (1983) My Heart's Thirty-One Sacred Secrets —Poetry; Aphorisms
- (1983) Ten Thousand Flower-Flames, part 051 —Aphorisms
- (1983) Ten Thousand Flower-Flames, part 052 —Aphorisms
- (1983) Run and Become. Become and Run, part 10 —Short stories (autobiographical)
- (1983) Ten Thousand Flower-Flames, part 053 —Aphorisms
- (1983) Ten Thousand Flower-Flames, part 054 —Aphorisms
- (1983) Ten Thousand Flower-Flames, part 055 —Aphorisms
- (1983) Ten Thousand Flower-Flames, part 056 —Aphorisms
- (1983) Ten Thousand Flower-Flames, part 057 —Aphorisms
- (1983) Ten Thousand Flower-Flames, part 058 —Aphorisms
- (1983) Ten Thousand Flower-Flames, part 059 —Aphorisms
- (1983) Ten Thousand Flower-Flames, part 060 —Aphorisms
- (1983) Ten Thousand Flower-Flames, part 061 —Aphorisms
- (1983) Ten Thousand Flower-Flames, part 062 —Aphorisms
- (1983) Ten Thousand Flower-Flames, part 063 —Aphorisms
- (1983) Ten Thousand Flower-Flames, part 064 —Aphorisms
- (1983) Ten Thousand Flower-Flames, part 065 —Aphorisms
- (1983) Ten Thousand Flower-Flames, part 066 —Aphorisms
- (1983) Ten Thousand Flower-Flames, part 067 —Aphorisms
- (1983) Ten Thousand Flower-Flames, part 068 —Aphorisms
- (1983) Ten Thousand Flower-Flames, part 069 —Aphorisms
- (1983) Ten Thousand Flower-Flames, part 070 —Aphorisms
- (1983) Consciousness-Sky Songbook —Songs
- (1983) To-morrow's Shore —Songs (Bengali with translations)
- (1983) Satisfaction-Blossoms Songbook —Songs (Bengali)
- (1983) Ten Thousand Flower-Flames, part 071 —Aphorisms
- (1983) Ten Thousand Flower-Flames, part 072 —Aphorisms
- (1983) Ten Thousand Flower-Flames, part 073 —Aphorisms
- (1983) Ten Thousand Flower-Flames, part 074 —Aphorisms
- (1983) Ten Thousand Flower-Flames, part 075 —Aphorisms
- (1983) Ten Thousand Flower-Flames, part 076 —Aphorisms
- (1983) Ten Thousand Flower-Flames, part 077 —Aphorisms
- (1983) Ten Thousand Flower-Flames, part 078 —Aphorisms
- (1983) Ten Thousand Flower-Flames, part 080 —Aphorisms
- (1983) Ten Thousand Flower-Flames, part 082 —Aphorisms
- (1983) Ten Thousand Flower-Flames, part 083 —Aphorisms
- (1983) Ten Thousand Flower-Flames, part 084 —Aphorisms
- (1983) Ten Thousand Flower-Flames, part 085 —Aphorisms
- (1983) Ten Thousand Flower-Flames, part 086 —Aphorisms
- (1983) Ten Thousand Flower-Flames, part 087 —Aphorisms
- (1983) Ten Thousand Flower-Flames, part 088 —Aphorisms
- (1983) Ten Thousand Flower-Flames, part 089 —Aphorisms
- (1983) Ten Thousand Flower-Flames, part 090 —Aphorisms
- (1983) Ten Thousand Flower-Flames, part 091 —Aphorisms
- (1983) Ten Thousand Flower-Flames, part 092 —Aphorisms
- (1983) Ten Thousand Flower-Flames, part 093 —Aphorisms
- (1983) Sri Chinmoy with His Himalayan Champion-Coach: Payton Jordan —Interviews
- (1983) Ten Thousand Flower-Flames, part 094 —Aphorisms
- (1983) Ten Thousand Flower-Flames, part 095 —Aphorisms
- (1983) Ten Thousand Flower-Flames, part 096 —Aphorisms
- (1983) Ten Thousand Flower-Flames, part 097 —Aphorisms
- (1983) Ten Thousand Flower-Flames, part 098 —Aphorisms
- (1983) Ten Thousand Flower-Flames, part 099 —Aphorisms
- (1983) Ten Thousand Flower-Flames, part 100 —Aphorisms
- (1983) Twenty-Seven Thousand Aspiration-Plants, part 001 —Aphorisms
- (1983) Twenty-Seven Thousand Aspiration-Plants, part 002 —Aphorisms
- (1983) Twenty-Seven Thousand Aspiration-Plants, part 003 —Aphorisms
- (1983) Twenty-Seven Thousand Aspiration-Plants, part 004 —Aphorisms
- (1983) Twenty-Seven Thousand Aspiration-Plants, part 005 —Aphorisms
- (1983) Twenty-Seven Thousand Aspiration-Plants, part 006 —Aphorisms
- (1983) Twenty-Seven Thousand Aspiration-Plants, part 007 —Aphorisms
- (1983) Twenty-Seven Thousand Aspiration-Plants, part 008 —Aphorisms
- (1983) Twenty-Seven Thousand Aspiration-Plants, part 009 —Aphorisms
- (1983) Twenty-Seven Thousand Aspiration-Plants, part 010 —Aphorisms
- (1983) Twenty-Seven Thousand Aspiration-Plants, part 011 —Aphorisms
- (1983) Twenty-Seven Thousand Aspiration-Plants, part 012 —Aphorisms
- (1983) Twenty-Seven Thousand Aspiration-Plants, part 013 —Aphorisms
- (1983) Twenty-Seven Thousand Aspiration-Plants, part 014 —Aphorisms
- (1983) Twenty-Seven Thousand Aspiration-Plants, part 015 —Aphorisms
- (1983) Twenty-Seven Thousand Aspiration-Plants, part 016 —Aphorisms
- (1983) Twenty-Seven Thousand Aspiration-Plants, part 017 —Aphorisms
- (1983) Twenty-Seven Thousand Aspiration-Plants, part 018 —Aphorisms
- (1983) Twenty-Seven Thousand Aspiration-Plants, part 019 —Aphorisms
- (1983) Twenty-Seven Thousand Aspiration-Plants, part 020 —Aphorisms
- (1983) Run and Become. Become and Run, part 11 —Short stories (autobiographical)
- (1983) Run and Become. Become and Run, part 12 —Short stories (autobiographical)
- (1983) Run and Become. Become and Run, part 13 —Short stories (autobiographical)
- (1983) The Songs of God-Souls —Songs (Bengali with translations)
- (1983) I Pray So That —Poetry
- (1984) Twenty-Seven Thousand Aspiration-Plants, part 021 —Aphorisms
- (1984) Twenty-Seven Thousand Aspiration-Plants, part 022 —Aphorisms
- (1984) Twenty-Seven Thousand Aspiration-Plants, part 023 —Aphorisms
- (1984) Twenty-Seven Thousand Aspiration-Plants, part 024 —Aphorisms
- (1984) Twenty-Seven Thousand Aspiration-Plants, part 025 —Aphorisms
- (1984) Twenty-Seven Thousand Aspiration-Plants, part 026 —Aphorisms
- (1984) Twenty-Seven Thousand Aspiration-Plants, part 027 —Aphorisms
- (1984) Twenty-Seven Thousand Aspiration-Plants, part 028 —Aphorisms
- (1984) Twenty-Seven Thousand Aspiration-Plants, part 029 —Aphorisms
- (1984) Twenty-Seven Thousand Aspiration-Plants, part 030 —Aphorisms
- (1984) Twenty-Seven Thousand Aspiration-Plants, part 031 —Aphorisms
- (1984) Twenty-Seven Thousand Aspiration-Plants, part 032 —Aphorisms
- (1984) Twenty-Seven Thousand Aspiration-Plants, part 033 —Aphorisms
- (1984) Twenty-Seven Thousand Aspiration-Plants, part 034 —Aphorisms
- (1984) Twenty-Seven Thousand Aspiration-Plants, part 035 —Aphorisms
- (1984) Twenty-Seven Thousand Aspiration-Plants, part 036 —Aphorisms
- (1984) Twenty-Seven Thousand Aspiration-Plants, part 037 —Aphorisms
- (1984) Twenty-Seven Thousand Aspiration-Plants, part 038 —Aphorisms
- (1984) Twenty-Seven Thousand Aspiration-Plants, part 039 —Aphorisms
- (1984) Twenty-Seven Thousand Aspiration-Plants, part 041 —Aphorisms
- (1984) Twenty-Seven Thousand Aspiration-Plants, part 042 —Aphorisms
- (1984) Twenty-Seven Thousand Aspiration-Plants, part 043 —Aphorisms
- (1984) Twenty-Seven Thousand Aspiration-Plants, part 044 —Aphorisms
- (1984) Twenty-Seven Thousand Aspiration-Plants, part 045 —Aphorisms
- (1984) Twenty-Seven Thousand Aspiration-Plants, part 046 —Aphorisms
- (1984) Twenty-Seven Thousand Aspiration-Plants, part 047 —Aphorisms
- (1984) Twenty-Seven Thousand Aspiration-Plants, part 048 —Aphorisms
- (1984) Twenty-Seven Thousand Aspiration-Plants, part 049 —Aphorisms
- (1984) Twenty-Seven Thousand Aspiration-Plants, part 050 —Aphorisms
- (1984) Twenty-Seven Thousand Aspiration-Plants, part 051 —Aphorisms
- (1984) Twenty-Seven Thousand Aspiration-Plants, part 052 —Aphorisms
- (1984) Twenty-Seven Thousand Aspiration-Plants, part 053 —Aphorisms
- (1984) Twenty-Seven Thousand Aspiration-Plants, part 054 —Aphorisms
- (1984) Twenty-Seven Thousand Aspiration-Plants, part 055 —Aphorisms
- (1984) Twenty-Seven Thousand Aspiration-Plants, part 056 —Aphorisms
- (1984) Twenty-Seven Thousand Aspiration-Plants, part 057 —Aphorisms
- (1984) Twenty-Seven Thousand Aspiration-Plants, part 058 —Aphorisms
- (1984) Never Say No —Songs (english with translations)
- (1984) Twenty-Seven Thousand Aspiration-Plants, part 059 —Aphorisms
- (1984) Twenty-Seven Thousand Aspiration-Plants, part 060 —Aphorisms
- (1984) Twenty-Seven Thousand Aspiration-Plants, part 061 —Aphorisms
- (1984) Twenty-Seven Thousand Aspiration-Plants, part 062 —Aphorisms
- (1984) Twenty-Seven Thousand Aspiration-Plants, part 063 —Aphorisms
- (1984) The Outer Running and the Inner Running —Discourses; Talks; Answers
- (1984) Twenty-Seven Thousand Aspiration-Plants, part 064 —Aphorisms
- (1984) Twenty-Seven Thousand Aspiration-Plants, part 065 —Aphorisms
- (1984) Twenty-Seven Thousand Aspiration-Plants, part 066 —Aphorisms
- (1984) Twenty-Seven Thousand Aspiration-Plants, part 067 —Aphorisms
- (1984) Twenty-Seven Thousand Aspiration-Plants, part 068 —Aphorisms
- (1984) Twenty-Seven Thousand Aspiration-Plants, part 069 —Aphorisms
- (1984) Twenty-Seven Thousand Aspiration-Plants, part 070 —Aphorisms
- (1984) Twenty-Seven Thousand Aspiration-Plants, part 071 —Aphorisms
- (1984) Twenty-Seven Thousand Aspiration-Plants, part 072 —Aphorisms
- (1984) Twenty-Seven Thousand Aspiration-Plants, part 073 —Aphorisms
- (1984) Twenty-Seven Thousand Aspiration-Plants, part 074 —Aphorisms
- (1984) Twenty-Seven Thousand Aspiration-Plants, part 075 —Aphorisms
- (1984) Twenty-Seven Thousand Aspiration-Plants, part 076 —Aphorisms
- (1984) Twenty-Seven Thousand Aspiration-Plants, part 077 —Aphorisms
- (1984) Twenty-Seven Thousand Aspiration-Plants, part 078 —Aphorisms
- (1984) Twenty-Seven Thousand Aspiration-Plants, part 079 —Aphorisms
- (1984) Journey's Ecstasy Songbook —Songs (Bengali with translations)
- (1984) Twenty-Seven Thousand Aspiration-Plants, part 080 —Aphorisms
- (1984) Twenty-Seven Thousand Aspiration-Plants, part 081 —Aphorisms
- (1984) Twenty-Seven Thousand Aspiration-Plants, part 082 —Aphorisms
- (1984) Twenty-Seven Thousand Aspiration-Plants, part 083 —Aphorisms
- (1984) Twenty-Seven Thousand Aspiration-Plants, part 084 —Aphorisms
- (1984) Twenty-Seven Thousand Aspiration-Plants, part 085 —Aphorisms
- (1984) Twenty-Seven Thousand Aspiration-Plants, part 086 —Aphorisms
- (1984) Twenty-Seven Thousand Aspiration-Plants, part 087 —Aphorisms
- (1984) Twenty-Seven Thousand Aspiration-Plants, part 088 —Aphorisms
- (1984) Twenty-Seven Thousand Aspiration-Plants, part 089 —Aphorisms
- (1984) Twenty-Seven Thousand Aspiration-Plants, part 090 —Aphorisms
- (1984) Nolini: Sri Aurobindo's Unparalleled Friend-Son-Disciple —Tributes
- (1984) Twenty-Seven Thousand Aspiration-Plants, part 091 —Aphorisms
- (1984) Twenty-Seven Thousand Aspiration-Plants, part 092 —Aphorisms
- (1984) Twenty-Seven Thousand Aspiration-Plants, part 093 —Aphorisms
- (1984) Twenty-Seven Thousand Aspiration-Plants, part 094 —Aphorisms
- (1984) Twenty-Seven Thousand Aspiration-Plants, part 095 —Aphorisms
- (1984) Twenty-Seven Thousand Aspiration-Plants, part 096 —Aphorisms
- (1984) Twenty-Seven Thousand Aspiration-Plants, part 097 —Aphorisms
- (1984) Twenty-Seven Thousand Aspiration-Plants, part 098 —Aphorisms
- (1984) Twenty-Seven Thousand Aspiration-Plants, part 099 —Aphorisms
- (1984) Twenty-Seven Thousand Aspiration-Plants, part 100 —Aphorisms
- (1985) Twenty-Seven Thousand Aspiration-Plants, part 101 —Aphorisms
- (1985) Run and Become. Become and Run, part 14 —Short stories (autobiographical)
- (1985) Run and Become. Become and Run, part 15 —Short stories (autobiographical)
- (1985) Run and Become. Become and Run, part 16 —Short stories (autobiographical)
- (1985) Twenty-Seven Thousand Aspiration-Plants, part 102 —Aphorisms
- (1985) Master and the Disciple —Talks
- (1985) Salutations, Numbers 9-12 —Short stories (autobiographical)
- (1985) Twenty-Seven Thousand Aspiration-Plants, part 103 —Aphorisms
- (1985) Soul-Illumination-Shrine, Body-Preparation-Temple, part 1 —Answers
- (1985) I Love Shopping, part 1 —Short stories (autobiographical)
- (1986) Run and Become. Become and Run, part 17 —Short stories (autobiographical)
- (1986) Japan, My Life Bows to Your Heart —Commentary
- (1986) The World-Experience-Tree-Climber, part 1 —Short stories (autobiographical)
- (1986) I Love Shopping, part 2 —Short stories (autobiographical)
- (1986) Twenty-Seven Thousand Aspiration-Plants, part 104 —Aphorisms
- (1986) My God-Hunger-Dreams —Poetry
- (1986) Twenty-Seven Thousand Aspiration-Plants, part 105 —Aphorisms
- (1986) Twenty-Seven Thousand Aspiration-Plants, part 106 —Aphorisms
- (1986) Body, Heart and Soul. One-Arm Lift Anniversary —Answers
- (1986) I Pray before I Lift, I Meditate While I Lift, I Offer My Gratitude-Cries and Gratitude-Smiles —Prayers
- (1986) My Weightlifting Tears and Smiles, part 1 —Short stories (autobiographical)
- (1986) My Weightlifting Tears and Smiles, part 2 —Short stories (autobiographical)
- (1987) Twenty-Seven Thousand Aspiration-Plants, part 107 —Aphorisms
- (1987) Twenty-Seven Thousand Aspiration-Plants, part 108 —Aphorisms
- (1987) Twenty-Seven Thousand Aspiration-Plants, part 109 —Aphorisms
- (1987) Twenty-Seven Thousand Aspiration-Plants, part 110 —Aphorisms
- (1987) Twenty-Seven Thousand Aspiration-Plants, part 111 —Aphorisms
- (1987) Twenty-Seven Thousand Aspiration-Plants, part 112 —Aphorisms
- (1987) Twenty-Seven Thousand Aspiration-Plants, part 113 —Aphorisms
- (1987) Twenty-Seven Thousand Aspiration-Plants, part 114 —Aphorisms
- (1987) Khama Karo —Discourses; Songs (Bengali with translations)
- (1987) Simplicity, Sincerity, Purity and Divinity —Answers
- (1987) Flower-Flames, part 1 —Songs (English)
- (1987) Seventy Rosebuds —Songs (Bengali with translations)
- (1987) Niagara Falls Versus... —Answers
- (1987) A Seeker Is a Singer —Discourses; Talks; Answers; Poetry
- (1987) The Giver and the Receiver —Lectures
- (1987) The Quintessence of Knowledge-Sun —Answers
- (1987) Four Hundred Blue-Green-White-Red Song Birds, part 1 —Songs (Bengali and English)
- (1987) Four Hundred Blue-Green-White-Red Song Birds, part 2 —Songs (Bengali and English)
- (1988) Relaxation-Secrets for the Pressured Mind —Jokes
- (1988) O My Mind —Poetry
- (1988) Oneness-Reality and Perfection-Divinity —Lectures; Answers
- (1988) Ten Divine Secrets —Talks; Answers
- (1988) Twenty-Seven Thousand Aspiration-Plants, part 115 —Aphorisms
- (1988) Fifty-Four Morning Prayer-Cries and Morning Meditation-Smiles —Prayers
- (1988) The Inner World and the Outer World —Talks; Interviews
- (1988) Flower-Flames, part 2 —Songs (English)
- (1988) The Eternal Journey —Answers; Poetry
- (1988) Twenty-Seven Thousand Aspiration-Plants, part 116 —Aphorisms
- (1988) Twenty-Seven Thousand Aspiration-Plants, part 117 —Aphorisms
- (1988) Twenty-Seven Thousand Aspiration-Plants, part 118 —Aphorisms
- (1988) Twenty-Seven Thousand Aspiration-Plants, part 119 —Aphorisms
- (1988) Twenty-Seven Thousand Aspiration-Plants, part 120 —Aphorisms
- (1988) O My Heart —Poetry
- (1988) Twenty-Seven Thousand Aspiration-Plants, part 121 —Aphorisms
- (1988) Lifting Up the World with a Oneness-Heart, 100 lift book —Tributes
- (1988) Come, My Non-English Friends! Let Us Together Climb Up the English Himalayas, part 1 —Poetry; Commentary
- (1989) Twenty-Seven Thousand Aspiration-Plants, part 122 —Aphorisms
- (1989) Twenty-Seven Thousand Aspiration-Plants, part 123 —Aphorisms
- (1989) Twenty-Seven Thousand Aspiration-Plants, part 124 —Aphorisms
- (1989) Twenty-Seven Thousand Aspiration-Plants, part 125 —Aphorisms
- (1989) The World-Experience-Tree-Climber, part 2 —Short stories (autobiographical)
- (1989) The World-Experience-Tree-Climber, part 3 —Short stories (autobiographical)
- (1989) Twenty-Seven Thousand Aspiration-Plants, part 126 —Aphorisms
- (1989) Song-Flowers, part 1 —Songs (English)
- (1989) Song-Flowers, part 2 —Songs (English)
- (1989) Song-Flowers, part 3 —Songs (English)
- (1989) My Silver Jubilee. Rainbow-Heart-Whispers —Poetry; Songs (English)
- (1989) Twenty-Seven Thousand Aspiration-Plants, part 127 —Aphorisms
- (1989) No Problem! I Am My Gorgeous Smile —Songs (English)
- (1989) Song-Flowers, part 4 —Songs (English)
- (1989) Vive La France —Songs (Bengali with translations)
- (1989) I Am a Fool Songbook —Songs (English)
- (1989) The God of the Mind —Poetry
- (1990) The God of the Mind (songbook) —Songs (English)
- (1990) Twenty-Seven Thousand Aspiration-Plants Songbook, part 1 —Songs (English)
- (1989) A Real Member of the United Nations —Aphorisms
- (1989) Perez de Cuellar: Immortality's Rainbow Peace —Tributes
- (1990) Twenty-Seven Thousand Aspiration-Plants, part 128 —Aphorisms
- (1990) Twenty-Seven Thousand Aspiration-Plants, part 129 —Aphorisms
- (1990) Twenty-Seven Thousand Aspiration-Plants, part 130 —Aphorisms
- (1989) Song-Flowers, part 5 —Songs (English)
- (1990) Twenty-Seven Thousand Aspiration-Plants, part 131 —Aphorisms
- (1990) God Is Kidnapped —Poetry
- (1990) Twenty-Seven Thousand Aspiration-Plants, part 132 —Aphorisms
- (1990) President Premadasa: Nectar-Bliss-Heart, Lion-Roar-Soul —Aphorisms
- (1990) Twenty-Seven Thousand Aspiration-Plants, part 133 —Aphorisms
- (1990) Twenty-Seven Thousand Aspiration-Plants, part 134 —Aphorisms
- (1990) Twenty-Seven Thousand Aspiration-Plants, part 135 —Aphorisms
- (1990) Twenty-Seven Thousand Aspiration-Plants, part 136 —Aphorisms
- (1990) My Lord Supreme, Do You Have a Moment? —Poetry
- (1990) Gorbachev: the Master-Key of the Universal Heart —Tributes
- (1990) I Fly in the Heart-Sky of My Dear Supreme —Songs (English)
- (1990) I Want to Be a Twenty-Four Hour God-Dreamer —Songs (English)
- (1990) I Shall Give You My Flower-Heart —Songs (Bengali and English)
- (1990) One Germany, One Soul, One Heart —Songs
- (1990) Silence speaks, part 1 —Poetry (rhyming)
- (1990) Jesus the Seeker, Christ the Saviour —Songs (Bengali with translations)
- (1990) Silence speaks, part 2 —Poetry (rhyming)
- (1991) Twenty-Seven Thousand Aspiration-Plants, part 137 —Aphorisms
- (1991) Twenty-Seven Thousand Aspiration-Plants, part 138 —Aphorisms
- (1991) Twenty-Seven Thousand Aspiration-Plants, part 139 —Aphorisms
- (1991) Twenty-Seven Thousand Aspiration-Plants, part 140 —Aphorisms
- (1991) Twenty-Seven Thousand Aspiration-Plants, part 141 —Aphorisms
- (1991) Twenty-Seven Thousand Aspiration-Plants, part 142 —Aphorisms
- (1991) Twenty-Seven Thousand Aspiration-Plants, part 143 —Aphorisms
- (1991) Twenty-Seven Thousand Aspiration-Plants, part 144 —Aphorisms
- (1991) Twenty-Seven Thousand Aspiration-Plants, part 145 —Aphorisms
- (1991) Twenty-Seven Thousand Aspiration-Plants, part 146 —Aphorisms
- (1991) Twenty-Seven Thousand Aspiration-Plants, part 147 —Aphorisms
- (1991) Twenty-Seven Thousand Aspiration-Plants, part 148 —Aphorisms
- (1991) Twenty-Seven Thousand Aspiration-Plants, part 149 —Aphorisms
- (1991) Twenty-Seven Thousand Aspiration-Plants, part 150 —Aphorisms
- (1991) Twenty-Seven Thousand Aspiration-Plants, part 151 —Aphorisms
- (1991) Concentration, Meditation, Contemplation —Poetry
- (1991) Twenty-Seven Thousand Aspiration-Plants, part 152 —Aphorisms
- (1991) Twenty-Seven Thousand Aspiration-Plants, part 152 —Aphorisms
- (1991) Twenty-Seven Thousand Aspiration-Plants, part 153 —Aphorisms
- (1991) Twenty-Seven Thousand Aspiration-Plants, part 154 —Aphorisms
- (1991) Twenty-Seven Thousand Aspiration-Plants, part 155 —Aphorisms
- (1991) Twenty-Seven Thousand Aspiration-Plants, part 156 —Aphorisms
- (1991) Twenty-Seven Thousand Aspiration-Plants, part 157 —Aphorisms
- (1991) Twenty-Seven Thousand Aspiration-Plants, part 158 —Aphorisms
- (1991) My Child, You and I are in the same Boat —Poetry
- (1991) Laugh, Laugh! Mind-Burden Gone —Jokes
- (1991) My Twenty-Seven Hungry Prayer-Tears —Poetry
- (1991) God Minus —Poetry
- (1991) God Plus —Poetry
- (1991) Twenty-Seven Heart-Fragrance-Dreams —Poetry
- (1991) My Life-Boat's Dream-Reality-Shore —Poetry
- (1991) Twenty-Seven Thousand Aspiration-Plants, part 159 —Aphorisms
- (1991) Twenty-Seven Thousand Aspiration-Plants, part 160 —Aphorisms
- (1991) Twenty-Seven Thousand Aspiration-Plants, part 161 —Aphorisms
- (1991) Song-Flowers, part 6 —Songs (English)
- (1991) Song-Flowers, part 7 —Songs (English)
- (1991) Twenty-Seven Thousand Aspiration-Plants, part 162 —Aphorisms
- (1991) Twenty-Seven Thousand Aspiration-Plants, part 163 —Aphorisms
- (1991) My Gratitude-Flowers for the United Nations —Songs (English)
- (1991) Russia and Russia's God-Blossoming Heart —Answers
- (1991) War: Man's Abysmal Abyss-Plunge, part 1 —Poetry
- (1991) War: Man's Abysmal Abyss-Plunge, part 2 —Poetry
- (1991) Twenty-Seven Thousand Aspiration-Plants, part 164 —Aphorisms
- (1991) Every Day a New Chance —Poetry
- (1991) Each Hour Is a God-Hour —Poetry
- (1991) European Poem-Blossoms —Poetry
- (1991) Carl Lewis: The Champion Inner Runner —Tributes
- (1991) Carl Lewis: The Champion Inner Runner (extended edition) —Tributes
- (1992) Twenty-Seven Thousand Aspiration-Plants, part 165 —Aphorisms
- (1992) Twenty-Seven Thousand Aspiration-Plants, part 166 —Aphorisms
- (1992) Twenty-Seven Thousand Aspiration-Plants, part 167 —Aphorisms
- (1992) Japan: The Morning Sun of the World —Songs (Bengali with translations)
- (1992) Morning Invites My Heart. Evening Invites My Life —Poetry
- (1992) The Core of India's Light, part 1 —Commentary; Aphorisms
- (1992) The Core of India's Light, part 2 —Commentary; Aphorisms
- (1992) The Core of India's Light, part 3 —Commentary; Aphorisms
- (1992) The Core of India's Light, part 4 —Commentary; Aphorisms
- (1992) Sixty-One Gratitude-Blossoms from the World-Head-Home-Garden —Tributes
- (1992) Twenty-Seven Thousand Aspiration-Plants, part 168 —Aphorisms
- (1992) Twenty-Seven Thousand Aspiration-Plants, part 169 —Aphorisms
- (1992) Peace: God's Fragrance-Heart, part 1 —Poetry
- (1992) Peace: God's Fragrance-Heart, part 2 —Poetry
- (1992) Compassion-Forgiveness Songs on Mother Kali —Songs (Bengali with translations)
- (1992) My Song-River-Heart Songbook, part 1 —Songs (English)
- (1992) My God-Master —Poetry
- (1992) I Need This Book —Commentary; Aphorisms
- (1992) Compassion-Sea and Satisfaction-Waves —Discourses
- (1992) Silver Thought-Waves, part 1 —Commentary
- (1992) Silver Thought-Waves, part 2 —Commentary
- (1992) Song-Flowers, part 8 —Songs (English)
- (1992) My Song-River-Heart Songbook, part 2 —Songs (English)
- (1992) May My Heart-Flower Smile Never Fade Away —Songs (English)
- (1992) I Prayerfully Bow... —Songs (sanskrit with translations)
- (1992) Sixty-One Three Line Songs (61 Bengali Songs) —Songs (Bengali)
- (1992) Ami Nil Akasher Nil Pakhi —Songs (Bengali with translations)
- (1992) Twenty-Four Hindu Proverbs Songbook —Songs (English)
- (1992) Ten Thousand Flower-Flames, songbook, part 03 —Songs (English)
- (1992) My Father Shashi Kumar Ghose: Affection-Life, Compassion-Heart, Illumination-Mind —Short stories (autobiographical)
- (1992) Twenty-Seven Thousand Aspiration-Plants, part 170 —Aphorisms
- (1992) Twenty-Seven Thousand Aspiration-Plants, part 171 —Aphorisms
- (1992) Beauty-Discovery —Poetry
- (1992) Twenty-Seven Thousand Aspiration-Plants, part 172 —Aphorisms
- (1992) Twenty-Seven Thousand Aspiration-Plants, part 173 —Aphorisms
- (1992) Twenty-Seven Thousand Aspiration-Plants, part 174 —Aphorisms
- (1992) I Know Why I Am Helpless —Poetry
- (1992) Beautiful Is My Whispering Soul —Poetry
- (1992) Friendship-Birds Fly —Poetry
- (1992) God the Eye and God the Heart —Poetry
- (1992) Twenty-Seven Thousand Aspiration-Plants, part 175 —Aphorisms
- (1992) I Have a Beautiful Smile, I Am a Soulful Cry —Aphorisms
- (1992) The Unreal Heights of Real Absurdities —Answers
- (1992) My Lord, Make Me Your Happiness-Child —Poetry
- (1992) Morning Prayers. Poems on War —Poetry
- (1992) Kalpana Rathe Charibo —Songs (Bengali)
- (1993) This Heart Is Your Heart —Songs (English)
- (1992) My Lord Supreme, I Am Falling Asleep —Poetry
- (1993) Silence Speaks Songbook —Songs (English)
- (1992) Inner Peace and World Peace —Talks; Interviews
- (1992) Truth's Fountain-Melody —Discourses; Interviews
- (1992) A Life of Blossoming Love —Discourses; Interviews
- (1992) Yesterday. Today. Tomorrow. —Poetry
- (1992) My Mind-Confusion Out. My Mind-Illumination In —Poetry
- (1992) I Am Sure —Poetry
- (1992) My God-Prayers and My God-Meditations —Poetry
- (1992) The Oneness-Heart-University —Poetry
- (1993) Somebody Has to Listen —Poetry
- (1992) My God-Commitments —Poetry
- (1992) The Beginning and the Arriving —Poetry
- (1993) My Gratitude-Tears and God's Satisfaction-Smiles —Poetry
- (1993) My Gratitude-Heart-Garden —Poetry
- (1993) A Love-Bathed Heart —Poetry
- (1993) My Eagerness-Heart —Poetry
- (1993) My Perfection-Promise to God —Poetry
- (1993) My Bondage-Life Is My Self-Invention —Poetry
- (1993) O My Heart's Silence-Shore —Songs (Bengali and English)
- (1993) My Surrender-Life-Joy —Songs (Bengali)
- (1993) Love Compassion Forgiveness —Poetry; Tributes
- (1993) Twenty-Seven Thousand Aspiration-Plants, part 176 —Aphorisms
- (1993) Twenty-Seven Thousand Aspiration-Plants, part 177 —Aphorisms
- (1993) Twenty-Seven Thousand Aspiration-Plants, part 178 —Aphorisms
- (1993) Twenty-Seven Thousand Aspiration-Plants, part 179 —Aphorisms
- (1993) Twenty-Seven Thousand Aspiration-Plants, part 180 —Aphorisms
- (1993) Twenty-Seven Thousand Aspiration-Plants, part 181 —Aphorisms
- (1993) Twenty-Seven Thousand Aspiration-Plants, part 182 —Aphorisms
- (1993) Twenty-Seven Thousand Aspiration-Plants, part 183 —Aphorisms
- (1993) Ten Thousand Flower-Flames, songbook, part 04 —Songs (English)
- (1993) O Forgiveness-Ocean —Songs (Bengali and English)
- (1993) Come, My Non-English Friends! Songbook, part 1 —Songs (Bengali and English)
- (1993) Ten Thousand Flower-Flames, songbook, part 05 —Songs (English)
- (1993) God the Mother and God the Father —Poetry
- (1993) Matter and Spirit —Poetry
- (1993) Are You Looking for Your Heart? Here, Come and Take It! —Songs (English)
- (1993) I Implore Your Compassion-Light —Songs (Bengali and English)
- (1993) Japan: Soul-Beauty's Heart-Garden —Commentary
- (1993) Lord Buddha's Compassion-Hand —Commentary
- (1993) Sri Chinmoy with His Upper-Storey-Weak Students —Jokes; Conversations
- (1993) Meetings with Luminaries in the Philippines —Tributes
- (1993) Peace-Blossoms on the Philippine Life-Tree —Tributes; Answers
- (1993) You Are Your Life's Progress-Joy-Drum —Answers
- (1993) Gratitude-Flower-Hearts —Poetry
- (1993) Twenty-Seven Thousand Aspiration-Plants, part 184 —Aphorisms
- (1993) Twenty-Seven Thousand Aspiration-Plants, part 185 —Aphorisms
- (1993) Twenty-Seven Thousand Aspiration-Plants, part 186 —Aphorisms
- (1993) My Heart Shall Give a Oneness-Feast —Answers
- (1993) Poetry: My Rainbow-Heart-Dreams —Discourses; Talks; Poetry
- (1993) The Inner Role of the United Nations —Talks; Interviews
- (1993) Twenty-Seven Thousand Aspiration-Plants, part 187 —Aphorisms
- (1993) The Master Speaks to the Puerto-Rican Disciples, 1966-1972 —Talks
- (1993) Twenty-Seven Thousand Aspiration-Plants, part 188 —Aphorisms
- (1993) Aspiration-Body, Illumination-Soul, part 1 —Answers
- (1993) My Little Heart Is God's Big Hand —Songs (English)
- (1993) Twenty-Seven Thousand Aspiration-Plants, part 189 —Aphorisms
- (1993) Two Brothers: Madal and Chinmoy, part 4 —Commentary; Conversations
- (1993) O My Heart, Where Are You? —Poetry
- (1993) Immediately Start! —Poetry
- (1993) Immediately Stop! —Poetry
- (1993) Aspiration-Body, Illumination-Soul, part 2 —Answers
- (1993) Immediately Start Again! —Poetry
- (1993) Twenty-Seven Thousand Aspiration-Plants, part 190 —Aphorisms
- (1993) Day and Night I Shall Bow —Songs (Bengali and English)
- (1993) I Long to Quench My Heart-Thirst —Songs (Bengali and English)
- (1993) Vivekananda: An Ancient Silence-Heart and A Modern Dynamism-Life —Tributes
- (1993) Related Word Songs —Songs (Bengali)
- (1993) Friendship Songs —Songs (English)
- (1993) Silence Calls Me —Songs (English)
- (1993) In the New Year, a New Dawn —Songs (Bengali and English)
- (1993) Chinese Proverbs —Songs (English)
- (1993) Twenty-Seven Thousand Aspiration-Plants, part 191 —Aphorisms
- (1993) Imagination versus Illumination —Jokes; Conversations
- (1993) Sri Chinmoy in the Amusement Park —Conversations
- (1993) Vivekananda: Divinity's Soul-Rainbow and Humanity's Heart-Blossom —Tributes
- (1993) Twenty-Seven Thousand Aspiration-Plants, part 192 —Aphorisms
- (1993) Twenty-Seven Thousand Aspiration-Plants, part 193 —Aphorisms
- (1993) Twenty-Seven Thousand Aspiration-Plants, part 194 —Aphorisms
- (1993) Twenty-Seven Thousand Aspiration-Plants, part 195 —Aphorisms
- (1993) Kritagyatar Agni Shikha —Songs (Bengali)
- (1993) Tumi Habe Mor Sathi —Songs (Bengali)
- (1993) Twenty-Seven Thousand Aspiration-Plants, part 196 —Aphorisms
- (1993) The World-Experience-Tree-Climber, part 4 —Short stories (autobiographical)
- (1993) The World-Experience-Tree-Climber, part 5 —Short stories (autobiographical)
- (1993) The World-Experience-Tree-Climber, part 6 —Short stories (autobiographical)
- (1993) Twenty-Seven Thousand Aspiration-Plants, part 197 —Aphorisms
- (1993) Twenty-Seven Thousand Aspiration-Plants, part 198 —Aphorisms
- (1993) The World-Experience-Tree-Climber, part 7 —Short stories (autobiographical)
- (1993) Silence speaks, part 3 —Poetry (rhyming)
- (1993) Twenty-Seven Thousand Aspiration-Plants, part 199 —Aphorisms
- (1993) Captain, My Captain —
- (1993) Twenty-Seven Thousand Aspiration-Plants, part 200 —Aphorisms
- (1994) Twenty-Five Aspiration-Flames —Poetry
- (1994) Music: Ecstasy's Heart-Hunger —Tributes
- (1993) Silence speaks, part 4 —Poetry (rhyming)
- (1994) To the Streaming Tears of My Mother's Heart and to the Brimming Smiles of My Mother's Soul —Short stories (autobiographical)
- (1993) Silence speaks, part 5 —Poetry (rhyming)
- (1994) My Mother's Prayer-Tears —Songs (Bengali with translations)
- (1994) Sukher Dine Dukher Rate Songbook —Songs (Bengali)
- (1994) Twenty-Seven Thousand Aspiration-Plants Songbook, part 2 —Songs (English)
- (1993) Come, My Non-English Friends! Songbook, part 2 —Songs (Bengali and English)
- (1994) The Goal Is Won; Songbook —Songs (English)
- (1994) I Love Shopping, part 3 —Short stories (autobiographical)
- (1994) I Love Shopping, part 4 —Short stories (autobiographical)
- (1994) I Love Shopping, part 5 —Short stories (autobiographical)
- (1994) Silence speaks, part 6 —Poetry (rhyming)
- (1994) I Play Tennis Every Day —Discourses; Talks; Poetry
- (1994) New Year's Messages 1966-1994 —Poetry
- (1994) World-Destruction: Never! Impossible! part 1 —Answers
- (1994) World-Destruction: Never! Impossible! part 2 —Answers
- (1994) My Lord, I Pray to You —Prayers
- (1994) My Soul Is Free —Poetry
- (1994) Fast, Faster, Fastest Progress —Poetry
- (1994) Twenty-Seven Thousand Aspiration-Plants, part 201 —Aphorisms
- (1994) I Am My Life's God-Hunger-Heart, part 1 —Poetry
- (1994) I Am My Life's God-Hunger-Heart, part 2 —Poetry
- (1994) I Am My Life's God-Hunger-Heart, part 3 —Poetry
- (1994) I Am My Life's God-Hunger-Heart, part 4 —Poetry
- (1994) My Heart's Peace-Offering —Poetry
- (1994) The Soul's Special Promise, part 1 —Answers
- (1994) God's Compassion-Eye and My Happiness-Heart —Poetry
- (1994) Success-Jumps, Progress-Songs —Poetry
- (1994) Command from God the Justice, Whisper from God the Compassion —Poetry
- (1994) God's Heart I Desire, God's Feet I Choose —Poetry
- (1994) Heaven's Ecstasy-Flames —Poetry
- (1994) Disobedience, Time Is Up! —Poetry
- (1994) Twenty-Seven Thousand Aspiration-Plants, part 202 —Aphorisms
- (1994) My Jealousy Is My Madness-Burden —Poetry
- (1994) Impurity: The Mad Elephant Mental Asylum —Poetry
- (1994) Idleness: The Loneliest Existence in the Entire World —Poetry
- (1994) Twenty-Seven Thousand Aspiration-Plants, part 203 —Aphorisms
- (1994) Silence speaks, part 7 —Poetry (rhyming)
- (1994) Twenty-Seven Thousand Aspiration-Plants, part 204 —Aphorisms
- (1994) No Unreachable Goal —Poetry
- (1994) Silence speaks, part 8 —Poetry (rhyming)
- (1994) Twenty-Seven Thousand Aspiration-Plants, part 205 —Aphorisms
- (1994) Twenty-Seven Thousand Aspiration-Plants, part 206 —Aphorisms
- (1994) Twenty-Seven Thousand Aspiration-Plants, part 207 —Aphorisms
- (1994) Silence speaks, part 9 —Poetry (rhyming)
- (1994) Twenty-Seven Thousand Aspiration-Plants, part 208 —Aphorisms
- (1994) Twenty-Seven Thousand Aspiration-Plants, part 209 —Aphorisms
- (1994) Twenty-Seven Thousand Aspiration-Plants, part 210 —Aphorisms
- (1994) Twenty-Seven Thousand Aspiration-Plants, part 211 —Aphorisms
- (1994) A Seeker's Heart-Song —Answers
- (1994) My God-Obedience —Poetry
- (1994) Twenty-Seven Thousand Aspiration-Plants, part 212 —Aphorisms
- (1994) Uchcha Asha Purna Karo —Songs (Bengali)
- (1994) Asha Bane Ghure Berai. I Am Roaming in the Sweet Hope-Forest —Songs (Bengali)
- (1994) Jakhan Habe Swarga Rajya —Songs (Bengali)
- (1994) No Return On My God-Destination-Road —Poetry
- (1994) Say a Final Farewell to Your Mind's Bondage-Life —Poetry
- (1994) Take Your God-Search Seriously —Poetry
- (1994) My Life's Sixty-Three Heart-Blossoms —Poetry
- (1994) Obedience: Heart-Fragrance —Short stories
- (1994) My Heart-Melody —Answers
- (1994) Twenty-Seven Thousand Aspiration-Plants, part 213 —Aphorisms
- (1994) Twenty-Seven Thousand Aspiration-Plants, part 214 —Aphorisms
- (1994) Twenty-Seven Thousand Aspiration-Plants, part 215 —Aphorisms
- (1994) Twenty-Seven Thousand Aspiration-Plants, part 216 —Aphorisms
- (1994) More Talks to the Puerto Rican Disciples (1970-1973) —Answers
- (1994) Twenty-Seven Thousand Aspiration-Plants, part 217 —Aphorisms
- (1994) Whatever You Want, God Gives —Short stories
- (1994) Twenty-Seven Thousand Aspiration-Plants, part 218 —Aphorisms
- (1994) My Aspiration-Heart's Country-Life-Salutations —Songs (Bengali with translations)
- (1994) Peace-Blossom-Fragrance, part 1 —Poetry
- (1994) Peace-Blossom-Fragrance, part 2 —Poetry
- (1994) Peace-Blossom-Fragrance, part 3 —Poetry
- (1994) Peace-Blossom-Fragrance, part 4 —Poetry
- (1994) Peace-Blossom-Fragrance, part 5 —Poetry
- (1994) Peace-Blossom-Fragrance, part 6 —Poetry
- (1994) Peace-Blossom-Fragrance, part 7 —Poetry
- (1995) Mahatma Gandhi: The Heart of Life —Tributes
- (1995) Twenty-Seven Thousand Aspiration-Plants, part 219 —Aphorisms
- (1995) Twenty-Seven Thousand Aspiration-Plants, part 220 —Aphorisms
- (1995) Twenty-Seven Thousand Aspiration-Plants, part 221 —Aphorisms
- (1995) Peace: God's Heart-Home, part 1 —Poetry
- (1995) Sri Chinmoy Visits India —Short stories (autobiographical)
- (1995) Asha Phul, part 1 —Songs (Bengali)
- (1995) Asha Phul, part 2 —Songs (Bengali)
- (1995) Asha Phul, part 3 —Songs (Bengali)
- (1995) Asha Phul, part 4 —Songs (Bengali)
- (1995) Bhorer Pakhi, part 1 —Songs (Bengali)
- (1995) Bhorer Pakhi, part 2 —Songs (Bengali)
- (1995) Greet the Morning with Your Heart's Aspiration-Cry —Songs (English)
- (1995) Sri Chinmoy Answers, part 01 —Answers
- (1995) The Earth-Illumination-Trumpets of Divinity's Home, part 1 —Short stories
- (1995) The Earth-Illumination-Trumpets of Divinity's Home, part 2 —Short stories
- (1995) Peace: God's Heart-Home, part 2 —Poetry
- (1995) The Earth-Illumination-Trumpets of Divinity's Home, part 3 —Short stories
- (1995) Sri Chinmoy Answers, part 02 —Answers
- (1995) The Secret of Beauty —Poetry
- (1995) Angels —Poetry
- (1995) Friendship —Poetry
- (1995) Meditate On —Aphorisms
- (1995) Sun-Moon-Stars —Poetry
- (1995) August,15th,1945, Songbook —Songs
- (1995) Peace —Poetry
- (1995) My Rose-Road. My Lotus-Home —Poetry
- (1995) Twenty-Seven Thousand Aspiration-Plants, part 222 —Aphorisms
- (1995) Twenty-Seven Thousand Aspiration-Plants, part 223 —Aphorisms
- (1995) Volcano-Agonies of the Seekers —Poetry
- (1995) Twenty-Seven Thousand Aspiration-Plants, part 224 —Aphorisms
- (1995) My Silence-Heart-Blossoms 1 - January - February —Poetry (rhyming)
- (1995) My Silence-Heart-Blossoms 2 - March - April —Poetry (rhyming)
- (1995) My Silence-Heart-Blossoms 3 - May June —Poetry (rhyming)
- (1995) Jibaner Bhor —Songs (Bengali with translations)
- (1995) Gahite Chahi Kali Mayer Gan —Songs (Bengali with translations)
- (1995) Asim Pather Jatri Ami —Songs (Bengali)
- (1995) Swapane Amije Birer Ketan Songbook —Songs (Bengali)
- (1995) Tomar Bani Karbo Prachar —Songs (Bengali)
- (1995) Sri Chinmoy Answers, part 03 —Answers
- (1995) Sri Chinmoy Answers, part 04 —Answers
- (1995) My God-Obedience, My God-Disobedience —Songs (English)
- (1995) Four Summit-Height-Melodies Meet with Sri Chinmoy —Tributes; Songs
- (1995) My Meditation-Service at the UN for 25 Years —Answers
- (1995) Twenty-Seven Thousand Aspiration-Plants, part 225 —Aphorisms
- (1995) My Express Visit to India —Short stories (autobiographical)
- (1995) Sri Chinmoy Answers, part 05 —Answers
- (1995) Sri Chinmoy Answers, part 06 —Answers
- (1995) In the Amusement-Enlightenment Heart-Garden of the Lord Supreme —Conversations
- (1995) Sacred Rock Welcomes Sri Chinmoy —Tributes
- (1982) Illumination-Experiences on Indian Soil, part 4 —Short stories
- (1995) Jago Jago Hiya Pakhi —Songs (Bengali and English)
- (1995) Fourteen Hour Peace Concert. Immensity-Peace-Sea-Experiences. Sublimity-Peace-Sky-Realisations: A Fourteen-Hour Peace Concert —Poetry
- (1995) Impossibility Bows —Songs (Bengali)
- (1995) Chinta Dhabal Chinta Amal —Songs (English)
- (1995) I Pray to Become My Heart-Flower —Songs (English)
- (1995) Lord, I Thank You for Your Smile —Songs (English)
- (1996) Power and Love —Poetry
- (1996) Twenty-Seven Thousand Aspiration-Plants, part 226 —Aphorisms
- (1996) Today —Poetry
- (1996) Sri Chinmoy with Four African Peace Immortals —Tributes
- (1996) Twenty-Seven Thousand Aspiration-Plants, part 227 —Aphorisms
- (1996) Twenty-Seven Thousand Aspiration-Plants, part 228 —Aphorisms
- (1996) Hiyar Pradip Ke Jalabe —Songs (Bengali with translations)
- (1996) Kandte Habe Shishur Mato —Songs (Bengali with translations)
- (1996) O Kanaiya Jiban Tari Songbook —Songs (English)
- (1996) Every Day My Gratitude-Heart —Songs (English)
- (1996) Maner Bane Asha Kusum Phutbena —Songs (Bengali)
- (1996) Run and Become. Become and Run, part 18 —Short stories (autobiographical)
- (1996) My Morning Begins —Poetry
- (1996) Run and Become. Become and Run, part 19 —Short stories (autobiographical)
- (1996) Twenty-Seven Thousand Aspiration-Plants, part 229 —Aphorisms
- (1996) Love, Joy, Happiness —Poetry
- (1996) Twenty-Seven Thousand Aspiration-Plants, part 230 —Aphorisms
- (1996) Twenty-Seven Thousand Aspiration-Plants, part 231 —Aphorisms
- (1996) Twenty-Seven Thousand Aspiration-Plants, part 232 —Aphorisms
- (1996) My Evening Descends —Poetry
- (1996) Twenty-Seven Thousand Aspiration-Plants, part 233 —Aphorisms
- (1996) Twenty-Seven Thousand Aspiration-Plants, part 234 —Aphorisms
- (1996) Atma Bhola Shiber Matan —Songs (Bengali)
- (1996) Two God-Amusement-Rivals: My Heart-Song-Beauty and My Life-Dance-Fragrance, part 01 —Poetry
- (1996) Two God-Amusement-Rivals: My Heart-Song-Beauty and My Life-Dance-Fragrance, part 02 —Poetry
- (1996) Two God-Amusement-Rivals: My Heart-Song-Beauty and My Life-Dance-Fragrance, part 03 —Poetry
- (1996) Two God-Amusement-Rivals: My Heart-Song-Beauty and My Life-Dance-Fragrance, part 04 —Poetry
- (1996) Two God-Amusement-Rivals: My Heart-Song-Beauty and My Life-Dance-Fragrance, part 05 —Poetry
- (1996) Two God-Amusement-Rivals: My Heart-Song-Beauty and My Life-Dance-Fragrance, part 06 —Poetry
- (1996) Two God-Amusement-Rivals: My Heart-Song-Beauty and My Life-Dance-Fragrance, part 07 —Poetry
- (1996) Two God-Amusement-Rivals: My Heart-Song-Beauty and My Life-Dance-Fragrance, part 08 —Poetry
- (1996) Two God-Amusement-Rivals: My Heart-Song-Beauty and My Life-Dance-Fragrance, part 09 —Poetry
- (1996) Two God-Amusement-Rivals: My Heart-Song-Beauty and My Life-Dance-Fragrance, part 10 —Poetry
- (1996) Two God-Amusement-Rivals: My Heart-Song-Beauty and My Life-Dance-Fragrance, part 11 —Poetry
- (1996) Two God-Amusement-Rivals: My Heart-Song-Beauty and My Life-Dance-Fragrance, part 12 —Poetry
- (1996) Two God-Amusement-Rivals: My Heart-Song-Beauty and My Life-Dance-Fragrance, part 13 —Poetry
- (1996) August,15th, 1945 —Poetry
- (1996) Compassion-Affection versus Deception-Destruction —Short stories (autobiographical)
- (1996) Bishwa Bidhata Kemane Dekhibo —Songs (Bengali and English)
- (1996) Shanti Lagi Kandbo Ami —Songs (Bengali and English)
- (1996) Sri Chinmoy's Rainbow-Dreams, part 2 —Tributes
- (1996) My Prayerful Salutations to the United Nations —Tributes
- (1996) Sri Chinmoy Answers, part 07 —Answers
- (1996) My Consulate Years —Short stories (autobiographical)
- (1996) Twenty-Seven Thousand Aspiration-Plants, part 235 —Aphorisms
- (1996) Science and Nature —Poetry
- (1997) Mother, Your 50th Independence-Anniversary! I Am Come. Ever in Your Eternity's Cries And Your Infinity's Smiles, Subhas —Tributes
- (1997) I Go Out. I Come In —Poetry
- (1997) Twenty-Seven Thousand Aspiration-Plants, part 236 —Aphorisms
- (1996) Sri Chinmoy Answers, part 08 —Answers
- (1997) Children: God's Dream-Blossoms —Answers
- (1997) Twenty-Seven Thousand Aspiration-Plants, part 237 —Aphorisms
- (1997) Professor-Children: God's Reality-Fruits —Answers
- (1997) Twenty-Seven Thousand Aspiration-Plants Songbook, part 3 —Songs (English)
- (1997) All Can Be Done If the God-Touch Is There —Songs (English)
- (1997) Today God Is Occupying Himself Only with My Life —Songs (English)
- (1997) My God-Master Is the Only One —Songs (English)
- (1997) The Golden Shore Will Beckon You —Songs (Bengali)
- (1997) Namo Namo Namo Shakti Pujari —Songs (Bengali with translations)
- (1997) A Heart of Peace —Songs (English)
- (1997) My Hope Is The Life Of My Heart —Songs (Bengali with translations)
- (1997) Twenty-Seven Thousand Aspiration-Plants, part 238 —Aphorisms
- (1997) Tree of Life —Poetry
- (1997) Dreams —Poetry
- (1997) Morning Dawn —Poetry
- (1997) Alpha and Omega —Songs (Bengali with translations)
- (1997) Mother Teresa: Humanity's Flower-Heart, Divinity's Fragrance-Soul, part 1 —Tributes
- (1997) Twenty-Seven Thousand Aspiration-Plants, part 239 —Aphorisms
- (1997) India, My India. Mother India's Summit-Prides —Poetry
- (1997) Shivaji —Short stories
- (1997) Khudra Amire Bhulite Chahlbo Bhulite —Songs (Bengali)
- (1997) O My Peace-Nest-Heart —Songs (Bengali)
- (1997) God's Perfection-Choice —Songs (Bengali)
- (1997) Mother India: Infinity's Beauty-Eye, Immortality's Fragrance-Heart —Poetry
- (1997) Diana, Princess of Wales, Empress of the World —Tributes
- (1997) Mother Teresa: Humanity's Flower-Heart, Divinity's Fragrance-Soul, part 2 —Tributes
- (1997) Mother Teresa: Humanity's Flower-Heart, Divinity's Fragrance-Soul, part 3 —Tributes
- (1997) Twenty-Seven Thousand Aspiration-Plants, part 240 —Aphorisms
- (1997) A God-Intoxicated Man, Nag Mahashay —Short stories
- (1997) Amusement I Enjoy, Enlightenment I Study, part 1 —Short stories
- (1997) Amusement I Enjoy, Enlightenment I Study, part 2 —Short stories
- (1997) Amusement I Enjoy, Enlightenment I Study, part 3 —Short stories
- (1997) Sri Aurobindo: The Infinite —Discourses; Poetry
- (1997) All Can Be Done If the God-Touch Is There (extended edition) —Tributes
- (1997) Sri Aurobindo: Divinity's Seer-Light —Tributes
- (1997) I Go Out, I Come In (extended edition) —Poetry
- (1998) Amusement I Enjoy, Enlightenment I Study, part 4 —Short stories
- (1998) Amusement I Enjoy, Enlightenment I Study, part 5 —Short stories
- (1998) Amusement I Enjoy, Enlightenment I Study, part 6 —Short stories
- (1998) Amusement I Enjoy, Enlightenment I Study, part 7 —Short stories
- (1998) Twenty-Seven Thousand Aspiration-Plants, part 241 —Aphorisms
- (1998) Twenty-Seven Thousand Aspiration-Plants, part 242 —Aphorisms
- (1998) Twenty-Seven Thousand Aspiration-Plants, part 243 —Aphorisms
- (1998) Twenty-Seven Thousand Aspiration-Plants, part 244 —Aphorisms
- (1998) Twenty-Seven Thousand Aspiration-Plants, part 245 —Aphorisms
- (1998) Twenty-Seven Thousand Aspiration-Plants, part 246 —Aphorisms
- (1998) Seventy-Seven Thousand Service-Trees, part 01 —Aphorisms
- (1998) God's Greatness and God's Goodness —Poetry
- (1998) I Am Flying and Flying and Flying... —Poetry
- (1998) Seventy-Seven Thousand Service-Trees, part 02 —Aphorisms
- (1998) The Difference Between God and Me —Poetry
- (1998) A True Disciple —Poetry
- (1998) Twenty-Seven Thousand Aspiration-Plants, part 247 —Aphorisms
- (1998) Twenty-Seven Thousand Aspiration-Plants, part 248 —Aphorisms
- (1998) Seventy-Seven Thousand Service-Trees, part 03 —Aphorisms
- (1998) My Lord's Lotus-Feet Versus My Devotion-Heart, part 1 —Poetry
- (1998) My Lord's Lotus-Feet Versus My Devotion-Heart, part 2 —Poetry
- (1998) Retirement Not Granted —Poetry
- (1998) Eso Eso Prabhu, part 1 —Songs (Bengali with translations)
- (1998) Twenty-Seven Thousand Aspiration-Plants, part 249 —Aphorisms
- (1998) Twenty-Seven Thousand Aspiration-Plants, part 250 —Aphorisms
- (1998) Seventy-Seven Thousand Service-Trees, part 04 —Aphorisms
- (1998) I Climb Up, I Fall Down —Poetry
- (1998) Vladimir Petrovsky, Builder of a New Heart-Firmament —Poetry
- (1998) Twenty-Seven Thousand Aspiration-Plants, part 251 —Aphorisms
- (1998) Twenty-Seven Thousand Aspiration-Plants, part 252 —Aphorisms
- (1998) Birthdays —Poetry
- (1998) Encouragement —Poetry
- (1998) Sympathy —Poetry
- (1998) Opportunity —Poetry
- (1998) Seventy-Seven Thousand Service-Trees, part 05 —Aphorisms
- (1998) Twenty-Seven Thousand Aspiration-Plants, part 253 —Aphorisms
- (1998) Mridu-di, My First and Foremost Mother of Affection (Mridu Bhashini Devi) —Short stories (autobiographical)
- (1998) Twenty-Seven Thousand Aspiration-Plants, part 254 —Aphorisms
- (1998) Twenty-Seven Thousand Aspiration-Plants, part 255 —Aphorisms
- (1998) Sail My Heartbeat Sail, part 1 —Poetry (rhyming)
- (1998) Twenty-Seven Thousand Aspiration-Plants, part 256 —Aphorisms
- (1998) Seventy-Seven Thousand Service-Trees, part 06 —Aphorisms
- (1998) Twenty-Seven Thousand Aspiration-Plants, part 257 —Aphorisms
- (1998) Sail My Heartbeat Sail, part 2 —Poetry (rhyming)
- (1998) Seventy-Seven Thousand Service-Trees, part 07 —Aphorisms
- (1998) Blessingful Invitations from the University-World —Lectures
- (1998) Eso Eso Prabhu, part 2 —Songs (Bengali with translations)
- (1998) Awake, Awake, My Sweetness-Soul —Songs (Bengali)
- (1998) Twenty-Seven Thousand Aspiration-Plants, part 258 —Aphorisms
- (1998) Twenty-Seven Thousand Aspiration-Plants, part 259 —Aphorisms
- (1998) My Brother Chitta —Short stories (autobiographical)
- (1998) Seventy-Seven Thousand Service-Trees, part 08 —Aphorisms
- (1998) Sadness-Heart-Silence. Madness-Mind-Eloquence —Poetry
- (1998) My Lord's Lotus-Feet Versus My Devotion-Heart, part 3 —Poetry
- (1998) Twenty-Seven Thousand Aspiration-Plants, part 260 —Aphorisms
- (1998) Jainism: Give Life, Take Not —Short stories
- (1998) Seventy-Seven Thousand Service-Trees, part 09 —Aphorisms
- (1998) Philosopher-Thinkers: the Power-Towers of the Mind and Poet-Seers: the Fragrance-Hours of the Heart in the West —Commentary
- (1998) Twenty-Seven Thousand Aspiration-Plants, part 261 —Aphorisms
- (1998) One Hundred and One Unanswered Questions, part 1 —Answers
- (1998) Twenty-Seven Thousand Aspiration-Plants, part 262 —Aphorisms
- (1998) Pioneer-Runners of Tomorrow's World-Peace-Dawn —Talks; Songs
- (1998) Sri Chinmoy with Two Brother-Stars: Narada Michael Walden and Sudhahota Carl Lewis —Tributes
- (1998) Seventy-Seven Thousand Service-Trees, part 10 —Aphorisms
- (1998) Twenty-Seven Thousand Aspiration-Plants, part 263 —Aphorisms
- (1998) Twenty-Seven Thousand Aspiration-Plants, part 264 —Aphorisms
- (1998) Twenty-Seven Thousand Aspiration-Plants, part 265 —Aphorisms
- (1998) Twenty-Seven Thousand Aspiration-Plants, part 266 —Aphorisms
- (1998) Nelson Mandela: The Pinnacle-Pillar of Mother Earth —Tributes
- (1998) Twenty-Seven Thousand Aspiration-Plants, part 267 —Aphorisms
- (1998) The Body's Fitness-Gong, The Soul's Fulness-Song [sic] —Tributes
- (1999) Twenty-Seven Thousand Aspiration-Plants, part 268 —Aphorisms
- (1999) Twenty-Seven Thousand Aspiration-Plants, part 269 —Aphorisms
- (1999) Twenty-Seven Thousand Aspiration-Plants, part 270 —Aphorisms
- (1999) Seventy-Seven Thousand Service-Trees, part 11 —Aphorisms
- (1999) Krishna Bhagaban Sri Madhusudan —Songs (Bengali)
- (1999) Amusement I Enjoy, Enlightenment I Study, part 8 —Short stories
- (1999) My Spirituality —Talks
- (1999) Girish Chandra Ghosh. From the Undivine Tree to the Divine Fruit —Answers
- (1999) My Morning Soul-Body Prayers, part 01 —Prayers
- (1999) My Religion —Poetry
- (1999) Seventy-Seven Thousand Service-Trees, part 12 —Aphorisms
- (1999) Sri Chinmoy Answers, part 09 —Answers
- (1999) My Lord Reads My Letters —Poetry
- (1999) Silence, Please! God Is Coming —Songs (English)
- (1999) Yehudi Menuhin: The Soul-Smile and the Heart-Cry —Tributes
- (1999) My Morning Soul-Body Prayers, part 02 —Prayers
- (1999) Seventy-Seven Thousand Service-Trees, part 13 —Aphorisms
- (1999) Kalpana Rath (Imagination-Chariot) —Songs (Bengali with translations)
- (1999) God Was Simply Shocked —Poetry
- (1999) Sri Chinmoy Answers, part 10 —Answers
- (1999) My Lord, How Can You Be So Heartlessly Cruel to Me? —Poetry
- (1999) Sri Chinmoy Answers, part 11 —Answers
- (1999) Philosophy: Wisdom-Chariot of the Mind —Answers
- (1999) My Morning Soul-Body Prayers, part 03 —Prayers
- (1999) Sri Chinmoy Answers, part 12 —Answers
- (1999) Sri Chinmoy Answers, part 13 —Answers
- (1999) Sri Chinmoy Answers, part 14 —Answers
- (1999) Imagine —Poetry
- (1999) Let It Be —Poetry
- (1999) Harmony —Poetry
- (1999) Sri Chinmoy Answers, part 15 —Answers
- (1999) A Peace-Collecting Pilgrim-Soul —Commentary
- (1999) My Morning Soul-Body Prayers, part 04 —Prayers
- (1999) Seventy-Seven Thousand Service-Trees, part 14 —Aphorisms
- (1999) Sri Chinmoy Answers, part 16 —Answers
- (1999) The New Millennium —Poetry
- (1999) Rani-Di, I Do Know Where You Live —Poetry
- (1999) Sri Chinmoy Answers, part 17 —Answers
- (1999) My Morning Soul-Body Prayers, part 05 —Prayers
- (1999) John Kennedy The World-Treasure-Home —Poetry
- (1999) Amare Karogo Tomar Apan —Songs (Bengali and English)
- (1999) God Answers Prayers —Songs (Bengali and English)
- (1999) An Immediate 'Yes' to God's Every Command —Songs (English)
- (1999) Rainbow-Flowers, part 2 —Commentary
- (1999) My Sweet Father-Lord, Where Are You? —Prayers
- (1999) Divine Enterprise Songbook —Songs (Bengali and English)
- (1999) Sri Chinmoy Answers, part 18 —Answers
- (1999) The Message-Light of the Bhagavad Gita —Poetry
- (1999) The Difference Between a False Master and a True Master —Poetry
- (1999) My Heart-Temple —Poetry
- (1999) My Morning Soul-Body Prayers, part 06 —Prayers
- (1999) A Heart of Oneness-Peace —Poetry
- (1999) Sri Chinmoy Answers, part 19 —Answers
- (1999) O My Aspiration-Heart, Where Are You? —Poetry
- (1999) My Prayer-Life. My Meditation-Heart —Poetry
- (1999) Rainbow-Flowers, part 3 —Commentary
- (1999) My Morning Soul-Body Prayers, part 07 —Prayers
- (1999) Seventy-Seven Thousand Service-Trees, part 15 —Aphorisms
- (1999) Two Divine Qualities: Confidence and Sincerity —Poetry
- (1999) Sri Chinmoy Answers, part 20 —Answers
- (1999) My Morning Soul-Body Prayers, part 08 —Prayers
- (1999) Chander Deshe (In the Moonland) —Songs (Bengali and English)
- (1999) The Soul's Special Promise, part 2 —Answers
- (1999) My Morning Soul-Body Prayers, part 09 —Prayers
- (1999) Seventy-Seven Thousand Service-Trees, part 16 —Aphorisms
- (2000) Seventy-Seven Thousand Service-Trees, part 17 —Aphorisms
- (2000) My Christmas-New Year-Vacation Aspiration-Prayers, part 01 —Prayers
- (2000) My Aspiration-Heart Cycles, part 1 —Poetry
- (2000) Sri Chinmoy Answers, part 21 —Answers
- (2000) My Morning Soul-Body Prayers, part 10 —Prayers
- (2000) My Christmas-New Year-Vacation Aspiration-Prayers, part 02 —Prayers
- (2000) My Christmas-New Year-Vacation Aspiration-Prayers, part 03 —Prayers
- (2000) Religion-Jugglery and God-Discovery —Commentary
- (2000) Choice Wisdom-Fountain-Souls —Commentary
- (2000) A Mystic Journey in the Weightlifting World, part 1 —Interviews
- (2000) Seventy-Seven Thousand Service-Trees, part 18 —Aphorisms
- (2000) Giti Mala —Songs (Bengali with translations)
- (2000) Emperor-Smiles. Orphan-Tears —Poetry
- (2000) Run and Smile. Smile and Run —Answers
- (2000) Sri Chinmoy Answers, part 22 —Answers
- (2000) Enthusiasm Songbook, part 01, Enthusiasm! God's Main Food! —Songs (English)
- (2000) Deshabandu: Bengal's Beloved Friend —Tributes
- (2000) Sri Chinmoy Answers, part 23 —Answers
- (2000) My Morning Soul-Body Prayers, part 11 —Prayers
- (2000) Sri Chinmoy Answers, part 24 —Answers
- (2000) My Morning Soul-Body Prayers, part 12 —Prayers
- (2000) The Moment I Please God in God's Own Way —Poetry
- (2000) Sri Chinmoy Answers, part 25 —Answers
- (2000) My Morning Soul-Body Prayers, part 13 —Prayers
- (2000) Sri Chinmoy Answers, part 26 —Answers
- (2000) One Thousand Lotus Petals Songbook, part 1 —Songs (Bengali with translations)
- (2000) My Sunrise-Heart, part 1 —Poetry
- (2000) Sri Chinmoy Answers, part 27 —Answers
- (2000) My Aspiration-Heart Cycles, part 2 —Poetry
- (2000) Seventy-Seven Thousand Service-Trees, part 19 —Aphorisms
- (2000) Yes, I Can! I Certainly Can!! —Poetry
- (2000) My Admiration for Proverbs from China, Russia and Japan —Songs
- (2000) My Morning Soul-Body Prayers, part 14 —Prayers
- (2000) Sri Chinmoy Answers, part 28 —Answers
- (2000) My Morning Soul-Body Prayers, part 15 —Prayers
- (2000) Walking-Challenging-Becoming, part 1 —Short stories (autobiographical)
- (2000) My Morning Soul-Body Prayers, part 16 —Prayers
- (2000) Aurobindo versus Sri Aurobindo —Poetry
- (2000) The Moghul Emperors —Short stories
- (2000) All My Life-Crimes You Have Forgiven, My Lord Supreme! —Songs (Bengali)
- (2001) Life's Bleeding Tears and Flying Smiles, part 01 —Short stories
- (2001) Seventy-Seven Thousand Service-Trees, part 20 —Aphorisms
- (2001) Sri Chinmoy Answers, part 28 —Answers
- (2001) Life's Bleeding Tears and Flying Smiles, part 02 —Short stories
- (2001) President Gorbachev: the Home of Oneness-Peace-Dream-World —Poetry
- (2001) Life's Bleeding Tears and Flying Smiles, part 03 —Short stories
- (2001) Seventy-Seven Thousand Service-Trees, part 21 —Aphorisms
- (2001) Life's Bleeding Tears and Flying Smiles, part 04 —Short stories
- (2001) Life's Bleeding Tears and Flying Smiles, part 05 —Short stories
- (2001) The Evening Star, part 1 —Songs (Bengali with translations)
- (2001) The Evening Star, part 2 —Songs (Bengali with translations)
- (2001) The Evening Star, part 3 —Songs (Bengali with translations)
- (2001) My Supreme —Songs (English)
- (2001) Enthusiasm Songbook, part 02, Enthusiasm-Bliss —Songs (English)
- (2001) Life's Bleeding Tears and Flying Smiles, part 06 —Short stories
- (2001) Sri Chinmoy in Russia. —Tributes
- (2001) Life's Bleeding Tears and Flying Smiles, part 07 —Short stories
- (2001) Life's Bleeding Tears and Flying Smiles, part 08 —Short stories
- (2001) Life's Bleeding Tears and Flying Smiles, part 09 —Short stories
- (2001) My Life's Every Day Hope-Blossoms and Promise-Tree —Poetry
- (2001) Life's Bleeding Tears and Flying Smiles, part 10 —Short stories
- (2000) My Christmas-New Year-Vacation Aspiration-Prayers, part 04 —Prayers
- (2001) If I Could Start My Life Once More —Poetry
- (2001) Great People and Good People —Poetry
- (2001) Seventy-Seven Thousand Service-Trees, part 22 —Aphorisms
- (2000) My Christmas-New Year-Vacation Aspiration-Prayers, part 05 —Prayers
- (2000) My Christmas-New Year-Vacation Aspiration-Prayers, part 06 —Prayers
- (2001) My Seven Hundred Soul-Bird-Ecstasy-Flights —Drawings
- (2001) My Master —Poetry
- (2001) The Mind-Jungles and the Heart-Gardens of Life —Short stories
- (2001) Here and Now —Poetry
- (2001) My Heart's God-Songs —Songs (English)
- (2001) I Love My Animal Kingdom-Songs —Songs
- (2001) Life's Bleeding Tears and Flying Smiles, part 11 —Short stories
- (2001) To-day Is the Day —Poetry
- (2001) Life's Bleeding Tears and Flying Smiles, part 12 —Short stories
- (2001) Mikhail Gorbachev: the Home of Oneness-Peace-Dream-World Songbook —Songs (Bengali with translations)
- (2001) Sri Chinmoy Answers, part 30 —Answers
- (2001) The Tears and Smiles of a God-Fragrance-Heart —Songs (Bengali)
- (2001) Seventy-Seven Thousand Service-Trees, part 23 —Aphorisms
- (2001) Sri Chinmoy Answers, part 31 —Answers
- (2001) Jharna-Kala Songbook —Songs (Bengali with translations)
- (2002) Seventy-Seven Thousand Service-Trees, part 24 —Aphorisms
- (2002) My Christmas-New Year-Vacation Aspiration-Prayers, part 07 —Prayers
- (2002) My Christmas-New Year-Vacation Aspiration-Prayers, part 08 —Prayers
- (2002) My Christmas-New Year-Vacation Aspiration-Prayers, part 09 —Prayers
- (2002) Seventy-Seven Thousand Service-Trees, part 25 —Aphorisms
- (2002) My Christmas-New Year-Vacation Aspiration-Prayers, part 10 —Prayers
- (2002) Kofi Annan: Cynosure-Eyes —Tributes
- (2002) My Christmas-New Year-Vacation Aspiration-Prayers, part 11 —Prayers
- (2002) Enthusiasm Songbook, part 03 —Songs (English)
- (2001) Sri Chinmoy Answers, part 32 —Answers
- (2002) My Christmas-New Year-Vacation Aspiration-Prayers, part 12 —Prayers
- (2002) My Christmas-New Year-Vacation Aspiration-Prayers, part 13 —Prayers
- (2002) Seventy-Seven Thousand Service-Trees, part 26 —Aphorisms
- (2002) My Christmas-New Year-Vacation Aspiration-Prayers, part 14 —Prayers
- (2002) Pope John Paul II: God's Heart-Prize Winner —Tributes
- (2001) Sri Chinmoy Answers, part 33 —Answers
- (2002) Enthusiasm Songbook, part 04 —Songs (English)
- (2002) Bahir Jagate Bhranti Prabal, part 1 —Songs (Bengali with translations)
- (2002) Bahir Jagate Bhranti Prabal, part 2 —Songs (Bengali with translations)
- (2002) A Crying Heart and a Smiling Soul —Songs
- (2002) Seventy-Seven Thousand Service-Trees, part 27 —Aphorisms
- (2002) The Sage Bhrigu Tests the Cosmic Gods —Short stories
- (2002) The Jackal's Punishment —Short stories
- (2002) Seventy-Seven Thousand Service-Trees, part 28 —Aphorisms
- (2002) Seventy-Seven Thousand Service-Trees, part 29 —Aphorisms
- (2002) Seventy-Seven Thousand Service-Trees, part 30 —Aphorisms
- (2003) The Tiny Key in the Asparagus Soup —Short stories
- (2003) My Christmas-New Year-Vacation Aspiration-Prayers, part 15 —Prayers
- (2003) Seventy-Seven Thousand Service-Trees, part 31 —Aphorisms
- (2003) My Christmas-New Year-Vacation Aspiration-Prayers, part 16 —Prayers
- (2003) My Christmas-New Year-Vacation Aspiration-Prayers, part 17 —Prayers
- (2003) Enthusiasm Songbook, part 05 —Songs (English)
- (2003) Khunjite Chahigo Tomar Nayan Pujite Chahigo Tomar Charan Songbook, part 1 —Songs (Bengali with translations)
- (2003) My Christmas-New Year-Vacation Aspiration-Prayers, part 18 —Prayers
- (2003) My Christmas-New Year-Vacation Aspiration-Prayers, part 19 —Prayers
- (2003) The Speeding Driver —Short stories
- (2003) Seventy-Seven Thousand Service-Trees, part 32 —Aphorisms
- (2003) My Christmas-New Year-Vacation Aspiration-Prayers, part 20 —Prayers
- (2003) Dhanite Chahigo Amar Jiban 2 —Songs (Bengali with translations)
- (2003) The Mind Loves the Heart, the Mind Becomes the Heart, part 1. Sri Chinmoy's ninth visit to the University of Oxford —Lectures; Commentary
- (2003) The Mind Loves the Heart, the Mind Becomes the Heart, part 2. Sri Chinmoy's ninth visit to King's College, the University of Cambridge —Lectures; Commentary
- (2003) My Christmas-New Year-Vacation Aspiration-Prayers, part 21 —Prayers
- (2003) Seventy-Seven Thousand Service-Trees, part 33 —Aphorisms
- (2003) The Oneness of the Eastern Heart and the Western Mind, part 1 —Lectures
- (2003) Seventy-Seven Thousand Service-Trees, part 34 —Aphorisms
- (2003) The Street Beggar —Poetry
- (2003) My Complete God-Surrender-Song —Songs
- (2003) How Nolini-da Wanted Me to Be His Secretary —Short stories (autobiographical)
- (2004) My Christmas-New Year-Vacation Aspiration-Prayers, part 22 —Prayers
- (2004) My Christmas-New Year-Vacation Aspiration-Prayers, part 23 —Prayers
- (2004) My Christmas-New Year-Vacation Aspiration-Prayers, part 24 —Prayers
- (2004) My Christmas-New Year-Vacation Aspiration-Prayers, part 25 —Prayers
- (2004) My Christmas-New Year-Vacation Aspiration-Prayers, part 26 —Prayers
- (2004) Seventy-Seven Thousand Service-Trees, part 35 —Aphorisms
- (2004) Archbishop Desmond Tutu: the world-Compassion-Heart-Nest —Tributes
- (2004) My Christmas-New Year-Vacation Aspiration-Prayers, part 27 —Prayers
- (2004) My Christmas-New Year-Vacation Aspiration-Prayers, part 28 —Prayers
- (2004) My Christmas-New Year-Vacation Aspiration-Prayers, part 29 —Prayers
- (2004) The Oneness of the Eastern Heart and the Western Mind, part 2 —Lectures
- (2004) Sri Chinmoy Answers, part 34 —Answers
- (2004) Ashar Duar, part 1 —Songs (Bengali with translations)
- (2004) My Christmas-New Year-Vacation Aspiration-Prayers, part 30 —Prayers
- (2004) Seventy-Seven Thousand Service-Trees, part 36 —Aphorisms
- (2004) Seventy-Seven Thousand Service-Trees, part 37 —Aphorisms
- (2004) To-morrow's Noon —Aphorisms
- (2004) Enthusiasm Songbook, part 06 —Songs (English)
- (2004) Seventy-Seven Thousand Service-Trees, part 38 —Aphorisms
- (2004) Sri Chinmoy Answers, part 35 —Answers
- (2004) The Oneness of the Eastern Heart and the Western Mind, part 3 —Lectures
- (2004) Run and Become. Become and Run, part 20 —Short stories (autobiographical)
- (2004) Enthusiasm Songbook, part 07 —Songs (English)
- (2004) Seventy-Seven Thousand Service-Trees, part 39 —Aphorisms
- (2004) I Bow to the Soul of the Parliament of Religions - Barcelona —Commentary
- (2004) Asta Rabi —Songs (Bengali with translations)
- (2004) Ashar Duar, part 2 —Songs (Bengali with translations)
- (2004) I Prayerfully Bow to the Soul of Russian —Lectures; Poetry
- (2004) A Mystic Journey in the Weightlifting World, part 2 —Short stories (autobiographical)
- (2004) Sri Chinmoy Answers, part 36 —Answers
- (2004) Seventy-Seven Thousand Service-Trees, part 40 —Aphorisms
- (2004) A Mystic Journey in the Weightlifting World, part 3 —Short stories (autobiographical)
- (2004) My Weightlifting Tears and Smiles, part 3 —Short stories (autobiographical)
- (2004) Aspiration-Body, Illumination-Soul, part 3 —Answers
- (2004) A Mystic Journey in the Weightlifting World, part 4 —Short stories (autobiographical)
- (2004) My Race-Prayers, Part 1 —Prayers
- (2005) Run and Become. Become and Run, part 21 —Short stories (autobiographical)
- (2005) The World-Experience-Tree-Climber, part 8 —Short stories (autobiographical)
- (2005) God's Glance and God's Grace —Poetry
- (2005) The Heart-Tears of a God-Seeker —Commentary
- (2005) Seventy-Seven Thousand Service-Trees, part 41 —Aphorisms
- (2005) My Christmas-New Year-Vacation Aspiration-Prayers, part 31 —Prayers
- (2005) My Christmas-New Year-Vacation Aspiration-Prayers, part 32 —Prayers
- (2005) My Early Morning Prayer-Journeys, part 1 —Prayers
- (2005) Paramer Tripti songs —Songs (Bengali)
- (2005) Sri Chinmoy Answers, part 37 —Answers
- (2005) Seventy-Seven Thousand Service-Trees, part 42 —Aphorisms
- (2005) Fifty Oneness-Heart-Songs of a Perfect God and a Perfect Child —Poetry
- (2005) Gan Likkhi Am, Part 1 —Songs (Bengali with translations)
- (2005) My Christmas-New Year-Vacation Aspiration-Prayers, part 33 —Prayers
- (2005) The United Nations: The World√ïs Oneness-Home —Poetry
- (2005) Seventy-Seven Thousand Service-Trees, part 43 —Aphorisms
- (2005) Walking-Challenging-Becoming, part 2 —Short stories (autobiographical)
- (2005) My Morning Soul-Body Prayers, part 17 —Prayers
- (2005) Sri Chinmoy Answers, part 38 —Answers
- (2005) My Christmas-New Year-Vacation Aspiration-Prayers, part 34 —Prayers
- (2005) My Early Morning Prayer-Journeys, part 2 —Prayers
- (2005) The Master and the Circus Clown (illustrated) —Short stories
- (2005) Gan Likkhi Ami, Part 2 —Songs (Bengali with translations)
- (2005) Guru, My Question Is —Answers
- (2005) Lahiri Mahashoy: A Revelation of the Beyond —Short stories
- (2005) Age Does Not Matter —Poetry
- (2005) Enthusiasm Songbook, part 08 —Songs (English)
- (2005) Seventy-Seven Thousand Service-Trees, part 44 —Aphorisms
- (2005) My Christmas-New Year-Vacation Aspiration-Prayers, part 35 —Prayers
- (2005) God's Magnet Eyes —Commentary; Aphorisms
- (2005) My Christmas-New Year-Vacation Aspiration-Prayers, part 36 —Prayers
- (2005) My Christmas-New Year-Vacation Aspiration-Prayers, part 37 —Prayers
- (2005) My Christmas-New Year-Vacation Aspiration-Prayers, part 38 —Prayers
- (2005) Enthusiasm Songbook, part 09 —Songs (English)
- (2005) My Christmas-New Year-Vacation Aspiration-Prayers, part 39 —Prayers
- (2005) My Morning Soul-Body Prayers, part 18 —Prayers
- (2006) The Bloom of My Lotus-Heart —Songs (Bengali)
- (2006) Seventy-Seven Thousand Service-Trees, part 45 —Aphorisms
- (2006) God's Heart-Room —Commentary; Aphorisms
- (2006) My Morning Soul-Body Prayers, part 19 —Prayers
- (2006) Guru the Heart, Ongkar the Soul —Prayers
- (2006) Enthusiasm Songbook, part 10 —Songs (English)
- (2006) My Christmas-New Year-Vacation Aspiration-Prayers, part 40 —Prayers
- (2006) My Christmas-New Year-Vacation Aspiration-Prayers, part 41 —Prayers
- (2006) My Morning Soul-Body Prayers, part 20 —Prayers
- (2005) My Christmas-New Year-Vacation Aspiration-Prayers, part 42 —Prayers
- (2006) A God-Devotion-Teardrop —Songs (English)
- (2006) Seventy-Seven Thousand Service-Trees, part 46 —Aphorisms
- (2006) Sundaratama Dekha Dilo Aji, Part 1 —Songs (Bengali with translations)
- (2006) My Race-Prayers, Part 2 —Prayers
- (2006) Sundaratama Dekha Dilo Aji, Part 2 —Songs (Bengali with translations)
- (2006) Jatra Amar Shesh Habe Aj —Songs (Bengali with translations)
- (2006) My Christmas-New Year-Vacation Aspiration-Prayers, part 43 —Prayers
- (2006) My Blessingful and Pride-Flooded Dedication to the Indomitable Runners of the 3100-mile Self-Transcendence Race —Prayers
- (2006) My Christmas-New Year-Vacation Aspiration-Prayers, part 44 —Prayers
- (2006) My Morning Soul-Body Prayers, part 21 —Prayers
- (2006) My Early Morning Heart-Climbing-Prayers —Prayers
- (2006) My Christmas-New Year-Vacation Aspiration-Prayers, part 45 —Prayers
- (2006) The Lotus-Grove of My Heart —Poetry
- (2006) My Christmas-New Year-Vacation Aspiration-Prayers, part 46 —Prayers
- (2006) My Christmas-New Year-Vacation Aspiration-Prayers, part 47 —Prayers
- (2006) My Christmas-New Year-Vacation Aspiration-Prayers, part 48 —Prayers
- (2006) My Christmas-New Year-Vacation Aspiration-Prayers, part 49 —Prayers
- (2007) My Christmas-New Year-Vacation Aspiration-Prayers, part 50 —Prayers
- (2007) My Christmas-New Year-Vacation Aspiration-Prayers, part 51 —Prayers
- (2007) My Christmas-New Year-Vacation Aspiration-Prayers, part 52 —Prayers
- (2007) Conversations with Sri Chinmoy —Answers
- (2007) Swadeshe Bideshe Ghuriya Berai —Songs (Bengali with translations)
- (2007) Transfiguration —Short stories
- (2007) The Inner Meaning of Sport —Answers
- (2007) My Dilip-da-Adoration —Short stories
- (2007) My Cycling Experiences in this Life —Short stories (autobiographical)
- (2007) Seventy-Seven Thousand Service-Trees, part 47 —Aphorisms
- (2007) My Blessingful and Pride-Flooded Dedication to the Indomitable Runners of the 3100-mile Self-Transcendence Race 2008 (Sri Chinmoy's Handwriting) —Poetry
- (2007) Seventy-Seven Thousand Service-Trees, part 48 —Aphorisms
- (2008) My Christmas-New Year-Vacation Aspiration-Prayers, part 53 —Prayers
- (2008) My Christmas-New Year-Vacation Aspiration-Prayers, part 54 —Prayers
- (2008) My Christmas-New Year-Vacation Aspiration-Prayers, part 55 —Prayers
- (2008) My Christmas-New Year-Vacation Aspiration-Prayers, part 56 —Prayers
- (2008) My Christmas-New Year-Vacation Aspiration-Prayers, part 57 —Prayers
- (2008) My Christmas-New Year-Vacation Aspiration-Prayers, part 58 —Prayers
- (2008) My Christmas-New Year-Vacation Aspiration-Prayers, part 59 —Prayers
- (2008) My Christmas-New Year-Vacation Aspiration-Prayers, part 60 —Prayers
- (2008) My Christmas-New Year-Vacation Aspiration-Prayers, part 61 —Prayers
- (2008) Enthusiasm Songbook, part 11 —Songs (English)
- (2008) Seventy-Seven Thousand Service-Trees, part 49 —Aphorisms
- (2008) Seventy-Seven Thousand Service-Trees, part 50 —Aphorisms
- (2008) Paradise Is Where I Bend My Knees —Songs (English)
- (2008) My Race-Prayers, part 3 —Prayers
- (2009) Your Face Is My Dream —Songs (Bengali with translations)
- (2009) My Book of Tea and Coffee Experiences —Short stories
- (2008) My God-Hunger-Cry —Poetry
- (2008) Kheya Heri Neye Heri —Songs
- (2011) Living in the eternal Now —Discourses
