= Sergei Ordzhonikidze =

Russian diplomat

- Сергей Орджоникидзе
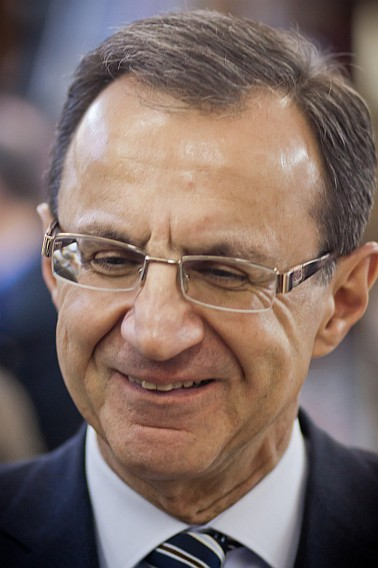
- Ordzhonikidze in 2013

Director-General of the United Nations Office at Geneva
- In office 1 March 2002 – 12 March 2011
- Preceded by: Vladimir Petrovsky
- Succeeded by: Kassym-Jomart Tokayev

Deputy Minister of Foreign Affairs
- In office 2 March 1999 – 26 February 2002
- Minister: Igor Ivanov
- Preceded by: Yuri Ushakov

Personal details
- Born: 14 March 1946 (age 80) Moscow, Soviet Union
- Citizenship: Soviet Union (1946–1991); Russia (from 1991)
- Education: Moscow State Institute of International Relations; Diplomatic Academy of the Ministry of Foreign Affairs of the Soviet Union
- Occupation: Diplomat

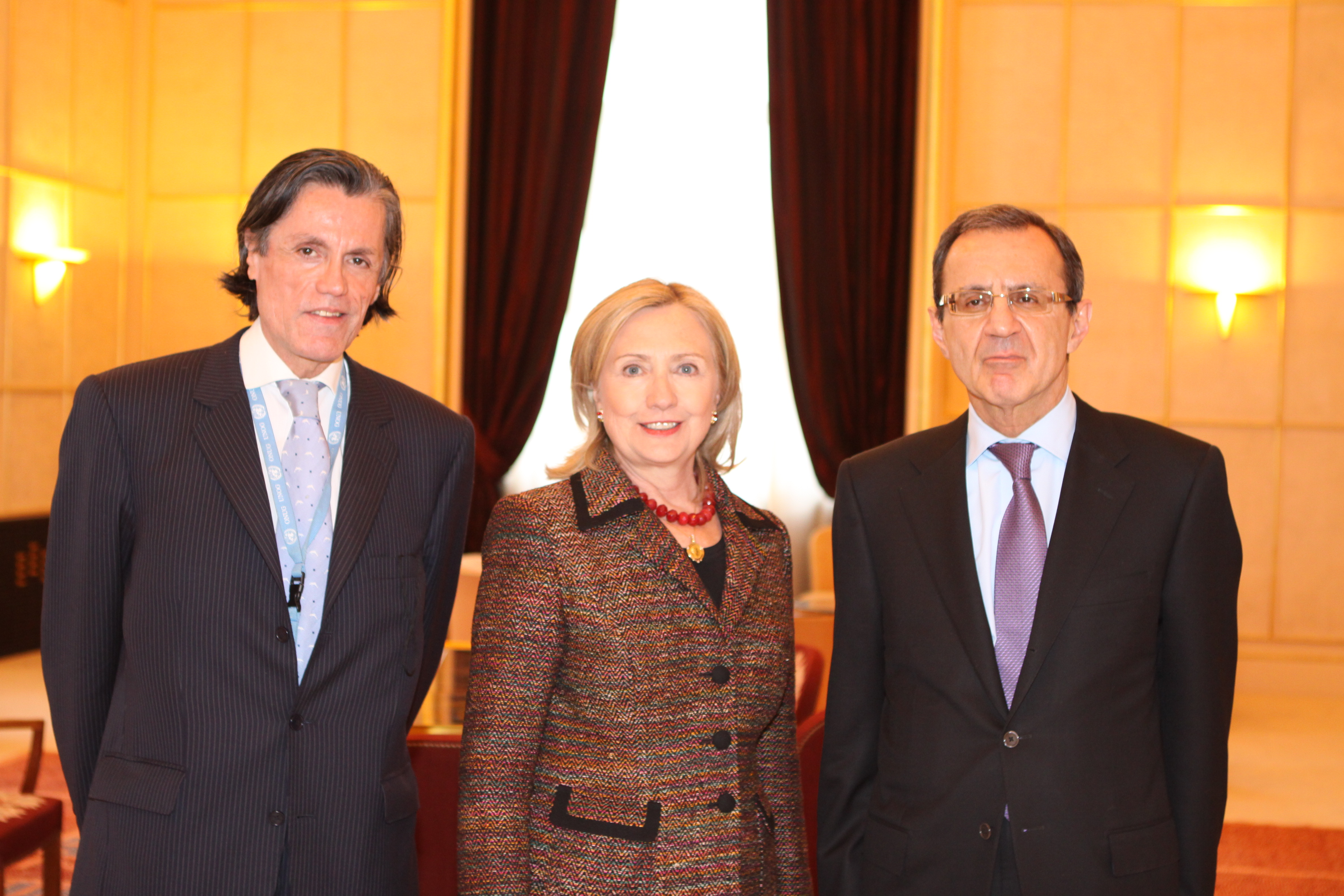
Ordzhonikidze (right) with U.S. Secretary of State Hillary Clinton and Pedro Oyarce Yuraszeck, Ambassador of Chile to the UNOG

Sergei Alexandrovich Ordzhonikidze (Russian: Сергей Александрович Орджоникидзе; born 14 March 1946) is a Russian diplomat. He was the Director-General of the United Nations Office at Geneva from 2002 to 2011.

== Early life and education ==
He was born in Moscow, Soviet Union, on 14 March 1946. His mother, Eteri (1923-2010), was the adopted daughter of Georgian-born Bolshevik revolutionary Sergo Ordzhonikidze. His father was Alexander Sergeevich Piradov, a Soviet ambassador from Tbilisi, capital of the then-Georgian SSR. Ordzhonikidze finished his studies at the Moscow State Institute of International Relations in 1969 and completed his postgraduate studies in International Law at the Diplomatic Academy of Moscow in 1978. He is fluent in English and Spanish, and can also speak French.

== Early career ==
He started his career in the Soviet diplomatic service in 1969 and served in the Permanent Mission of the Soviet Union to the United Nations in New York City until 1975. From 1975 to 1978, he was Assistant to the Deputy Foreign Minister in Moscow. From 1978 to 1983, he continued to serve in his country's permanent mission to the UN in New York City. Between 1991 and 1996, he was Deputy Permanent Representative of the Soviet Union and then of the Russian Federation to the United Nations in New York. Before that, he was Deputy Chief of the International Legal Department of the Ministry of Foreign Affairs from 1983 to 1991. From 1996 to 1999, he served as Director of the Department of International Organizations of the Ministry of Foreign Affairs. Ordzhonikidze served as Deputy Minister of Foreign Affairs of the Russian Federation, a post he had held from 1999 to 2002.

== UN Geneva Director General ==
He was first appointed to the position by UN Secretary-General Kofi Annan on 1 March 2002, and was re-appointed by Secretary-General Ban Ki-moon in February 2007. In 2011, he retired, being replaced by Kazakh diplomat Kassym-Jomart Tokayev.

== Awards and recognition ==
He holds the diplomatic rank of Ambassador Extraordinary and Plenipotentiary, and has received three state awards.

- Order of Alexander Nevsky (August 17, 2017)
- Order of Honor (March 6, 2011)
- Order of Friendship (May 12, 1998)
