= Vladimir Petrovsky =

Soviet-Russian diplomat and United Nations official

- Владимир Петровский
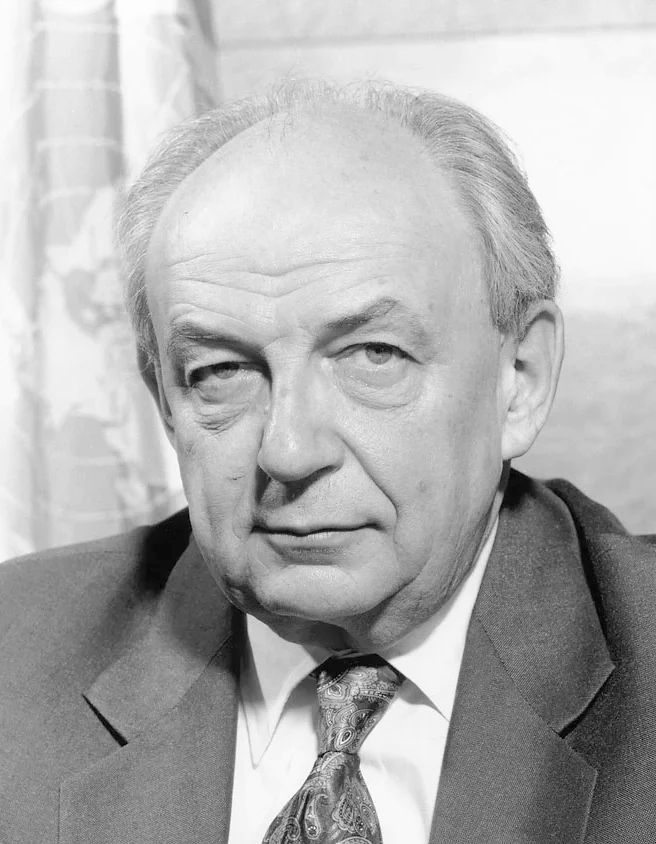
- Petrovsky in 1987

Director-General of the United Nations Office at Geneva
- In office 1993–2002
- Preceded by: Antoine Blanca
- Succeeded by: Sergei Ordzhonikidze

First Deputy Minister of Foreign Affairs of the USSR
- In office 21 September – 26 December 1991
- Minister: Eduard Shevardnadze
- Preceded by: Yuliy Kvitsinsky

Personal details
- Born: Vladimir Fyodorovich Petrovsky; 29 April 1933 Stalingrad, RSFSR, Soviet Union
- Died: 21 February 2014 (aged 80)
- Education: MGIMO
- Profession: Diplomat of Russia
- Awards: Order of the Red Banner of Labour; Order of the Badge of Honour; Jubilee Medal "In Commemoration of the 100th Anniversary of the Birth of Vladimir Ilyich Lenin"; U Thant Peace Award; Honored Employee of the Diplomatic Service of the Russian Federation

Vladimir Fyodorovich Petrovsky (Russian: Влади́мир Фёдорович Петро́вский, IPA: [vlɐˈdʲimʲɪr ˈfʲɵdərəvʲɪtɕ pɪˈtrovskʲɪj]; 29 April 1933 – 21 February 2014) was a Soviet and Russian diplomat, ambassador, professor in history, politician and writer.

He served as Deputy Foreign Minister of the Soviet Union under Soviet General Secretary Mikhail Gorbachev. In 1992 he became UN Under-Secretary-General for Political Affairs in New York. From 1993–2002 he was Director-General of the United Nations Office at Geneva. During this time he was also Secretary-General of the Conference for Disarmament. After his retirement from the United Nations, Petrovsky established the non-governmental organization Comprehensive Dialogue Among Civilizations (CDAC).

Vladimir Petrovsky died on 21 February 2014 after a long illness.

== Biography ==
=== Public service ===
1957–1961:

- Attache, Permanent Mission of the USSR to the United Nations, New York

1961–1964:

- Second Secretary, Office of the Foreign Minister of the USSR

1964–1971:

- Political Affairs Officer, Chief of Unit, United Nations Secretariat, New York

1971–1979:

- Chief Counselor, Head of American Division of the Policy Planning Department, Foreign Ministry of the USSR

1972–1975:

- Secretary-General of the USSR Delegation to the CSCE, Geneva

1979–1986:

- Head of International Organizations' Department, Foreign Ministry of the USSR Member of the USSR Foreign Ministry's Collegium

1986–1991:

- Deputy Foreign Minister of the USSR
- Head of USSR Delegations to the United Nations General Assembly, UNESCO, IAEA, UNEP, and various European fora, including the CSCE

1991:

- First Deputy Foreign Minister of the USSR
- Executive Secretary of the OSCE Conference on the Human Dimension

1992:

- Representative of Russia to the NATO Council of Cooperation

1992–1993:

- Under-Secretary-General for Political Affairs, United Nations, New York
- Special Envoy of the UN Secretary-General to Libya

1998:

- Special Envoy of the UN Secretary-General to Libya
- Special Representative of the UN Secretary-General in Albania

1993–2002:

- Under-Secretary-General, Director-General of the United Nations Office at Geneva
- Secretary-General of the Conference on Disarmament
- Personal Representative of the UN Secretary-General to the Conference on Disarmament

2002–2010:

- Senior Research Fellow, UNITAR, Geneva
- Consultant to the Russian Council of Federation, Moscow
- Head of the Center for Politico-Diplomatic, Intercultural and Inter-religious Dialogue, Institute of Europe, Russian Academy of Sciences, Moscow
- Chairman of the NGO Association 'Comprehensive Dialogue Among Civilizations' (CDaC), Geneva
- Chairman of Maecenas World Patrimony Foundation, Geneva
- Member of the Board International Dialogues Foundation IDF, The Hague
- Member of the Board Museum Geelvinck, Amsterdam

== Formal education ==
Doctorate in History, Institute of international Relations and World Economy, 1975

LL.D, Moscow State Institute of International Relations, 1962

MA, Moscow State Institute of International Relations, 1957

== Foreign Ministry of the Soviet Union ==
=== Cuban Missile Crisis ===
During October 1962 Vladimir Petrovsky worked in the office of Foreign Minister Andrei Gromyko. There were long periods of non-stop work in the Foreign Ministry building on Smolenskaya Square in Moscow to attend emergency meetings and action groups to resolve the Cuban Missile Crisis. On 27 October 1962 the USSR Ministry of Foreign Affairs prepared a positive response to the US request for the withdrawal of Soviet missiles from Cuba in exchange for US government's assurances on compliance with the territorial integrity of the island. Vladimir Petrovsky later analyzed this intense period in his memoirs.

=== The Helsinki Final Act ===
Vladimir Petrovsky was strongly involved in researching and drafting all the details of the Soviet delegation's position towards the Helsinki Process followed by the Helsinki Final Act (Helsinki Accords). It was signed during July and 1 August 1975 and became at the time a declaration of attempt to improve relations between the Communist bloc and the West. The Helsinki Accords served as the groundwork for the Organization for Security and Co-operation in Europe (OSCE).

=== Perestroika ===
Before announcing Perestroika in 1987, the Soviet government had done a multi-level research and analytical work accomplished by both the political and academical elite. In 1986 Vladimir Petrovsky was appointment as Deputy Foreign Minister of the USSR and received the task to help promote the process later known as glasnost (openness) with an assignment to supervise the Press Department, while being also in charge of other areas in the Foreign Ministry. Vladimir Petrovsky was among the specialists of the Ministry of Foreign Affairs that were chosen to formulate the progressive concepts for the framework of the New Political Thinking. In 1988 Vladimir Petrovsky was part of the task force preparing the draft for the landmark address that Soviet General Secretary Gorbachev gave at the UN General Assembly on 6 December 1988.

== The United Nations ==
In February 1992 Vladimir Petrovsky was appointed as the UN's Under-Secretary-General for Political Affairs and soon become chairman of the drafting committee for the 'Agenda for Peace". He served in this position until March 1993 when he was appointed to become Director-General of the UN Office in Geneva. He strongly promoted better cooperation among the different UN agencies as well as with regional organisations and the host country Switzerland.

=== Disarmament ===
Throughout his long diplomatic career Vladimir Petrovsky strongly stressed the essential role that disarmament should play in the comprehensive approach to security in the world. In 1978, he became a member of the Soviet delegation to the First Special Session of the UN General Assembly on Disarmament. He was involved in working out the details of the multilateral machinery for disarmament and the rules for the Conference on Disarmament (CD). In 1979, after the Soviet invasion of Afghanistan the only possibility to communicate with the West on the diplomatic level were consultations on nuclear weapons nonproliferation. In 1993, Vladimir Petrovsky became the Secretary-General of the Conference on Disarmament (CD) in Geneva, the organization for which he had helped to develop the rules of conduct earlier in 1978. Under his chairmanship the Conference on Disarmament in Geneva was able to negotiate the Comprehensive Test Ban Treaty, signed in 1996. He remained in the position of CD's Secretary-General until his retirement from the United Nations in 2002.

== NGO – Comprehensive Dialogue among Civilizations ==
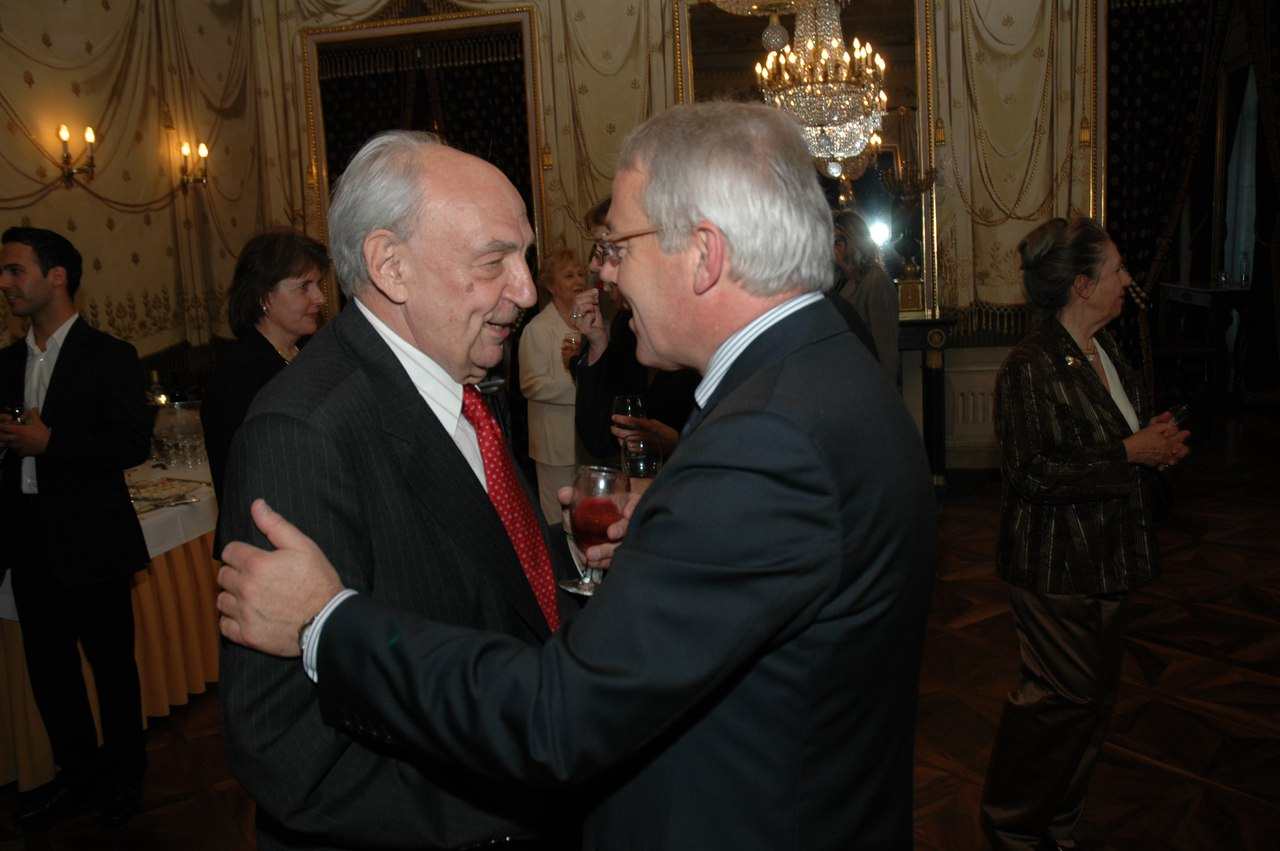
With Pierre Muller, former Mayor of Geneva at the inauguration ceremony of CDAC in Geneva, date: May 4, 2006

During his work at the United Nations, Vladimir Petrovsky promoted dialogue in all aspects, organizing a wide spectrum of events such as masterclasses, art and photo exhibitions and musical performances at the Palais des Nations. Encouraged by this work at the UN, Petrovsky founded the non-governmental organization – Comprehensive Dialogue Among Civilizations (CDAC) upon his retirement from the UN in 2002. The uniqueness of the organisation was the multifaceted approach to dialogue. His last publication "The Triad of Strategic Security of the Global Community" (2007), fell into this period.

After his death in 2014, the book "Vladimir Petrovsky: The Master Diplomat” was published in 2015, highlighting his political vision and his major achievements in the field of political and public service.

== Vladimir Petrovsky and art ==
Vladimir Petrovsky spoke endearingly about art as a whole in his Welcome address to the art exhibit "Russian Collection in the Palais des Nations" (9.06.1997) : “The state of the nation, its sense of beauty and its humour, its dreams and its history – everything is reflected in its art. I hope that this exhibition at the Palais des Nations will help many people who are coming here from all over the world to better understand Russian culture and the so-called mysterious "Russian soul"."

Vladimir Petrovsky had been introduced to Salvador Dalí, was in frequent contact with famous sculptors and artists such as Ernst Neizvestny, Michail Chemyakin, Michail and Vita Romadin and Leonid Sokov.

Under his aegis the World Patrimony Foundation was established, which restored the Henrik Sørensen wallpainting "Le Rêve de la Paix" in the Library of the Palais des Nations and Marc Chagall's "Peace Window" in the Hall of the United Nations Office in New York.

He also entertained a close friendship for many years with artist and spiritual leader Sri Chinmoy.

== Significant publications ==
- Foreign Service of Great Britain, 1958
- Diplomacy of 10 Downing Street, 1964
- Foreign Policy Thinking in the United States: Theories and Concepts, 1976
- Doctrine of National Security in the US Global Strategy, 1980
- Dialogue for Peace. Participation of the USSR in Multilateral Diplomacy, 1980
- Disarmament: Concept, Problems and Mechanisms, 1983
- Security in the Era of Nuclear and Outer Space Technology, 1985
- The Triad of Strategic Security of the Global Community, 2007
- Vladimir Petrovsky: The Master-Diplomat, 2015
