= List of presidential trips made by Barack Obama (2016–17) =

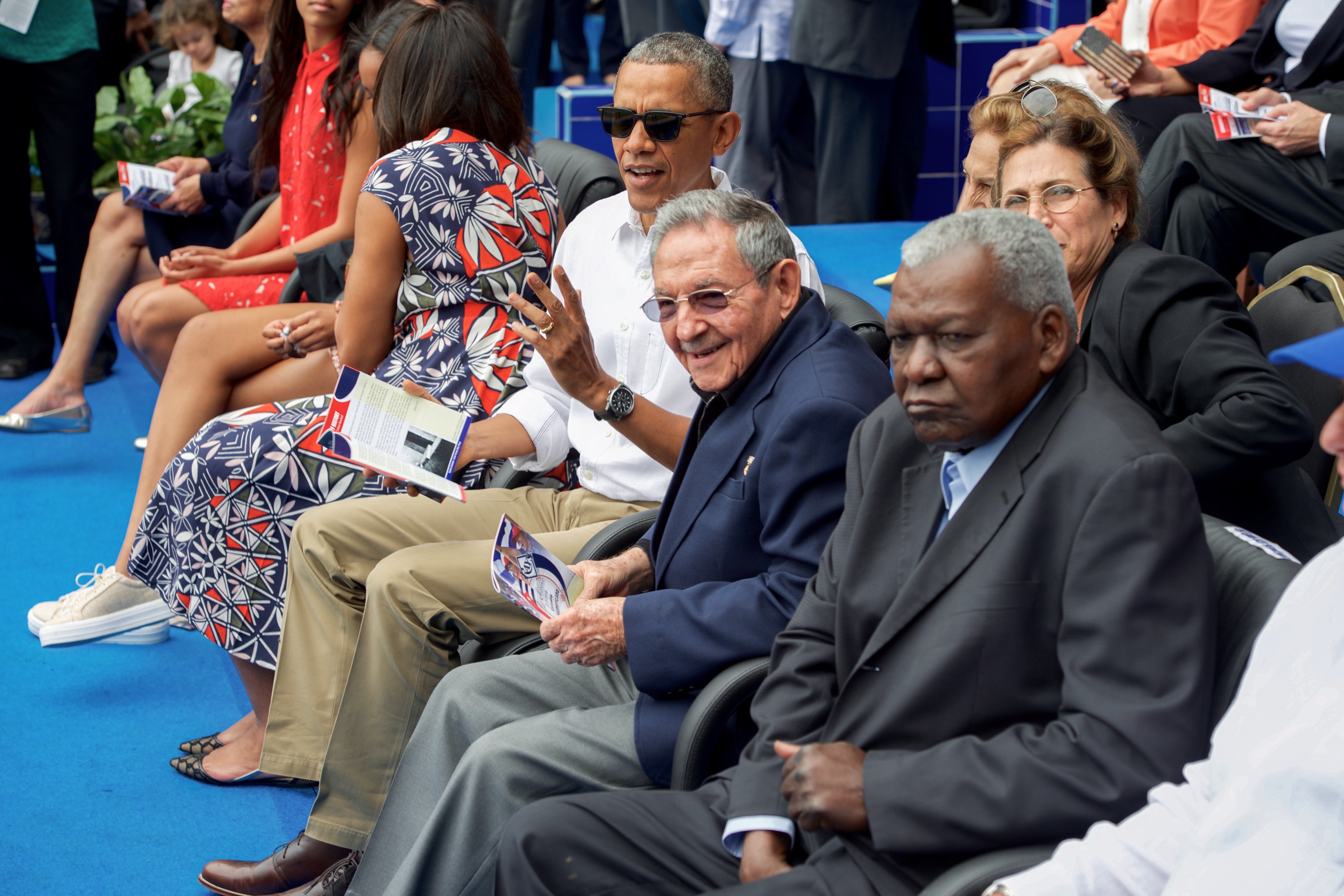
President Obama views an exhibition baseball game with Cuban president Raúl Castro at Estadio Latinoamericano during Obama's historic visit to Havana, Cuba, March 22, 2016

This is a list of presidential trips made by Barack Obama during 2016 and early 2017, the eighth and final year of his presidency as the 44th president of the United States.

This list excludes trips made within Washington, D.C., the U.S. federal capital in which the White House, the official residence and principal workplace of the president, is located. Also excluded are trips to Camp David, the country residence of the president, and to the private home of the Obama family in Kenwood, Chicago.

== January 2016 ==
Country/ U.S. state	Areas visited	Dates	Details	Image
Nebraska	Omaha, Papillion	January 13	President Obama delivered a speech at the University of Nebraska Omaha's Baxter Arena discussing the economic progress the state had made under his leadership and the "agenda for his remaining year — and the years to come — to keep it going," following his final State of the Union Address. He also visited the city of Papillion to meet with a mother who wrote him a letter last year regarding climate change.	
Louisiana	Baton Rouge	January 13–14	President Obama participated in a town hall meeting at McKinley High School discussing the economic progress the state had made under his leadership and the "agenda for his remaining year — and the years to come — to keep it going," following his final State of the Union Address. In his speech, he also touched on the expansion of Medicaid, a day after Louisiana Governor John Bel Edwards signed an executive order allowing access to the health insurance program in the state.	
Michigan	Detroit	January 20	President Obama visited the 2016 North American International Auto Show in Detroit, following the announcement in his Weekly Radio Address.	

== February ==
Country/ U.S. state	Areas visited	Dates	Details	Image
Maryland	Catonsville	February 3	President Obama visited the Islamic Society of Baltimore in Catonsville, marking his first presidential visit to a mosque in the United States.	
Illinois	Springfield	February 10	President Obama addressed the Illinois General Assembly, commemorating nine years since the launch of his presidential campaign. The president also attended a private event at the Hoogland Center for the Arts.	
California	San Francisco Bay Area, Los Angeles, Coachella Valley	February 10–16	On the evening of February 10, President Obama arrived at Moffett Federal Airfield in Mountain View and attended two Democratic Party fundraisers for Democrats running in the U.S. Senate elections, 2016 in Palo Alto and Atherton, the following day. Later that afternoon, President Obama departed the Bay Area arrived in Los Angeles and headed to Burbank to tape his appearance on The Ellen DeGeneres Show. He then attended two fundraisers organized by the Democratic National Committee in Hancock Park. On February 12, Obama flew to Palm Springs, where he designated three National Monuments: Castle Mountains National Monument, Mojave Trails National Monument, and Sand to Snow National Monument. He spent his weekend in Rancho Mirage. On the evening of February 13, President Obama delivered a statement on the death of Associate Justice Antonin Scalia. On February 15–16, President Obama hosted the U.S.-ASEAN Summit with the leaders of the Association of Southeast Asian Nations at the Sunnylands estate in Rancho Mirage. According to a statement released by the White House, the summit was aimed at strengthening cooperation on "political, security, and economic issues" between the United States and the ASEAN member states under the U.S.-ASEAN strategic partnership signed in November 2015.	
Florida	Jacksonville	February 26	President Obama toured the facilities of the Saft America Advanced Battery plant at Jacksonville's Cecil Commerce Center to tout the American Recovery and Reinvestment Act of 2009, to which Saft America won a $95.5 million grant which they used to build their facilities.	

== March ==
Country/ U.S. state	Areas visited	Dates	Details	Image
Wisconsin	Milwaukee	March 3	President Obama delivered a speech at Milwaukee's United Community Center to applaud the city's achievements in increasing the number of enrollees under the Patient Protection and Affordable Care Act after the city won a competition organized by the White House among 20 cities.	
Texas	Austin, Dallas	March 11–12	President Obama participated in a 45-minute keynote interview with The Texas Tribune editor-in-chief Evan Smith regarding the usage of technology in civic engagement at the annual South by Southwest Interactive conference, held at the Long Center for the Performing Arts in Austin. He also attended a Democratic Party fundraiser at the Austin Music Hall, as well as a private dinner-fundraiser, before flying to Dallas to attend fundraisers for the Democratic National Committee.	
Cuba	Havana	March 20–22	On February 18, 2016, a White House official announced that President Obama would undertake a historic visit to Cuba on March 20–22 to mark the end of the 54-year tensions in Cuba–United States relations, becoming the first sitting U.S. president to visit Cuba since Calvin Coolidge in 1928. In an interview with Yahoo! News in December 2015, President Obama said that he would only visit Cuba if he could meet with the Cuban dissident movement, saying: "If I go on a visit, then part of the deal is that I get to talk to everybody, I've made very clear in my conversations directly with President Raúl Castro that we would continue to reach out to those who want to broaden the scope for, you know, free expression inside of Cuba." Hours before the President and the First Family's arrival, the weekly demonstration by protesters from more than 50 Ladies in White human rights activists and other opposition groups, hoping for the President's awareness of "women fighting for the liberty of political prisoners," were cleared by Cuban police in the Havana neighborhood of Miramar. President Obama and the First Family arrived in Havana's José Martí International Airport on the rainy afternoon of Sunday, March 20, where they were greeted by Cuban officials led by Foreign Minister Bruno Rodríguez Parrilla. The First Family first headed to the Meliá Habana Hotel to meet with the staff of the newly reopened U.S. Embassy in Havana and their families. The Obamas later completed a walking tour of Old Havana (guided by Havana historian Eusebio Leal), visiting the Plaza de Armas, the Palacio de los Capitanes Generales, and the Havana Cathedral. At the Havana Cathedral, they met with Cardinal Jaime Ortega, the Archbishop of Havana, who along with Pope Francis and the Holy See helped normalize and restore Cuba–United States relations. In the evening, the Obamas dined at a local paladar in central Havana. President Obama began his Monday, March 21, by paying his respects to Cuban national hero José Martí during a brief wreath-laying ceremony at his memorial at Havana's Plaza de la Revolución. He then headed to the Palace of the Revolution to meet with his Cuban counterpart, President Raúl Castro, where he was given a welcome ceremony before the two heads of state began their official talks. During their meeting, the two presidents pledged to work towards a "new path" in reconciling their two countries' relations amid their differences in human rights and democracy. U.S. Secretaries John Kerry and Penny Pritzker of State and Commerce, respectively, were in attendance, while Vice President Miguel Díaz-Canel and Foreign Minister Bruno Rodríguez Parrilla were among the several Cuban Council of Ministers who participated in the discussions. The two leaders later participated in a joint press conference, where President Obama declared a "new day" in Cuba–U.S. relations but acknowledged President Castro's statement regarding the "profound differences" between their two countries regarding human rights and democracy, which Obama criticized. Obama also added that the embargo against Cuba and the Guantanamo Bay Naval Base continue to be obstructions in the normalization and restoration of the two countries' relations, wherein Castro responded saying that it would be "the most important obstacle to our economic development and the well-being of the Cuban people." In addition, Castro criticized the U.S.' demand for a human rights reform in Cuba, saying that "Cuba believes civil, political, economic, social and cultural rights are universal" and later adding that Cuba opposes "political manipulation and double standards in the approach to human rights." When asked by CNN's Jim Acosta about political prisoners in Cuba, Castro denied knowledge of such, insisting that his government only holds spies, terrorists and armed insurrectionists, and demanded for a list to be released. Later in the afternoon, President Obama attended an event with U.S. and Cuban entrepreneurs that would allow for the exploration of opportunities between the two countries' businesses at an effort to enhance Cuba's private sector and encourage the discontinuation of the trade embargo against Cuba amidst the country's state-owned-dominated economy. During the event, Obama urged the rehabilitation of the country's infrastructure to allow for better transportation of goods, wholesale marketing to help small business owners, and the unification of the country's dual-currency system (the Cuban peso and the Cuban convertible peso), all to improve Cuba's economy. In the evening, President Castro treated President Obama and First Lady Michelle Obama to a state dinner at the Palace of the Revolution. Secretary of State John Kerry, Secretary of Commerce Penny Pritzker, House Minority Leader Nancy Pelosi, Senior Advisor Valerie Jarrett, First Lady Chief of Staff Tina Tchen, Senator Patrick Leahy, and Representative Charles Rangel of New York's 13th congressional district were among the American entourage who attended the state dinner. On the morning of his final day in Cuba, Tuesday, March 22, President Obama addressed the Cuban people on national television from the Gran Teatro de La Habana, along Havana's Paseo del Prado. President Castro was among the Cubans in attendance at the theater. He began his remarks by responding to the Brussels bombings that occurred several hours prior, which he condemned, saying: "We can and we will defeat those who threaten the safety and security of people all around the world," and added that the attacks were a reminder "that the world must unite in fighting against the scourge of terrorism." Obama then transitioned to his speech regarding "a new chapter" in Cuba's relations with the United States and the Western Hemisphere, saying that he visited the country to "bury the last remnants of the Cold War in the Americas" and to "extend the hand of friendship to the Cuban people." He called on the U.S. Congress to lift the U.S. embargo against Cuba, saying that "it is an outdated burden on the Cuban people" and a "burden on the Americans who want to work and do business or invest here in Cuba." Obama also touched on the importance of Cubans being able to "realize their potential," as they would not "without continued change in Cuba," urging the removal of the country's two-currency system and the access of the Internet all across Cuba. Speaking for democracy to be "embraced" in Cuba, saying that it "allows for the fullest expression of the ideals of any revolution" and "gives individuals the capacity to be catalysts," he appealed for political freedom within Cubans, including the right of freedom of speech, religion and criticism of government. Obama also referenced several American and Cuban historical figures during his speech, including Cuban national hero José Martí, writer Ernest Hemingway, baseball legend Jackie Robinson, and singer Gloria Estefan. Before noon, President Obama headed to the U.S. Embassy in Havana that opened in July 2015 to meet with various Cuban dissidents and leaders of civil society organizations, praising them for their "extraordinary courage" in their fight for "democracy, freedom of speech, worship or assembly" in Cuba and expressed hope that their efforts and ideas will help shape U.S. foreign policy. Among the dissidents and the leaders of the Cuban civil society that attended the round table discussion were Guillermo Fariñas, Dagoberto Valdés Hernández, Ladies in White leader Berta Soler, Antonio Rodiles, and Elizardo Sánchez. In the afternoon, the First Family and President Castro attended an exhibition baseball game between the Tampa Bay Rays and the Cuba national baseball team at the Estadio Latinoamericano that was also attended by around 55,000 Cuban and American baseball fans. The Obamas were accompanied by Rachel Robinson, the widow of baseball player Jackie Robinson who trained in Cuba with the Brooklyn Dodgers in 1947. The Rays won the game 4–1. After the game, the Obamas headed to Havana's José Martí International Airport to depart Cuba for Buenos Aires, Argentina, where they were sent-off by President Castro, ending their three-day historic visit.	
Argentina	Buenos Aires, Bariloche	March 23–24	On February 18, 2016, a White House official announced that President Obama would undertake a state visit to Argentina on March 23–24, 2016 to improve the Argentina–United States relations under the administration of newly elected Argentine president, Mauricio Macri, after the two countries' relations under predecessors Cristina Fernández de Kirchner and Néstor Kirchner saw tension in trade and investment. President Obama and the First Family arrived in Buenos Aires' Ministro Pistarini International Airport from Havana, Cuba at around 1:10 a.m. (UTC−3) on Wednesday, March 23, where they were greeted by Argentine Foreign Minister Susana Malcorra. Later that morning, President Obama headed to the Casa Rosada for a bilateral meeting and a joint press conference with President Macri. Obama and Macri discussed ways to strengthen cooperation in promoting "universal values and interests," such as in the areas of security, energy, health and human rights, where the two presidents have agreed for U.S. federal agencies to assist Argentina's counter-terrorism efforts, to contribute to peacekeeping missions, combat illegal drug trade and organized crime, respond to diseases and outbreaks like the Zika virus, and develop resources and renewable energy strategies. Obama also praised Macri for his economic reforms that helped create "sustainable and inclusive economic growth" and "reconnected Argentina with the world economy." Thus, Obama declared a "fresh era" of relations that would help Argentina's credibility in the Latin American region and the world, and announced trade and economic initiatives to reset the countries' relations after years of tension. Foreign Minister Malcorra announced that Argentina signed agreements with the U.S. to join again on the Visa Waiver Program. Argentina initially joined on the program in 1996, but was removed in 2002. In the afternoon, President Obama visited the Buenos Aires Metropolitan Cathedral to lay a wreath at the tomb of Argentine general José de San Martín, who was known for his role as a Libertador in the Spanish American wars of independence and is considered the national hero of Argentina. There, he also met with Cardinal Mario Aurelio Poli, the Archbishop of Buenos Aires who replaced Cardinal Jorge Bergoglio when he was elected as Pope Francis. Obama then headed to the Usina del Arte to hold a town hall meeting with young Argentine leaders. In the evening, President Obama and First Lady Michelle Obama attended a state dinner hosted by President Macri and First Lady Juliana Awada at the Néstor Kirchner Cultural Centre, where both Obamas were treated with a tango dance. The Obamas began their final day in their Latin American trip with President Obama visiting the Remembrance park in Buenos Aires' Belgrano neighborhood with President Macri to honor the victims of the Dirty War by throwing flowers onto the Río de la Plata river. The Obamas' visit to Argentina coincided with the 40th anniversary of the 1976 Argentine coup d'état that extended the "war" and resulted in the killing and the forced disappearances of around 30,000 people from 1976 to 1983. The two presidents each delivered remarks at the park, where Obama apologized for the U.S.' "slow" policies in responding to the "war" saying: "Each of us have a responsibility each and every day to make sure that wherever we see injustice, wherever we see rule of law flaunted that we take responsibility to make this a better place for our children and grandchildren." Obama also said that the U.S. would help the families of the victims "heal" from the effects of the "war" through transparency by revealing files that prove the violation of human rights during the military dictatorship, upon the request of President Macri. In the afternoon, the Obama family left Buenos Aires for a trip to the Patagonian town of Bariloche; Obama became the fourth U.S. president to visit the town. The Obamas left Buenos Aires from the Ezeiza Airport and arrived at Bariloche at the San Carlos de Bariloche Airport. In Bariloche, the family stayed at the Llao Llao Hotel, sailed on the Nahuel Huapi Lake, and hiked in Nahuel Huapi National Park. President Macri then bade farewell to the Obama family before the Obamas' departure and return to Washington, D.C., ending their five-day Latin American trip.	
Georgia	Atlanta	March 29	President Obama participated in the annual National Rx Drug Abuse & Heroin Summit, held at the Westin Peachtree Plaza Hotel in downtown Atlanta, where he met with former drug addicts to discuss the combat of opioid abuse.	

== April ==
Country/ U.S. state	Areas visited	Dates	Details	Image
Illinois	Chicago	April 7	President Obama met with law school students during a town hall discussion at the University of Chicago Law School to discuss "the Supreme Court, the integrity of it as an institution and the importance of it for the country's judicial system," according to White House Communications Director Daniel Pfeiffer. Prior to his election in the U.S. Senate, Obama served as a professor and a senior lecturer on constitutional law at the school. While in Chicago, Obama also pushed for his nomination of Merrick Garland to replace the late Associate Justice Antonin Scalia at the Supreme Court.	
California	Los Angeles, Santa Monica, San Francisco	April 7–8	President Obama and his eldest daughter Malia attended a series of fundraisers within the Greater Los Angeles Area and the San Francisco Bay Area for the Democratic Congressional (DCCC) and Democratic Senatorial (DSCC) campaign committees, including one at the residence of Walt Disney Studios chairman Alan F. Horn in Bel Air for the DCCC and another at the residence of actor Tobey Maguire and his wife Jennifer Meyer for the DSCC, the following morning.	
Saudi Arabia	Riyadh	April 20–21	In Riyadh, President Obama attended a summit meeting with the Gulf Cooperation Council to discuss ways of addressing ISIL and other regional conflicts, including the Syrian and Yemeni crises. He also met with King Salman and held an audience with the Saudi royal court. Obama's visit to Saudi Arabia coincided with the announcement of a bipartisan bill allowing families of victims of the September 11 attacks to file a lawsuit against Saudi Arabian officials for involvement in the terrorist attacks, which the White House has threatened to veto to avoid tension in Saudi Arabia–United States relations.	
United Kingdom	London, Windsor, Watford	April 21–24	President Obama stopped by London to urge British voters to vote for the United Kingdom to remain in the European Union ahead of the referendum on June 23. On April 22, the President and First Lady Michelle Obama attended a private lunch with Queen Elizabeth II and Prince Philip, Duke of Edinburgh at Windsor Castle, a day after the Queen's 90th birthday. President Obama also met with British Prime Minister David Cameron at 10 Downing Street, participating in a joint press conference. Later that evening, the Obamas attended a dinner hosted by Prince William, Duke of Cambridge, Catherine, Duchess of Cambridge, and Prince Harry at Kensington Palace. On April 23, President Obama first toured Shakespeare's Globe and viewed a snippet from a production of Hamlet to commemorate the 400th death anniversary of William Shakespeare. He then participated in a town hall meeting with the British youth at Lindley Hall, where he addressed questions regarding political issues like terrorism, trade, and the Northern Ireland peace process, as well as social issues and changes involving LGBT rights, racial inequality (touching on the Black Lives Matter movement), and discrimination towards non-binary gender persons. There at Lindley Hall, Obama also met with Labour Party and Opposition Leader Jeremy Corbyn. In the afternoon, President Obama and Prime Minister Cameron played golf at The Grove in Watford, Hertfordshire. The two leaders then had dinner at Winfield House, the U.S. ambassador's residence in the United Kingdom. President Obama departed for Germany the following day.	
Germany	Hanover	April 24–25	President Obama traveled to Hanover, Germany to promote the Transatlantic Trade and Investment Partnership, which was met with criticism among Germans. He met with German Chancellor Angela Merkel to discuss cooperation in resolving the Syrian and Libyan civil wars and the Russo-Ukrainian War, before discussing the topics with other European leaders including British prime minister David Cameron, French President François Hollande, and Italian Prime Minister Matteo Renzi. During a news conference with Chancellor Merkel, President Obama announced has planned to increase U.S. military presence in Syria to at least 250 personnel to combat ISIL and assist local Syrian forces in doing so. Obama and Merkel later joined the United States delegation in their participation at the Hannover Messe, the world's largest industrial fair, with the U.S. being the "partner country" of the fair. He became the first sitting U.S. president to attend the fair.	

== May ==
Country/ U.S. state	Areas visited	Dates	Details	Image
Michigan	Flint	May 4	President Obama traveled to Flint, Michigan, in response to the water crisis in that city, calling on the Michigan government to provide safe drinking water. President Obama responded to an email from 8-year-old Flint resident Amariyanna "Mari" Copeny, in which she pleaded with him to visit Flint. President Obama responded, stating that he accepted her invitation to visit Flint. The president also met with Flint Mayor Karen Weaver and Michigan governor Rick Snyder, among others. Obama visited the Food Bank of Eastern Michigan, where he sipped the city's filtered water to assure Flint residents of their safety, and addressed the people of Flint at the Flint Northwestern High School.	
New Jersey	New Brunswick	May 15	President Obama delivered a commencement speech at Rutgers University's 250th anniversary commencement ceremony, held at the university's High Point Solutions Stadium.	
Vietnam	Hanoi, Ho Chi Minh City	May 22–25	During the U.S.-ASEAN Summit in February 2016, a White House official confirmed that President Obama had accepted an invitation from Vietnamese Prime Minister Nguyễn Tấn Dũng to visit Vietnam in May, as part of a trip to Asia. The trip aims to build stronger economic and defense ties with Asian-Pacific allies, amid the South China Sea territorial disputes. The Obama administration has expressed its commitment to assist Vietnam in seeking maritime security and the freedom of navigation in the South China Sea. President Obama arrived in Hanoi on late Sunday, May 22. The following day, he met with Vietnamese President Trần Đại Quang at the Presidential Palace of Vietnam and National Assembly Chairwoman Nguyễn Thị Kim Ngân at the former residence of revolutionary Communist leader Ho Chi Minh. President Obama and President Quang discussed the continuing normalization of ties between the two countries following the Vietnam War, the pursuit of the Trans-Pacific Partnership to support trade and reinforce regional cooperation, and defense cooperation in the South China Sea territorial disputes. The two presidents also signed several bilateral agreements, including a $11.3 billion purchase of 100 Boeing aircraft by the Vietnamese low-cost carrier VietJet Air. During a joint press conference with President Quang, Obama announced the full lifting of a 50-year arms embargo on Vietnam, describing the embargo as "a lingering vestige of the Cold War." He also announced that the Peace Corps would operate in Vietnam for the first time, focused on teaching the English language to Vietnamese students. In the afternoon, President Obama attended a state luncheon at the Presidential Palace, Hanoi, hosted by President Quang, with Prime Minister Nguyễn Xuân Phúc, Communist Party General Secretary Nguyễn Phú Trọng, and National Assembly chairwoman Nguyễn Thị Kim Ngân in attendance. In the evening, President Obama dined with American celebrity chef Anthony Bourdain at a local Hanoi restaurant, filming for an episode of Bourdain's show, Anthony Bourdain: Parts Unknown. On Tuesday, May 24, President Obama first met with ten activists advocating to solve different social issues facing Vietnam, including human rights issues such as freedom of speech, freedom of the press and Internet freedom. He later addressed the Vietnamese people from the Vietnam National Convention Center to discuss the progress made by the United States and Vietnam following the Vietnam War while taking into account their differences in human rights, which Obama prompts Vietnam for, saying that "the country should be more open to scrutiny in order to grow stronger and more prosperous" since "human rights is not a threat to stability but reinforces it." Following his speech, Obama departed Hanoi for Ho Chi Minh City, the country's largest city, arriving there late afternoon. In Ho Chi Minh City, President Obama visited the Jade Emperor Pagoda to pay tribute to the culture of Vietnam, which is one of the oldest in Southeast Asia. He later met with young entrepreneurs and the local business community at the DreamPlex Coworking Space, where he also promoted the proposed Trans-Pacific Partnership, saying that it will boost economic competitiveness and improve labor standards that would prohibit forced and child labor. On Wednesday, May 25, President Obama met with Japanese Prime Minister Shinzō Abe ahead of the 42nd G7 summit, a conference of the leaders of the Group of Seven nations. On the same day, Obama participated in the Young Southeast Asian Leaders Initiative (YSAELI) town hall, where he urged some 800 young Southeast Asian leaders to tackle climate change. Obama ended his three-day visit to Vietnam, departing Ho Chi Minh City for Japan later that afternoon.	
Japan	Shima, Ise, Hiroshima	May 25–27	President Obama traveled to Japan to attend the 42nd G7 summit in Shima, Mie Prefecture, where the agenda focused on the global economy, geopolitical issues like North Korea's nuclear program, the South China Sea territorial disputes and the Russo-Ukrainian War, and the threats of Islamic extremism in the Middle East. Prior to the G7 summit, Obama held bilateral talks with Japanese prime minister Abe on similar issues. During a joint news conference, Abe protested a recent killing of a 20-year-old Okinawa woman by a former U.S. Marine from Kadena Air Base. Obama expressed regret for the murder and said that the U.S. is willing to fully cooperate with the investigation. The G7 leaders also visited the Ise Grand Shrine, a Shinto shrine in the city of Ise. On Friday, May 27, Obama traveled to Hiroshima to visit the Hiroshima Peace Memorial Park with Prime Minister Abe to highlight their continued commitment to pursuing peace and security in a world without nuclear weapons. In doing so, Obama became the first sitting American president to visit the site of the U.S. atomic bombing of Hiroshima in August 1945.	
Virginia	Arlington	May 30	President Obama participated in Memorial Day ceremonies at Arlington National Cemetery.	

== June ==
Country/ U.S. state	Areas visited	Dates	Details	Image
Indiana	Elkhart	June 1	President Obama visited Elkhart, Indiana to highlight the economic progress made by his administration during his presidency, where he delivered remarks and held a town hall meeting at Concord High School. Elkhart was the first city Obama visited as president in February 2009 when the city was among those that were severely affected by the Great Recession, prompting the American Recovery and Reinvestment Act of 2009.	
Colorado	Colorado Springs	June 2	President Obama delivered the commencement speech at the United States Air Force Academy. While in Colorado Springs, an F-16 fighter jet crashed at nearby Peterson Air Force Base. The pilot, a member of the Thunderbirds Air Force demonstration squadron, ejected safely and later met with President Obama. The president thanked the pilot for his service to the country, and also thanked the emergency responders for their efforts.	
Florida	Miami, Miami Beach, Palm City	June 3–5	President Obama attended a series of fundraisers for the Democratic Party, including one for Florida representative Patrick Murphy's Senate election bid, across the Miami metropolitan area. The President spent the remainder of his weekend in Palm City.	
New York	New York City	June 8	President Obama taped an appearance on The Tonight Show Starring Jimmy Fallon and attended a Democratic National Committee fundraiser at the residence of The Huffington Post co-founder and BuzzFeed chairman Kenneth Lerer in Manhattan.	
Florida	Orlando	June 16	President Obama traveled to Orlando, Florida in the wake of the deadly nightclub shooting there, the deadliest mass shooting in U.S. history at the time. The president paid his respects to the victims' families. President Obama was accompanied by Vice President Joe Biden on the trip. Obama traveled to Florida aboard Air Force One along with U.S. senator Bill Nelson, U.S. senator Marco Rubio, and Florida representative Corrine Brown. President Obama spent several hours at the Amway Center, meeting with and giving his condolences to the families and friends of the Pulse LGBT nightclub shooting victims. Obama and Biden then traveled to the Dr. Phillips Center for the Performing Arts, where they placed 49 white roses at a memorial for the shooting victims - one rose for each murder victim.	
New Mexico	Carlsbad Caverns National Park	June 17	President Obama and the First Family visited Carlsbad Caverns National Park as part of the National Park Service's centennial celebrations to promote nature conservation.	
California	Yosemite National Park	June 17–19	President Obama and the First Family visited Yosemite National Park as part of the National Park Service's centennial celebrations to promote nature conservation.	
California	San Francisco Bay Area	June 23–24	President Obama attended the Global Entrepreneurship Summit 2016 at Stanford University, where he held a conversation with technology leaders like Facebook CEO and co-founder Mark Zuckerberg. During his speech at the convention, Obama commented on the United Kingdom's decision to withdraw from the European Union following the result of their nationwide referendum held on June 23, saying that the Special Relationship between the U.S. and the UK is "enduring"; that UK's membership in NATO is "a vital cornerstone of U.S. foreign, security, and economic policy"; and the U.S.' relationship with both the UK and the EU will "remain indispensable".	
Washington	Seattle, Medina	June 24–25	President Obama attended two fundraisers in or near the Seattle metropolitan area, one for Washington Governor Jay Inslee's re-election campaign at the Washington State Convention Center in Seattle and another at the residence of Concur Technologies CEO Steve Singh in Medina.	
Canada	Ottawa	June 29	President Obama traveled to Canada for a state visit, where he met with Canadian Governor General David Johnston and Canadian Prime Minister Justin Trudeau and addressed a joint session of the Canadian Parliament. He also participated in the North American Leaders' Summit with Prime Minister Trudeau and Mexican President Enrique Peña Nieto.	

== July ==
Country/ U.S. state	Areas visited	Dates	Details	Image
North Carolina	Charlotte	July 5	President Obama campaigned with former secretary of state Hillary Clinton at the Charlotte Convention Center in Charlotte, North Carolina for the latter's bid for the presidency in the 2016 election.	
Poland	Warsaw	July 7–9	President Obama traveled to Poland to attend the NATO summit meeting in Warsaw and met with Polish President Andrzej Duda, European Council President and former Polish Prime Minister Donald Tusk, and European Commission President Jean-Claude Juncker to discuss counterterrorism, the Syrian refugee crisis, and economics. The agenda of Obama's last NATO summit focused on strengthening defense cooperation to protect Eastern Europe from Russian aggression on Ukraine, confronting the ISIL in Iraq and Syria, the European migrant crisis, and the United Kingdom withdrawal from the European Union. He also announced that around 1,000 extra troops will be deployed to Poland to bolster Nato's eastern flank. While in Warsaw, President Obama also addressed American public reaction to the shooting of Alton Sterling in Baton Rouge, Louisiana and the shooting of Philando Castile in Minnesota, cases which have led to protests in the United States and allegations of racial injustice and profiling by police. Obama stated, in part, "When incidents like these occur, there's a big chunk of our fellow citizens that feels as if because of the color of their skin, they are not being treated the same—and that hurts." The police shootings in Louisiana and Minnesota have led to large, nationwide protests in the United States. During a joint press conference with presidents Tusk and Juncker, Obama also commented on the shooting of Dallas police officers in the aftermath of the fatal shootings of Sterling and Castile, the deadliest single incident in the history of U.S. law enforcement since the September 11, 2001 attacks, which he called "a vicious, calculated and despicable attack on law enforcement."	
Spain	Madrid, Rota	July 9–10	President Obama traveled to Spain for the first time as president to meet with the Spanish Prime Minister Mariano Rajoy and King Felipe VI. He also meet with troops at Naval Station Rota in Rota, Cádiz. The President initially scheduled a trip to Seville on July 11 to visit the remains of Christopher Columbus, but decided to cancel it and return to Washington, D.C. earlier in preparation for his visit to Dallas, Texas later that week.	
Texas	Dallas	July 12	President Obama accepted the invitation of Dallas Mayor Mike Rawlings to travel to Dallas, Texas to speak at the memorial service at the Morton H. Meyerson Symphony Center for the five police officers killed in the city on July 7. President Obama and former president George W. Bush both delivered speeches. Also in attendance were First Lady Michelle Obama, Vice President Joe Biden and Second Lady Jill Biden, and former first lady Laura Bush.	
Pennsylvania	Philadelphia	July 27	President Obama delivered remarks at the 2016 Democratic National Convention at the Wells Fargo Center.	

== August ==
Country/ U.S. state	Areas visited	Dates	Details	Image
Georgia	Atlanta	August 1	President Obama spoke at a Disabled American Veterans conference at the Hyatt Regency Atlanta.	
Louisiana	Baton Rouge	August 23	President Obama visited Zachary, East Baton Rouge Parish, where he surveyed the damage caused by the Louisiana floods, and met with local leaders to discuss the recovery process.	
Nevada	Lake Tahoe, Stateline	August 31	President Obama was joined by senators Harry Reid of Nevada, and Dianne Feinstein and Barbara Boxer of California as well as California Governor Jerry Brown at Lake Tahoe. He pointed to progress in restoring the lake as proof that progress in protecting the environment is possible. The president also spoke about the lake's importance to the Washoe people. President Obama spoke before a crowd at Harveys Lake Tahoe, in Stateline.	
Hawaii	Honolulu	August 31	Arriving at Joint Base Pearl Harbor–Hickam, President Obama delivered an address at the Pacific Islands Conference of Leaders at the East-West Center in Honolulu, Hawaii.	

== September ==
Country/ U.S. state	Areas visited	Dates	Details	Image
Midway Atoll	Sand Island	September 1	President Obama traveled to Sand Island in the Midway Atoll, an unincorporated territory of the United States, arriving at Henderson Field. The purpose of the visit was to commemorate the expansion of the Papahānaumokuākea Marine National Monument National Wildlife Refuge in the area, accomplished by the President's Executive Order. The President called for increased world action on environmental protection while speaking at Turtle Beach.	
Hawaii	Honolulu	September 2–3	President Obama traveled to Hawaii, arriving at Joint Base Pearl Harbor–Hickam following his brief visit earlier in the day to Midway Atoll. Obama spent the night on Oahu, then traveled to China the next day.	
China	Hangzhou	September 3–5	President Obama traveled to China to attend the G-20 summit meeting in Hangzhou, Zhejiang, arriving at Hangzhou Xiaoshan International Airport. President Obama and President Xi Jinping of China committed their two nations to a climate change agreement, "offering a rare display of harmony in a relationship that has become increasingly discordant." Obama also met with British prime minister Theresa May and Turkish president Recep Tayyip Erdoğan during the summit. Obama and Russian president Vladimir Putin met on the sidelines of the conference, having a "candid, blunt and businesslike" 90-minute exchange on the Syrian Civil War (following up on the weeks of prior negotiations on the issue between U.S. secretary of state John Kerry and Russian foreign minister Sergey Lavrov). However, Obama and Putin were ultimately unable to come to an agreement to advance the Syrian peace process.	
Laos	Vientiane, Luang Prabang	September 5–8	President Obama traveled to Laos to attend the East Asia Summit with the leaders of the Association of Southeast Asian Nations in Vientiane, becoming the first sitting U.S. president to visit the country. Obama met with Laotian President Bounnhang Vorachith at the Presidential Palace. Obama canceled a scheduled meeting with Philippine President Rodrigo Duterte after the latter insulted Obama on his comments about the Philippine drug war and human rights in the Philippines. Obama instead met with South Korean President Park Geun-hye to discuss the North Korean nuclear program. Speaking at the Cooperative Orthotic Prosthetic Enterprise (COPE) Centre, Obama announced that the U.S. would spend $90 million within the next three years to clear up the unexploded ordnance that the U.S. planted in Laos during the Vietnam War. President Obama later traveled to Luang Prabang, where he visited the Wat Xieng Thong temple. The President subsequently held at town hall at Souphanouvong University with the Young Southeast Asian Leaders Initiative. Returning to Vientiane, the President held a press conference at the Landmark Mekong Riverside Hotel.	
Japan	Fussa	September 8	Air Force One, carrying President Obama, stopped over in Yokota Air Base in Fussa, Tokyo for refueling.	
Alaska	Anchorage	September 8	Air Force One stopped over at Ted Stevens Anchorage International Airport while returning from the President's trip to Asia.	
Virginia	Arlington	September 11	President Obama attended a memorial ceremony at the Pentagon Memorial in Arlington County, Virginia, where he spoke on the fifteenth anniversary of the September 11 attacks.	
Pennsylvania	Philadelphia	September 13	President Obama spoke at a rally in support of Hillary Clinton's presidential campaign, outside of the Philadelphia Museum of Art.	
New York	New York City	September 13	President Obama attended a Democratic Congressional Campaign Committee fundraiser at the residence of investment manager James Chanos, located on the Upper East Side Manhattan in New York City.	
New York	New York City	September 18–21	President Obama met with Iraqi prime minister Haider al-Abadi on Monday, September 19, to discuss military progress against ISIL. In a press statement, the President also responded to the New York and New Jersey bombings that occurred nearby. On Tuesday, Barack Obama addressed the United Nations General Assembly. After speaking at the UN, Obama co-hosted a meeting along with leaders from Canada, Ethiopia, Germany, Jordan, Mexico and Sweden along with United Nations Secretary General Ban Ki-moon, and attended by many other nations, at a Leaders Summit on Refugees. Obama and other leaders spoke on the needs of international refugees, and encouraged nations to take in more families fleeing war zones around the world. On Wednesday, President Obama met with Israeli prime minister Benjamin Netanyahu, marking the final meeting between the two as leaders. Obama and Netanyahu discussed the state of U.S./Israeli relations and the state of the Israeli–Palestinian peace process. Netanyahu invited President Obama to visit Israel after he leaves office.	
Virginia	Fort Lee	September 28	President Obama attended a town hall, hosted by CNN, with members of the United States Armed Forces in the U.S. Air Force Transportation School High Bay hangar at Fort Lee, Virginia.	
Israel	Jerusalem	September 29–30	President Obama led the U.S. delegation in their attendance at the funeral of former Israeli President and Prime Minister Shimon Peres, arriving at Ben Gurion International Airport. President Obama delivered a eulogy at a ceremony at the Mount Herzl national cemetery. Obama was accompanied by U.S. secretary of state John Kerry and former U.S. president Bill Clinton.	

== October ==
Country/ U.S. state	Areas visited	Dates	Details	Image
Illinois	Chicago	October 7–9	President Obama traveled to Chicago to attend events for the Democratic Congressional Campaign Committee, and for Hillary Clinton's presidential campaign. Obama also voted at the Cook County Office Building. Obama will also attend a campaign event for Congresswoman Tammy Duckworth.	
North Carolina	Greensboro	October 11	President Obama traveled to Greensboro, North Carolina, arriving at Piedmont Triad International Airport. Obama participated in a town hall style discussion at North Carolina A&T State University, hosted by sports network ESPN, and took questions regarding the My Brother's Keeper Challenge, and the role of black colleges and universities. Barack Obama then attended a campaign event, and delivered remarks in support of Hillary Clinton's presidential campaign. The president delivered the remarks at Greensboro Coliseum Complex's White Oak Amphitheatre before returning to Washington. President Obama traveled to North Carolina one day after declaring the state a federal disaster area, following the damage caused by Hurricane Matthew there.	
Pennsylvania	Pittsburgh	October 13	President Obama traveled to Pittsburgh, arriving at Pittsburgh International Airport. Obama was given a tour of the White House Frontiers Conference at the University of Pittsburgh. Later, Obama delivered remarks during the same conference at the Jared L. Cohon University Center at Carnegie Mellon University.	
Ohio	Columbus, Cleveland	October 13–14	President Obama traveled to Columbus, Ohio, after leaving Pittsburgh, arriving at John Glenn Columbus International Airport. Barack Obama spoke at a political event for the Ohio Democratic Party, and in support of former governor Ted Strickland's campaign for U.S. Senate at the Greater Columbus Convention Center. Later, Obama traveled to Cleveland, arriving at Cleveland Hopkins International Airport. President Obama remained overnight in Cleveland, and then campaigned for Hillary Clinton's presidential campaign as well as other Democrats during a series of television, radio and other speeches.	
Florida	Miami, Miami Gardens	October 20	President Obama traveled to Miami, Florida, to speak at Miami Dade College on the Patient Protection and Affordable Care Act. Obama also campaigned for Hillary Clinton's presidential campaign. President Obama then spoke at Florida Memorial University in nearby Miami Gardens, campaigning for U.S. Senate candidate Patrick Murphy as well as Hillary Clinton.	
Nevada	Las Vegas	October 23	President Obama traveled to Las Vegas, Nevada, to campaign for Hillary Clinton's presidential campaign, as well as Catherine Cortez Masto, who is running to represent the State of Nevada in her bid to replace the retiring Harry Reid in the U.S. Senate. Obama held a rally at Cheyenne High School in North Las Vegas.	
California	San Diego, Los Angeles	October 24–25	President Obama traveled to California, to campaign for Hillary Clinton's presidential campaign as well to a private meeting with a Hollywood group to raise money for her presidential campaign. Obama also taped an appearance on Jimmy Kimmel Live!. Departing from McCarran International Airport, the President arrived at Marine Corps Air Station Miramar in Miramar, San Diego. Obama attended campaign events in San Diego and Los Angeles for two days.	
Florida	Orlando	October 28	President Obama traveled to Orlando, Florida, to campaign for Hillary Clinton's presidential campaign.	

== November ==
Country/ U.S. state	Areas visited	Dates	Details	Image
Ohio	Columbus	November 1	President Obama traveled to Columbus, Ohio, to campaign for Hillary Clinton's presidential campaign, and encouraged supporters to vote early.	
North Carolina	Raleigh	November 2	President Obama traveled to Raleigh, North Carolina, to campaign for Hillary Clinton's presidential campaign.	
Florida	Miami, Jacksonville	November 3–4	President Obama traveled to Florida to campaign for Hillary Clinton's presidential campaign. Obama appeared at a morning rally on November 3 at the Florida International University Arena in Miami before appearing at an early afternoon rally at the University of North Florida Arena in Jacksonville. Obama appeared at another Clinton event on the following day.	
North Carolina	Charlotte	November 4	President Obama traveled to Charlotte, North Carolina, to campaign for Hillary Clinton's presidential campaign.	
Maryland	Andrews Air Force Base	November 5	President Obama spent part of the day at Andrews Air Force Base, in Maryland, playing golf. While in Maryland, an armed man was arrested near the White House, one of two security incidents that day involving both government and private buildings in Washington, D.C.	
Florida	Orlando	November 6	President Obama traveled to Orlando, Florida, to campaign for Hillary Clinton's presidential campaign.	
Michigan	Ann Arbor	November 7	President Obama traveled to Ann Arbor, Michigan, to campaign for Hillary Clinton. Barack Obama spoke at Ray Fisher Stadium, on the campus of the University of Michigan.	
New Hampshire	Durham	November 7	President Obama traveled to New Hampshire, arriving at Pease Air National Guard Base, to campaign for Hillary Clinton, as well as fellow Democratic candidates Maggie Hassan for U.S. Senate and gubernatorial candidate Colin Van Ostern. Obama spoke at the University of New Hampshire campus in Durham, addressing a crowd at the Whittemore Center.	
Pennsylvania	Philadelphia	November 7	President Obama attended a massive, outdoor, election eve rally in Independence Mall, in front of Philadelphia's Independence Hall, where he introduced Hillary Clinton. Before introducing her, the president gave a speech in support of Clinton, and other Democratic candidates. Obama was joined on stage by his wife Michelle, as well as Bill and Chelsea Clinton. Jon Bon Jovi and Bruce Springsteen performed during the event.	
Virginia	Arlington	November 11	As part of Veterans Day commemorations, President Obama traveled to Arlington National Cemetery, laying a wreath at the Tomb of the Unknowns and participating at a ceremony at the Arlington Memorial Amphitheater.	
Greece	Athens	November 15–16	President Obama traveled to Athens, Greece for his last official state visit, part of his final overseas trip as president. He met with Greek Prime Minister Alexis Tsipras and President Prokopis Pavlopoulos to discuss the Greek government-debt crisis, the European migrant crisis, and their NATO alliance. Obama delivered a "legacy speech" at the Stavros Niarchos Foundation Cultural Center, covering the impact of democracy and the country's government-debt crisis, emphasizing the need for debt relief, and attended a state dinner at the Presidential Mansion. While in Athens, he also toured the Acropolis and the Acropolis Museum.	
Germany	Berlin	November 16–18	President Obama traveled to Berlin for the meeting with European leaders of the "Quint": German Chancellor Angela Merkel, French President François Hollande, British Prime Minister Theresa May, Italian Prime Minister Matteo Renzi, and Spanish Prime Minister Mariano Rajoy, in the final such meeting of his presidency. The leaders discussed trade, the Russo-Ukrainian War, the Syrian Civil War, and Islamic State of Iraq and the Levant. President Obama had a private dinner at the Hotel Adlon with Chancellor Merkel.	
Portugal	Terceira Island	November 18	Air Force One refueling stop at Lajes Air Base.	
Peru	Lima	November 18–20	President Obama traveled to Peru to attend the APEC Economic Leaders' Meeting in Lima, his last international trip as president, arriving at Jorge Chávez International Airport. President Obama also hosted a Young Leaders of the Americas Initiative town hall at the Pontifical Catholic University of Peru. On the sidelines of the summit, he held bilateral meetings with Chinese President Xi Jinping, Australian Prime Minister Malcolm Turnbull and Canadian Prime Minister Justin Trudeau.	
Maryland	Bethesda	November 29	President Obama visited wounded soldiers at Walter Reed National Military Medical Center, awarding twelve Purple Heart decorations.	

== December ==
Country/ U.S. state	Areas visited	Dates	Details	Image
Florida	Tampa	December 6	President Obama traveled to MacDill Air Force Base outside of Tampa, Florida, delivering his final speech on national security at the base's Hangar 1.	
Hawaii	Kailua, Kāneʻohe, Waimānalo, Honolulu, Kapolei, ʻAiea	December 16 – January 2, 2017	President Obama and the First Family traveled to Hawaii for their annual vacation, arriving at Joint Base Pearl Harbor–Hickam, where he met with Senator Brian Schatz, Governor David Ige, Mayor of Honolulu Kirk Caldwell and the Commander of United States Pacific Command, Admiral Harry B. Harris Jr. The President later visited Marine Corps Base Hawaii, where he played golf at the Kaneohe Klipper Golf Course. The President later visited the Ho'omaluhia Botanical Garden in Kāneʻohe. The President and the First Family subsequently visited the beach at Bellows Air Force Station. On December 21, the President golfed at the Kapolei Golf Club and dined at Buzz's Lanikai in Kapolei, Hawaii. On December 24, the President and his daughters played the "Breakout Waikiki" escape room game in Waikīkī, Honolulu. On December 27, the President laid a wreath at the USS Arizona Memorial with Japanese Prime Minister Shinzō Abe. The two leaders later spoke at Joint Base Pearl Harbor–Hickam, following a meeting earlier in the morning at Camp H. M. Smith. Following the visit to Pearl Harbor, the President and the First Family went snorkeling at Hanauma Bay State Park.	

== January 2017 ==
Country/ U.S. state	Areas visited	Dates	Details	Image
Virginia	Arlington	January 4	President Obama delivered remarks at the U.S. Department of Defense Commander in Chief Farewell Ceremony at Joint Base Myer–Henderson Hall.	
Illinois	Chicago	January 10	President Obama traveled to Chicago to deliver his farewell address at McCormick Place.	

== See also ==
- List of international presidential trips made by Barack Obama
- Lists of presidential trips made by Barack Obama
