= Cuban dissident movement =

Political movement in Cuba opposed to the communist government

A variant of the Cuban flag with lighter blue stripes used by some opposition groups

The Cuban dissident movement (Movimiento disidente cubano), also known as the Cuban democracy movement (Movimiento democratico cubano) or simply the Cuban opposition (Oposición cubana), is a political movement in Cuba whose for aim is to start a democratic transition in Cuba. It differs from the early opposition to Fidel Castro which occurred from 1959 to 1968, and instead consists of the internal opposition movement birthed by the founding of the Cuban Committee for Human Rights in 1976. This opposition later became an active social movement during the Special Period in the 1990s, as various civic organizations began jointly calling for a democratic transition in Cuba, which later escalated into common protests in 2021 and 2024–2026. The movement is made up of various actors, from conservative democrats who favor free market economics to left-leaning social democrats and democratic socialists. All activists typically agree on the need for expanding democratic rights, and some level of legal free enterprise.

Scholars Aviva Chomsky, Barry Carr, Alfredo Prieto claim that their 2019 polling shows few Cubans are familiar with dissident leaders or propositions, mostly because top dissidents focus their efforts on demanding the release of friends and relatives from jail, and not on organizing mass movements for general freedoms. They also claim being a dissident is difficult to do in public, because a public dissident group would be "quickly and firmly repressed by security forces". According to the Harvard International Review, dissident groups are weak and usually infiltrated by Cuban state security. Media is totally state-controlled, thus dissidents find it difficult to organize and "Many of their leaders have shown enormous courage in defying the regime. Yet, time and again, the security apparatus has discredited or destroyed them. They do not represent a major threat to the regime."

Some dissident groups in the Cuban diaspora received both funding and assistance from the U.S. Intelligence Community during the Cold War, which has caused the Communist Party of Cuba to allege that most dissidents are part of a United States strategy to covertly destabilize the Party's control over the country.

== Background ==
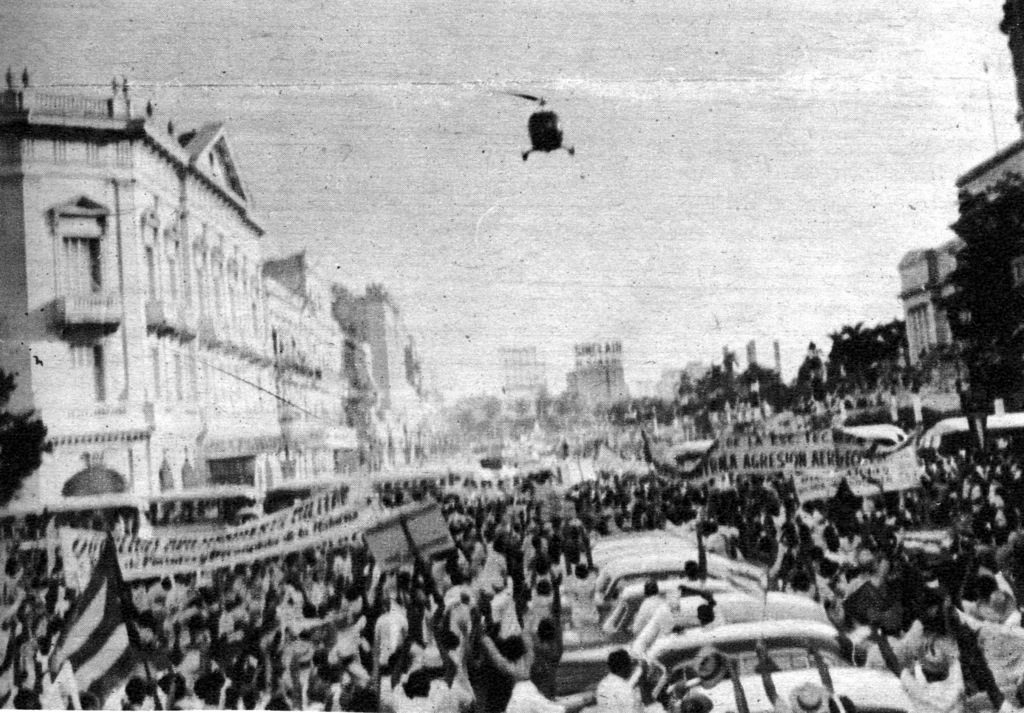
Diario de La Marina, the most popular newspaper in Cuba, became the target of the Communist uprising in 1959, after it had published articles critical of Fidel Castro. In May 1960, a mob attacked the newspaper.

=== Democratic decline ===
Soon after the Cuban Revolution in 1959, Fidel Castro announced in a speech given on April 9, 1959, that the elections which were promised to occur after the revolution were to be delayed. On May Day, 1960, Fidel Castro would outright condemn elections as corrupt, and cancel all future elections.

In the beginning of 1959, Cuban printers unions began demanding that newspapers which were critical of the government add a "coletilla" ("clarification") next to articles that rebuked critical comments in the articles. By the end of 1960, according to political scientist Paul H. Lewis, all opposition newspapers had been closed down and all radio and television stations were under state control. In nearly all areas of government, loyalty to the regime became the primary criterion for all appointments.

=== Human rights in contemporary Cuba ===
According to a 2006 Human Rights Watch report, the Marxist-Leninist Cuban government represses nearly all forms of political dissent. This control is accomplished by various means:

- The media is operated under the Cuban Communist Party’s Department of Revolutionary Orientation, which "develops and coordinates propaganda strategies".
- A Human Rights Watch 1999 report on Cuba notes that Cuba has penalties for anyone who "threatens, libels or slanders, defames, affronts (injuria) or in any other way insults (ultraje) or offends, with the spoken word or in writing, the dignity or decorum of an authority, public functionary, or his agents or auxiliaries". There are even harsher penalties for those who show contempt for the President of the Council of the State, the President of the National Assembly of Popular Power, the members of the Council of the State or the Council of Ministers, or the Deputies of the National Assembly of the Popular Power.
- There is a three-month to one-year sentence for anyone who "publicly defames, denigrates, or scorns the Republic's institutions, the political, mass, or social organizations of the country, or the heroes or martyrs of the nation".
- Cubans are not allowed to produce, distribute or store publications without informing the authorities.
- Social dangerousness, defined as violations of socialist morality, can warrant "pre-criminal measures" and "therapeutic measures".
- Regarding institutions, the Human Rights Watch report notes that the Interior Ministry has principal responsibility for monitoring the Cuban population for signs of dissent.
- In 1991, two new mechanisms for internal surveillance and control emerged. Communist Party leaders organized the Singular Systems of Vigilance and Protection (Sistema Unico de Vigilancia y Protección, SUVP). Rapid Action Brigades (Brigadas de Acción Rapida, also referred to as Rapid Response Brigades, or Brigadas de Respuesta Rápida) observe and control dissidents. The regime also "maintains academic and labor files (expedientes escolares y laborales) for each citizen, in which officials record actions or statements that may bear on the person's loyalty to the regime. Before advancing to a new school or position, the individual's record must first be deemed acceptable".

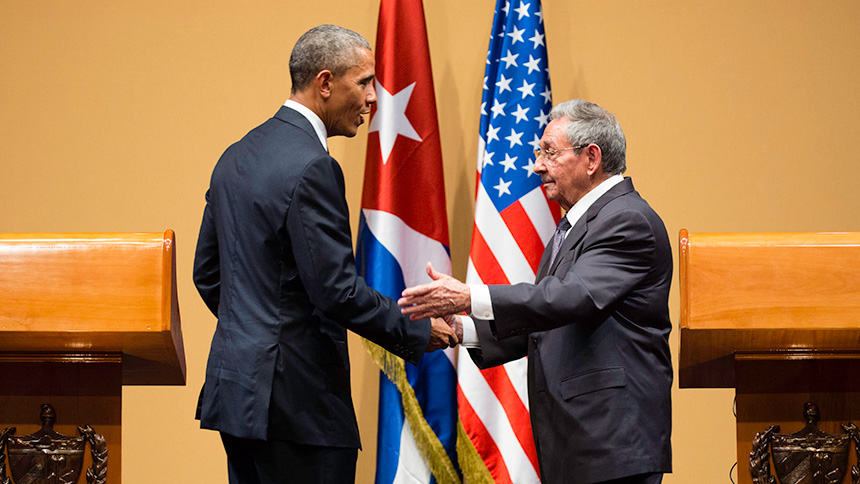
Jorge Luis García Pérez assailed the Cuban thaw as a capitulation to the Castro's regime

The island had the second highest number of imprisoned journalists in the world in 2008, second only to the People's Republic of China, according to the Committee to Protect Journalists (CPJ), an international press organization. The 2009 paper Can Cuba Change? in the National Endowment for Democracy's Journal of Democracy states that about nine-tenths of the populace forms an economically and politically oppressed underclass and "Using the principles of democracy and human rights to unite and mobilize this vast, dispossessed majority in the face of a highly repressive regime is the key to peaceful change". Working people are a critical source of discontent. The only legal trade union is controlled by the government and strikes are banned. Afro-Cuban dissidents have also risen, fueled by racism in Cuba.

In 2012, Amnesty International warned that repression of Cuban dissidents was on the rise over the past two years, citing the Wilmar Villar hunger strike death, as well as the arrests of prisoners of conscience Yasmin Conyedo Riveron, Yusmani Rafael Alvarez Esmori, and Antonio Michel and Marcos Máiquel Lima Cruz. The Cuban Commission of Human Rights reported that there were 6,602 detentions of government opponents in 2012, up from 4,123 in 2011.

In 2024, Cuba was described as one of only four "authoritarian regimes" in the Americas by The Economist's 2024 Democracy Index alongside Venezuela, Haiti, and Nicaragua. The military of Cuba is a central organization; it controls 60 percent of the economy and is Raúl Castro's base.

== History ==
=== Old opposition ===
==== Emergence ====
While an anti-Castro opposition had existed since 1959, it concluded around 1968, with the total consolidation of political authority by Fidel Castro. The rise of a human rights focused opposition within Cuba occurred later with the founding of the Cuban Commission for Human Rights in 1976.

In 1987, the Cuban Commission for Human Rights and National Reconciliation, headed by Elizardo Sánchez, demanded a plebiscite and gathered 11,000 signatures for their request. This marked a major shift among dissidents, to start demanding total political change, rather than minor political reforms.

In 1997, a collection of dissident scholars including Félix Bonne, René Gómez Manzano, Marta Beatriz Roque, and Vladimiro Roca, known as the "gang of four", authored a paper titled The Homeland Belongs To Us All which demanded free speech and plural elections. The "gang of four" were immediately arrested, and spent several years in prison.

==== Black Spring ====
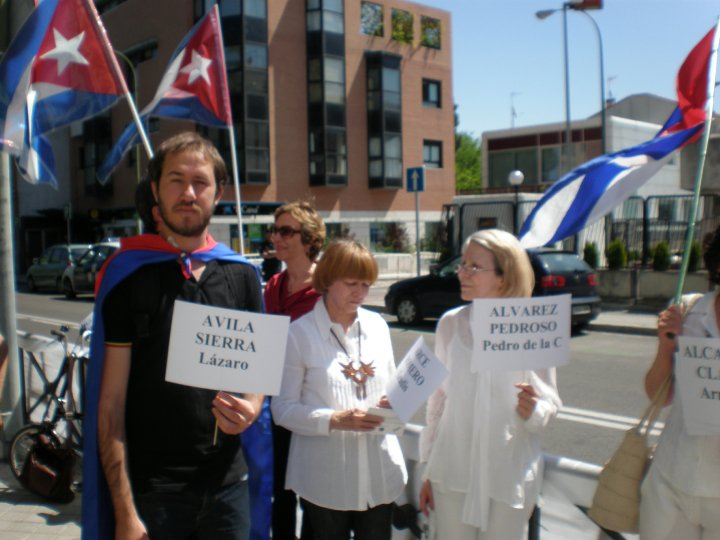
2012 protest in Madrid against the "Black Spring" crackdown

During the "Black Spring" in 2003, the regime imprisoned 75 dissidents, including 29 journalists. Their cases were reviewed by Amnesty International who officially adopted them as prisoners of conscience. To the original list of 75 prisoners of conscience resulting from the wave of arrests in spring 2003, Amnesty International added four more dissidents in January 2004. They had been arrested in the same context as the other 75 but did not receive their sentences until much later. These prisoners have since been released in the face of international pressure. Tripartite talks between the Cuban government, the Catholic Church in Cuba and the Spanish government were initiated in spring 2010 in reaction to the controversial death of political prisoner Orlando Zapata Tamayo in February 2010 following a hunger strike amid reports of massive abuse at the hands of prison staff. These negotiations resulted in a July 2010 agreement that all remaining prisoners of the 'Group of 75' would be freed. Spain offered to receive those prisoners who would agree to be released and immediately exiled together with their families. Of the 79 prisoners of conscience 56 were still behind bars at the time of the agreement. Of the total group, 21 are still living in Cuba today whereas the others are in exile, most of them in Spain. The final two prisoners were released on 23 March 2011.

==== June 2010 letter to United States Congress ====
On Thursday, 10 June 2010, seventy-four of Cuba's dissidents signed a letter to the United States Congress in support of a bill that would lift the US travel ban for Americans wishing to visit Cuba. The signers include blogger Yoani Sanchez and hunger striker Guillermo Farinas, as well as Elizardo Sanchez, head of Cuba's most prominent human rights group and Miriam Leiva, who helped found the Damas de Blanco, or Ladies in White, a group of wives and mothers of jailed dissidents. The letter supports a bill introduced on 23 February by Rep. Collin Peterson, a Minnesota Democrat, that would bar the president from prohibiting travel to Cuba or blocking transactions required to make such trips. It also would bar the White House from stopping direct transfers between US and Cuban banks. The signers stated that:

We share the opinion that the isolation of the people of Cuba benefits the most inflexible interests of its government, while any opening serves to inform and empower the Cuban people and helps to further strengthen our civil society.

The Center for Democracy in the Americas, a Washington-based group supporting the bill, issued a press release stating that "74 of Cuba's most prominent political dissidents have endorsed the Peterson-Moran legislation to end the travel ban and expand food exports to Cuba because in their words it is good for human rights, good for alleviating hunger, and good for spreading information and showing solidarity with the Cuban people. Their letter answers every argument the pro-embargo forces use to oppose this legislation. This, itself, answers the question 'who is speaking for the Cuban people in this debate?' - those who want to send food and Americans to visit the island and stand with ordinary Cubans, or those who don't. If Cuba's best known bloggers, dissidents, hunger strikers, and other activists for human rights want this legislation enacted, what else needs be said?" The Center also hosts English as well as the Spanish version of the letter signed by the 74 dissidents.

=== New dissent era ===
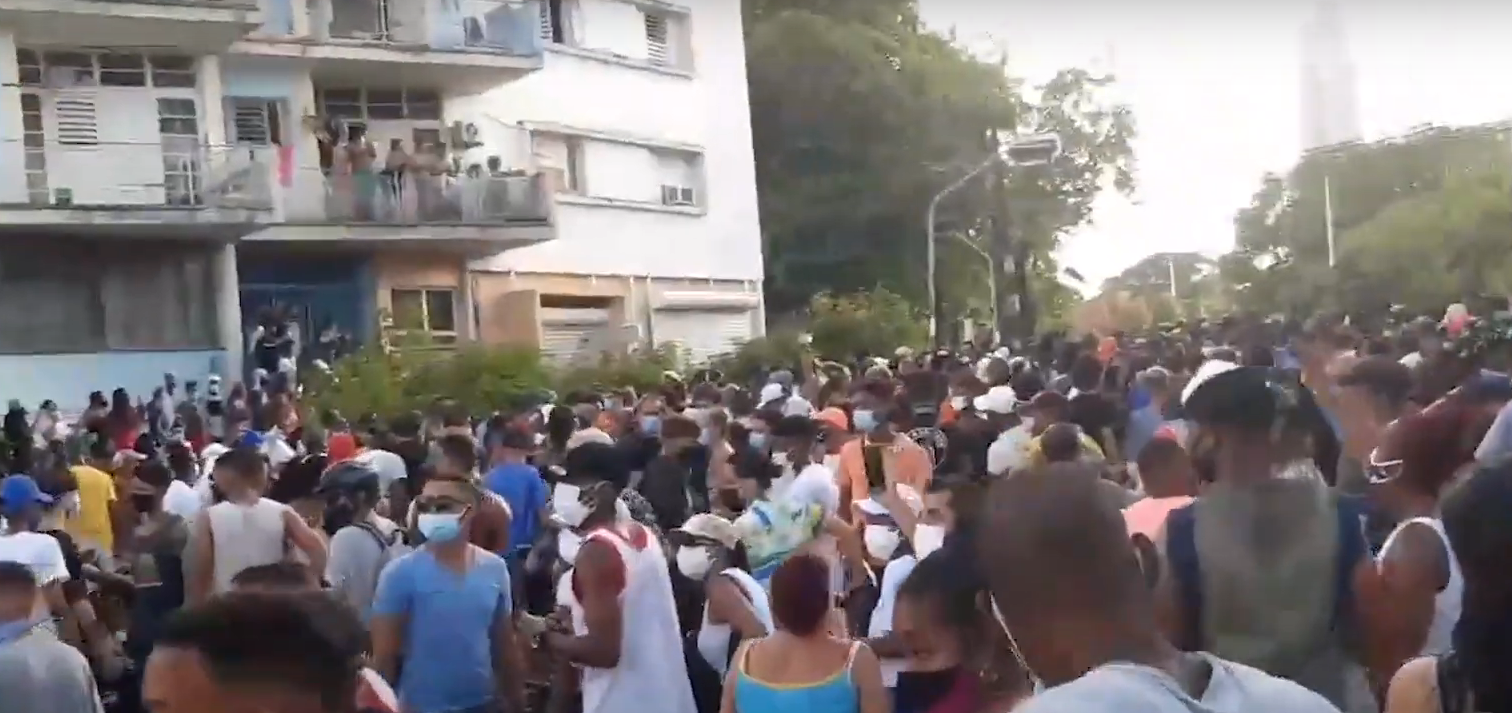
Anti-government protesters in Havana on 11 July 2021

==== 2021 Cuban protests ====
Mass protests erupted in Cuba on 11 July 2021.

==== 2024-present Cuban protests and 2026 crisis ====
Food shortage, power outages, and media censorship (including new media, such as the internet) sparked a new wave of protests in 2024, with major protests taking place on 17-18 March and 18-22 October. On 3 January 2026, the United States kidnapped Nicolás Maduro, President of Cuban ally Venezuela since 2013 and successor to Hugo Chávez, and enforced a blockade on Cuba the following month, leading to the start of a fuel shortage and economic crisis. As of March 2026, protests have resumed on the island, but have been primarily aimed at the power outages and diminishing quality of life since the beginning of the crisis.

== Dissidents ==
=== Independent bloggers ===
The Foreign Policy magazine named Yoani Sánchez one of the 10 Most Influential Intellectuals of Latin America, the only woman on the list. An article in El Nuevo Herald by Ivette Leyva Martinez, speaks to the role played by Yoani Sanchez and other young people, outside the Cuban opposition and dissidence movements, in working towards a free and democratic Cuba today:

Amid the paralysis of the dissident movement, bloggers, with Yoani Sánchez in the lead, rebel artists such as the writer Orlando Luís Pardo, and musicians such as Gorki Aguila are a promising sign of growing civic resistance to the Cuban dictatorship. And "el castrismo", without doubt, has taken note. Will they succeed in sparking a popular movement, or at least consciousness of the need for democracy in Cuba? Who knows. The youngest sector of Cuban society is the one least committed to the dictatorship but at the same time the most apolitical, the one most permeated with political skepticism, escapism, and other similar "isms". It would seem, however, that after 50 years of dictatorship, public rejection of that regime is taking on more original and independent forms. Finally, a breeze of fresh, hopeful air.

On 29 March 2009, at Tania Bruguera's performance where a podium with an open mic was staged for people to have one minute of uncensored public speech, Sánchez was among people to publicly criticize censorship in Cuba and said that "the time has come to jump over the wall of control". The government condemned the event. Sánchez was then placed under surveillance by the Cuban police.

=== Notable people ===
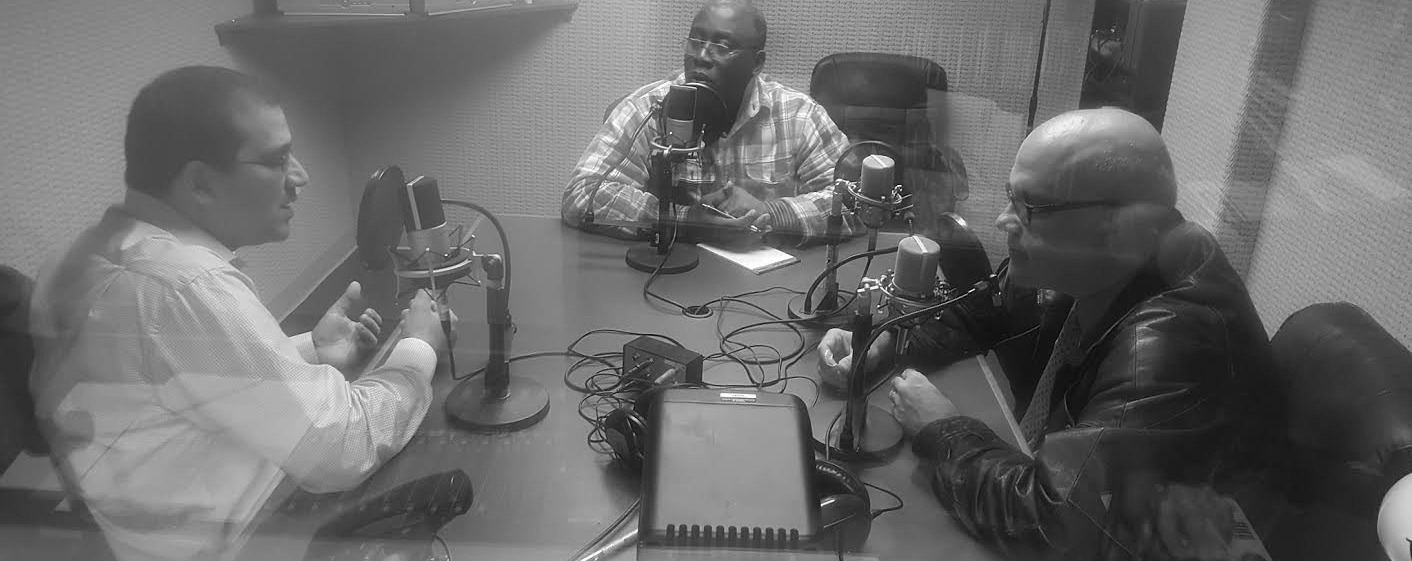
Antonio Rodiles, Jorge Luis García Pérez and Orlando Gutierrez-Boronat in 2017

- Manuel Vázquez Portal, a poet, writer, and a journalist, received the 2003 CPJ International Press Freedom Award.
- Héctor Maseda Gutiérrez, a jailed nuclear engineer and journalist, received the 2008 CPJ International Press Freedom Award.
- Antonio Rodiles
- Carlos Franqui, former Castro supporter who became the Cuban regime's opponent
- Orlando Gutierrez-Boronat
- Carlos Amel Oliva
- Anyer Antonio Blanco
- José Ignacio Rivero, editor of Diario de la Marina, an independent newspaper closed on 12 May 1960
- Huber Matos, a revolutionary and former Castro supporter imprisoned from 1959 to 1979, then exiled to the United States
- Jorge Luis García Pérez (known as Antúnez) was jailed for criticizing communism and spent 17 years in jail until released in 2007. As the longest-serving jailed black dissident when he was released, he has been referred to as Cuba's Nelson Mandela. Nelson Mandela, on the other hand, was an outspoken supporter of the Cuban Revolution and Fidel Castro, crediting him with the liberation of his country.
- Félix Navarro Rodríguez, one of the prisoners of the Black Spring, arrested multiple times.
- Oswaldo Payá, considered dissident leader until his death in 2012, former chairman of the Christian Liberation Movement.
- Rosa Maria Payá, daughter of Oswaldo Payá, chairman of the Christian Liberation Movement.
- José Daniel Ferrer, considered dissident leader since 2012, chairman of the Patriotic Union of Cuba.
- Luis Manuel Otero Alcántara, known performance artist and dissident
- Canek Sánchez Guevara, grandson of Che Guevara.
- Jorge Mas Canosa (1939–1997), founder of the Cuban American National Foundation
- Jesús Permuy, human rights activist, founder of the Human Rights Center of Miami
- Gorki Águila, musician
- Guillermo Fariñas
- Orlando Zapata Tamayo, activist
- Pedro Luis Boitel, poet who died on a hunger strike
- Berta Soler, leader of Ladies in White
- Óscar Elías Biscet
- Raúl Rivero
- Félix Bonne
- René Gómez Manzano
- Marta Beatriz Roque
- Vladimiro Roca

=== Political organizations ===
There are a number of opposition parties and groups that campaign for political change in Cuba. Though amendments to the Cuban Constitution of 1992 decriminalized the right to form political parties other than the Communist Party of Cuba, these parties are not permitted to engage in public political activities on the island.

- Center for a Free Cuba, based in the United States and supported by the US government.
- Christian Liberation Movement, a movement and group of Catholics that was founded by Oswaldo Payá. They are notable for starting the Varela Project.
- Cuban Democratic Directorate, a non-governmental organization aligned with the Centrist Democrat International and International Democratic Union.
- Ladies in White received the Sakharov Prize for Freedom of Thought from the European Parliament in 2005.
- Lawton Foundation, an organization to promote the "study, defense, and denunciation of human rights inside Cuba". The group was formed by Oscar Elías Biscet.
- Patriotic Union of Cuba – Founded by José Daniel Ferrer, a former member of the Christian Liberation Movement, it has defined itself as a civic organization that advocates for a peaceful but firm fight against any repression of civil liberties in the Republic of Cuba.
- Rosa Parks Feminist Movement for Civil Rights
- San Isidro Movement, a group of writers, artists, academics and journalists protesting restriction on freedom of expression, beginning in 2018.
- Yo No Coopero Con La Dictadura (English: I Do Not Cooperate with the Dictatorship), a civil resistance organization.
- Assembly of the Cuban Resistance

== Hunger strikes ==
Pedro Luis Boitel, a poet who died on hunger strike

On 3 April 1972, Pedro Luis Boitel, an imprisoned poet and dissident, declared himself on hunger strike. After 53 days on hunger strike without receiving medical assistance and receiving only liquids, he died of starvation on 25 May 1972. His last days were related by his close friend, poet Armando Valladares. He was buried in an unmarked grave in the Cólon Cemetery in Havana.

Guillermo Fariñas did a seven-month hunger strike to protest against the extensive Internet censorship in Cuba. He ended it in autumn 2006 with severe health problems, although still conscious. Reporters Without Borders awarded its cyber-freedom prize to Fariñas in 2006.

Jorge Luis García Pérez (known as Antúnez) has done hunger strikes. In 2009, following the end of his 17-year imprisonment, Antúnez, his wife Iris, and Diosiris Santana Pérez started a hunger strike to support other political prisoners. Leaders from Uruguay, Costa Rica, and Argentina declared their support for Antúnez.

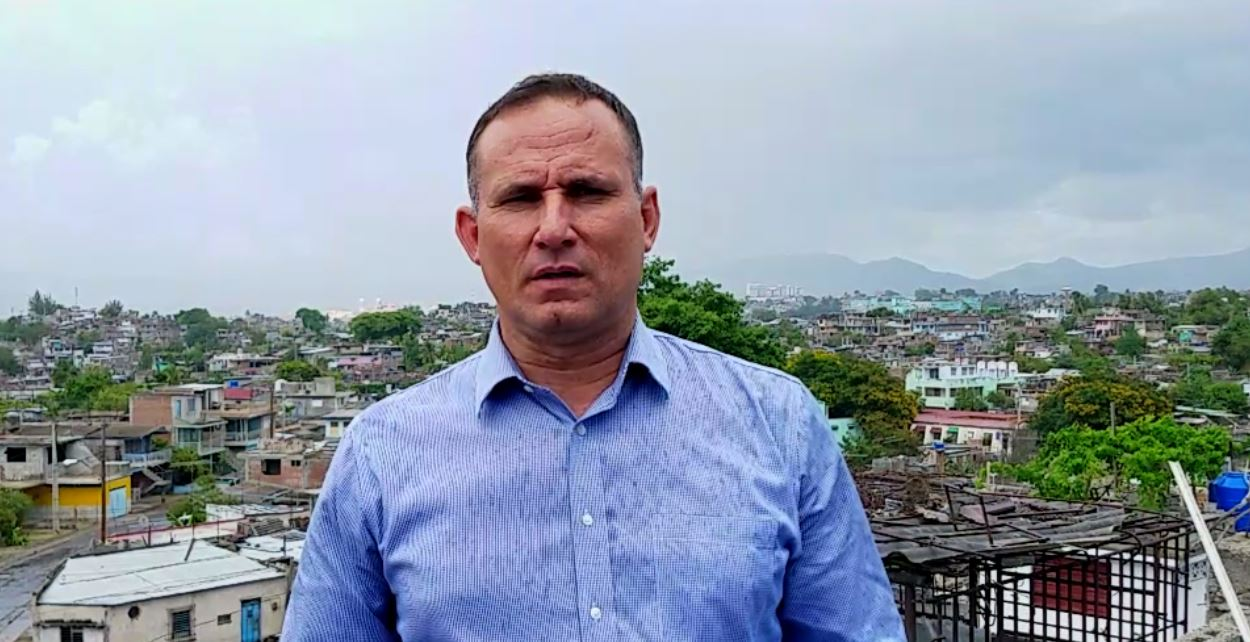
A famous Cuban opposition leader José Daniel Ferrer

Orlando Zapata Tamayo, an imprisoned activist and dissident, died while on a hunger strike for more than 80 days. Zapata went on the strike in protest against the Cuban government for having denied him the choice of wearing white dissident clothes instead of the designated prisoner uniform, as well as denouncing the living conditions of other prisoners. As part of his claim, Zapata was asking for the prisoners conditions to be comparable to those that Fidel Castro had while incarcerated after his 1953 attack against the Moncada Barracks.

In 2012, Wilmar Villar Mendoza died after a 50+ day hunger strike.

== Funding ==
Cuban dissident groups have received millions in funding from the USA government and are considered by the Cuban government to be part of the United States strategy for Cuba to destabilize the country.

Vice Foreign Minister Carlos Fernandez de Cossio told Reuters in 2022:

"In any nation, [having people who act as foreign government agents] is illegal, That is precisely what the United States is trying to promote in Cuba today . [The U.S.A is] depressing the standard of living of the population and at the same time pouring millions of US taxpayer dollars into urging people to act against the [Cuban] government,"

== See also ==
- 2021 Cuban protests
- 2024 Cuban protests
- Human rights in Cuba
- Censorship in Cuba
- Civil resistance
- Darsi Ferrer Ramírez
- Antonio Rodiles
- Canek Sánchez Guevara
- Cuba de ayer – anti-communist view of pre-revolution Cuba promoted by Cuban exiles
- Next year in Havana – anti-communist catchphrase among exiled Cuban dissidents
