= Raymundo Perdigon Brito =

Cuban journalist

Raymundo Perdigón Brito
- Occupation: Journalist

Raymundo Perdigón Brito is an independent Cuban journalist. In December 2006, he was sentenced to four years in prison for "Social Dangerousness".

In 2006, Perdigon was acting as a freelance journalist. He had published articles on foreign websites that documented government abuses. On 17 November 2006, he and his sister Ana Margarita Perdigon founded the Yayabo Press, a news agency, with some other journalists. On 29 November 2006, Perdigon was arrested and told he would be imprisoned if he continued reporting. He refused. At a summary trial six days later, on 5 December 2006, he was sentenced to four years in prison for "social dangerousness". (Note: The Cuban government often charges journalists with "pre-criminal social danger". Although they have not committed any crime, they are imprisoned as potential threats to society. Other journalists imprisoned under this charge include Oscar Sanchez Madan and Ramon Velazquez Toranso.) When his family was leaving the courthouse, they were attacked and beaten up. Perdigon's father was hospitalized. Ana Margarita Perdigon replaced him as editor of the Yayabo Press.

Perdigon was one of three Cuban journalists who were given long prison sentences in 2006, the other two being Armando Andrés Betancourt Reina and Guillermo Espinosa Rodriguez. A report by published by Human Rights Watch in November 2009 said he had repeatedly been beaten by the guards and placed in solitary confinement.

In February 2009, the Inter American Press Association (IAPA) called on the Cuban government to release 25 journalists who were being detained for independent reporting, including Raymundo Perdigon Brito. Perdigón was released from prison on 24 November 2010.

He denounced the poor living conditions in the Nieves Morejón prison in the Sancti Spíritus province, where he had been held. He said he would continue to fight for freedom.
