= Agreement for Democracy =

The Agreement for Democracy was ratified in Miami on February 20, 1998, by pro-democracy organizations in Cuba and in Miami dedicated to promoting "liberty and democracy" in Cuba. More than 120 organizations, both in Cuba and abroad, have signed it.

== Stated Goals ==
The Agreement for Democracy consists of the following ten planks:

1. Guarantee the people's participation in the decisions of the nation through the exercise of universal, direct, and secret voting to elect its representatives, and the right to seek public office.
2. Immediately issue a general amnesty for the liberation of all political prisoners, including those who have been sentenced for fictitious common crimes, and cancel the pending political causes against Cubans in exile, so as to facilitate their return to the homeland and their reintegration into the national society.
3. Organize an independent, impartial and professional judiciary.
4. Recognize and protect the freedom of expression, of the press, of association, of assembly, of peaceful demonstration, profession and religion.
5. Protect the Cuban people from arbitrary expulsion from their homes as well as against all forms of detention, search, confiscation or arbitrary aggression, and from violation of their correspondence, documents and other communications, and defend all Cubans’ right to privacy and honor.
6. Immediately legalize all political parties and other organizations and activities of civil society.
7. Refer to the Constitution of 1940, when applicable, during the transition period and convoke free elections with the supervision of international organizations within a time period not greater than one year, for a Constituent Congress which will establish a Constitution and which, during its existence, shall have authority to legislate as well as to oversee the executive. Having thus achieved democratic legitimacy, it shall call general elections in accordance with the provisions of the Constitution.
8. Recognize and protect the freedom of economic activity; the right to private property; the right to unionize, to bargain collectively and to strike; the Cuban people's right to genuine participation in their economic development; access to public health and education, and initiate the reestablishment of civic values in education.
9. Take immediate steps to protect Cuba's environmental security and protect and rescue the national patrimony.
10. Propitiate and guarantee the professionalism and political neutrality of the Armed Forces and create forces of public order whose rules of conduct shall adjust to the principles of this Agreement.

== See also ==
- Cuba-United States relations
- Opposition to Fidel Castro
