= Porno para Ricardo =

Cuban rock band

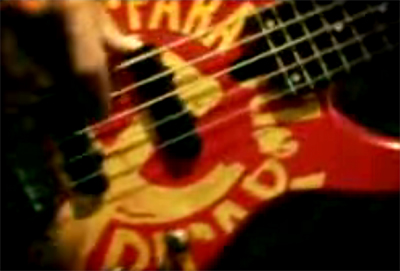
- Logo of the Group.

Background information
- Origin: Havana, Cuba
- Genres: Alterlatino; Latino punk
- Years active: 1998–present
- Label: La Paja
- Members: Gorki Águila; Lia Villares; Renay Kairus; Ciro Díaz
- Past members: William Retureta; Hebert Domínguez; Luis David González; Oscar Pita
- Website: pornopararicardo.bandcamp.com

Porno para Ricardo (English: Porn for Richard) is a Cuban rock band founded in 1998. It is considered to be one of the most visible examples of young Cubans disagreement with the Castro's rule.

Their lyrics are mostly about politics and contemporary Cuban society, and are harshly critical of the Cuban government. Their lyrics are frequently very explicit and strongly critical of Castro.

The band was originally well received by the Cuban cultural scene. However, in 2003 Gorki Águila, the leader of the band, was arrested under drugs charges at a music festival in Pinar del Rio. He was imprisoned for 4 years only to be released after serving 2 years in prison. After his release, his lyrics became increasingly political. In March 2004 Gorki was nominated for the British Index on Censorship prize in the category "Music". The critical stance of the group against the regime accelerated only to be prohibited and their website cancelled the same year.

In August 2008 Águila was arrested by the Cuban police with the charge of dangerousness, which allows them to detain people whom they think they are likely to commit crimes. The charge carries a penalty of up to four years in prison. He was eventually ordered to pay a $30 fine (2 months salary) for the lesser offense of public disorder which he paid after some hesitation in coins, after prosecutors dropped the more serious charge following intense international pressure after broad media coverage. This is an unprecedented event in Cuban jurisprudence; the communist government is usually strict about punishment given to independent journalists and other dissident voices.

The group organizes a small recording studio for other prohibited groups that cannot play in Cuba called Paja Recolds.

== 2011 First Concert Abroad - Prague ==
In 2011 the group held its first concert abroad at the United Islands Festival in Prague. However, the members of the group were prohibited to travel from Cuba (did not receive exit permit). Only Gorki Águila could participate at the festival due to his temporary stay with his mother in Mexico at the time of invitation. The rest of the band was complemented by Alaverdi, a Prague-based band of Lithuanian origins.

A photo of the concert with the phrase "Music Does not Ask for Permission" was printed as a postcard and send in thousands to the personalities of the Cuban Communist party including Raul Castrro himself.

== 2013 Political Asylum in Prague ==
In 2013, the group was allowed to travel to Europe. During this occasion William Retureta, the 20 years old drummer of the band, applied for political asylum in the Czech Republic, which he received. He is now living in Prague.

== 2014 Denial to Leave the country ==
In 2014, the group was again prohibited to leave the country to give concerts in Europe.

== Discography ==
- Rock para las masas cárnicas (Rock for meat masses), featuring a version of the opening theme of a Soviet cartoon of the 1980s, of the story The musicians of Bremen. The cartoon, and the original theme itself, was popular in Cuba; and is remembered by many of those who were born around the 1980s.
- A mí no me gusta la política pero yo le gusto a ella, compañeros (I don't like politics, but she likes me, comrades);
- Soy Porno, soy popular (I am porn, I am popular, resembling the song by David Calzado y La Charanga Habanera:Soy cubano, soy popular I am Cuban, I am Popular)
- Rojo Desteñido (Faded Red)
- Maleconazo Ahora
- 20 años de carrera... delante de la policía (20 years of career... in front of the Police)
- Ataque Sónico (Sonic Attack)
