= Konstantin von Notz =

German lawyer and politician (born 1971)

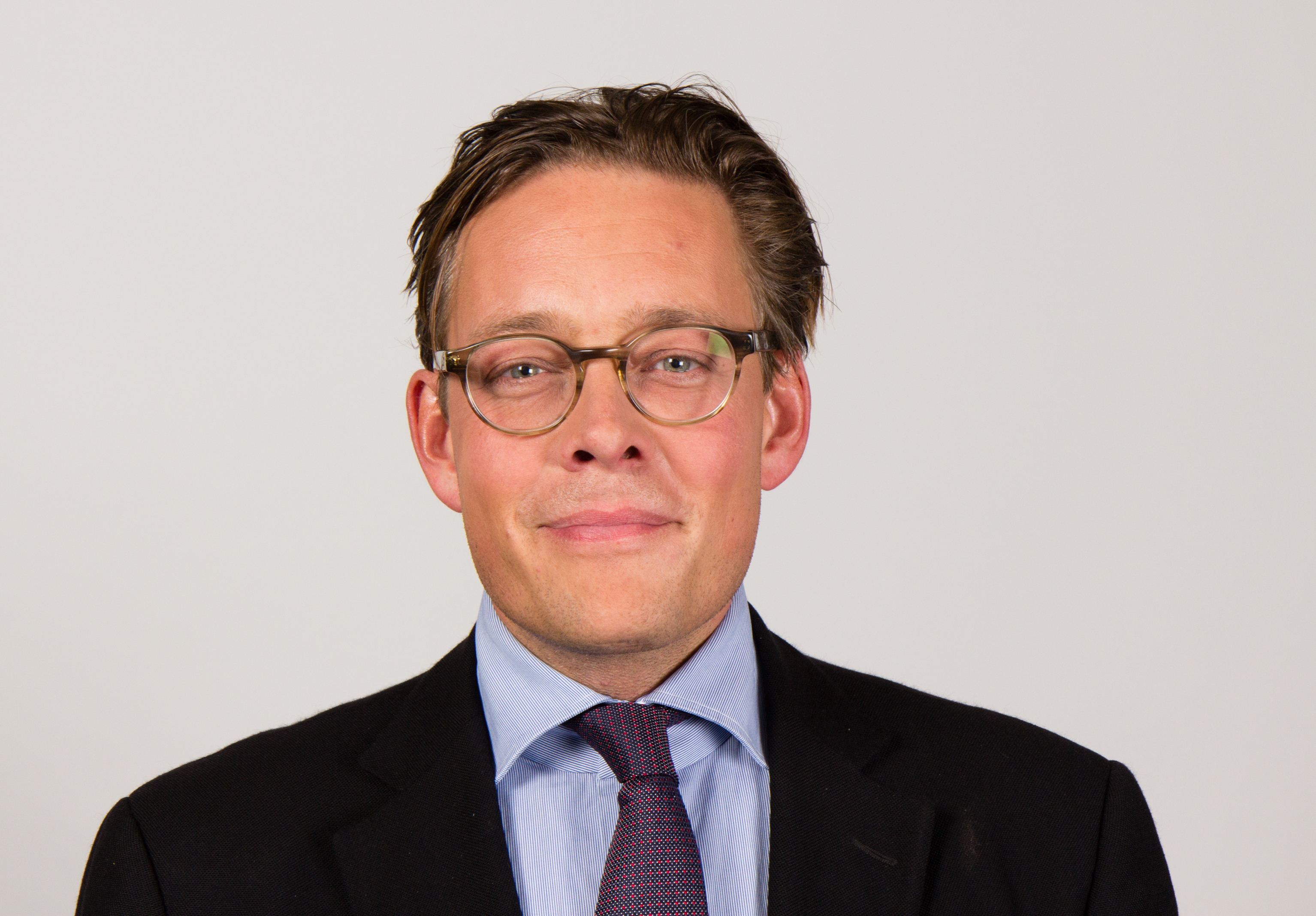
- Von Notz in 2014

Member of the Bundestag
- Incumbent
- Assumed office 27 October 2009
- Constituency: Lauenburg/ Stormarn-Süd, Schleswig-Holstein

Deputy Mayor of Mölln
- Incumbent
- Assumed office June 2013

Personal details
- Born: 21 January 1971 (age 55) Mölln, West Germany
- Party: Alliance 90/The Greens
- Education: Heidelberg University

Konstantin von Notz (born 21 January 1971) is a German lawyer and politician of the Alliance 90/The Greens party who has been a member of the Bundestag since 2009.

== Early life and education ==
Born in Mölln as one of two sons of Friedhelm von Notz, Konstantin grew up in Hamburg and Frankfurt am Main. He studied law at Heidelberg University between 1993 and 1998.

== Political career ==
Von Notz has been a member of the German Bundestag since the 2009 national elections. In his first legislative term from 2009 until 2013, he served on the Committee on Internal Affairs and was his parliamentary group's spokesperson on internal affairs and digital policy.

Following the 2013 elections, von Notz was appointed vice-chairman of his parliamentary group, under the leadership of co-chairs Katrin Göring-Eckardt and Anton Hofreiter. In this capacity, he served as coordinator of the group's legislative initiatives on internal and legal affairs and as spokesperson on digital policy. He also leads the Green Party's parliamentary group within the German Parliamentary Committee investigating the NSA spying scandal and the Committee on the Digital Agenda. Since 2018, he has been a member of the Parliamentary Oversight Panel (PKGr), which provides parliamentary oversight of Germany's intelligence services BND, BfV and MAD. He also joined the Committee on the Election of Judges (Wahlausschuss), which is in charge of appointing judges to the Federal Constitutional Court of Germany.

In addition to his committee assignments, von Notz has been serving as deputy chairman of the Parliamentary Friendship Group for Relations with the Baltic States since 2009.

Under the umbrella of the German parliaments' godparenthood program for human rights activists, von Notz has been raising awareness for the work of persecuted Cuban dissident Antonio Rodiles since 2013.

In the negotiations to form a so-called traffic light coalition of the Social Democrats (SPD), the Green Party and the FDP following the 2021 federal elections, von Notz led his party's delegation in the working group on homeland security and civil rights; his co-chairs from the other parties were Christine Lambrecht and Wolfgang Kubicki.

== Other activities ==
- Stiftung Datenschutz, Member of the Strategic Advisory Board
- Heinrich Böll Foundation, Member of the Members Assembly (since 2009)
- Liquid Democracy, Member of the Board of Trustees (since 2009)
- Otto von Bismarck Foundation, Member of the Board of Trustees
- Transparency International, Member
- Deutsche Telekom, Member of the Data Privacy Advisory Board (2009-2013)
- Zukunftsforum Öffentliche Sicherheit, Chairman of the Advisory Board (2009-2013)
