= Dangerousness =

Dangerousness can refer to:

- Dangerousness (legal), a legal establishment of the risk that a person poses to cause harm
- Social dangerousness, a charge under Cuban law

== See also ==
- Risk
