= Armando Betancourt Reina =

Cuban journalist and author

Armando Andrés Betancourt Reina
- Occupations: Independent journalist, author

Armando Andrés Betancourt Reina is an independent Cuban journalist and author.

== Career ==
In 2006 Betancourt Reina was a reporter for Nueva Prensa Cubana, an independent news agency. He was arrested on 23 May 2006 while watching a forced eviction of poor people in La Guernica, Camagüey, and detained on charges of public disorder. According to the police he had joined a protest against the evictions. After being arrested, Betancourt was at first held in isolation, and could not see his family or lawyers. He was initially sentenced to three years in prison. In June and July 2006 his request to see a Catholic priest was denied by the authorities at Ceramica Rota (Red Ceramic) prison in Camaguey, where he was being held.

He was one of three Cuban journalists who were given long prison sentences in 2006, the other two being Raymundo Perdigon Brito and Guillermo Espinosa Rodriguez. Betancourt said that during his stay in prison guards beat political prisoners, but not in front of witnesses. After beatings they kept the victim in solitary confinement for two or three weeks until their injuries had healed. During his confinement he shared a cell 13 by 16 feet (4.0 by 4.9 m) with 11 others.

At the pretrial hearings that started on 8 February 2007 no defense witnesses were allowed to testify. The court postponed the case for further investigation. On 3 July 2007 he was tried again and sentenced to fifteen months in prison, with time already spent counting towards that sentence. Armando Betancourt Reina was freed on 20 August 2007 after completing his 15-month sentence. After his release Betancourt was told that his phone service would be cut off if he used it for "counter-revolutionary activities."

Some incidents from Betancourt's 2006-2007 prison stay are described in his book Morir sin Patria, which describes the experiences of people in a society dominated by lack of civil liberties.

== Bibliography ==
- Julio Antonio Aleaga Pesant; Armando Betancourt Reina; Francisco Blanco Sanabria; et al. (2006). Voces De Cambio: Nueva Literature Cubana. Miami, FL: Ediciones El Cambio. ISBN 9709418734.
- Betancourt Reina, Armando Andrés (April 2011). Morir Sin Patri. Palibrio. ISBN 978-1-61764-889-2.
- Simia Dei ISBN 978-1-5065-2664-5
