= 2024–2026 Cuban protests =

Protests against the Cuban government

- Part of 2024-2026 Cuba blackouts
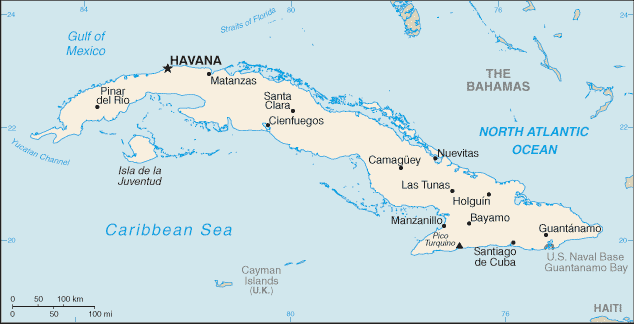
- Map of Cuba
- Date: 17 March 2024 – 3 January 2026 (Round 1); 6 February 2026 – present (Round 2); Major protests: 17-18 March 2024; 18 October 2024 – 22 October 2024; 14 March 2026
- Location: Cuba
- Caused by: Food shortage; Power outages; Inflation; Censorship and internet censorship; Authoritarianism; Human rights abuse
- Goals: Access to food and electric power; overthrow of communist rule
- Methods: Street protests; Marches; Cacerolazo; Arson; Online activism
- Status: Failed for the first round of protests, and ongoing for the second round: Internet and mobile networks partially shut down; Subsumed by the 2026 Cuban crisis

Parties
Opposition groups: Anti-government protesters	Government of Cuba: Communist Party of Cuba; National Revolutionary Police; Pro-government counterprotesters

Lead figures
No centralized leadership Some prominent figures: José Daniel Ferrer; María Payá Acevedo; Luis Manuel Otero Alcántara	Miguel Díaz-Canel; Salvador Valdés Mesa; Manuel Marrero Cruz

Casualties
- Arrested: 8

On 17 March 2024, protests began in Cuba, primarily in Santiago de Cuba, the country's second largest city, in protest of food shortages and power outages.

The country experienced what was described as the worst living crisis since the early 1990s. The government blames the U.S. embargo, which it refers to as a "blockade", imposed since 1962 during the early years of the revolutionary regime to power and intensified in 2021 with Cuba's addition to the State Sponsors of Terrorism list. Cuba accused the U.S. of stirring up unrest, an accusation the United States has denied.

== Background ==
On 12 January 2021, then-U.S. President Donald Trump added Cuba to the State Sponsors of Terrorism list, implementing a new series of economic sanctions on the country. The government of Cuba had hoped that Joe Biden would remove Cuba from the list. Biden entirely avoided the issue during his time in office and, according to Cuban governmental sources, did not respond to calls to have a diplomatic meeting to remove Cuba from the list.

In a press release after the start of the protests, the Cuban government called the inclusion of Cuba on the State Sponsors of Terrorism list to be the most egregious element of U.S. sanctions. U.S. Representative Joaquin Castro (D-TX20) called Biden's failure to remove Cuba from the list "a serious missed opportunity that has worsened the lives of everyday Cubans." By being labeled a State Sponsor of Terrorism, new economic sanctions were implemented that discouraged third-party foreign investment, as those companies would be barred from doing business in the United States under the Helms–Burton Act. The inclusion on the list has all but eliminated tourism to Cuba, namely from the European Union.

Since the COVID-19 pandemic, the price of fuel has risen 500%, while most Cuban electricity is generated by oil-burning power plants. Prior to this, Cuba had relied on one of its allies, Venezuela, to sell oil at a discount, and due to the economic crisis in Venezuela, this special relationship had to be ended. Due to the fuel shortages, there are rolling blackouts in some Cuban cities. Cuba also relies on food imports, receiving $7 billion (United States Dollar) per year, and due to the weaker purchasing power of the Cuban peso, purchases almost all imports with foreign currency reserves. These reserves are also used to purchase fuel, which coupled with inflation that left a 18.5% GDP hole, leaves less remaining for food imports. Along with a poorer harvest, Cuba has experienced food shortages.

Weeks before the protests on 7 March, First Secretary of the Communist Party of Cuba Miguel Díaz-Canel sacked his economy minister, Alejandro Gil Fernández, for alleged corruption and mismanagement. That same day, Diario de Cuba, a publication funded by the National Endowment for Democracy, reported that there is an extensive black market for cat meat as basic goods became increasingly scarce.

== Response ==
The government provided rice and milk, while dissatisfaction continued. Cuba reached out to the World Food Programme for powdered milk and other items to help relieve the shortages.

First Secretary Díaz-Canel wrote on X, "Mediocre politicians and online terrorists lined up from South Florida to heat up the streets of #Cuba with interventionist messages and calls for chaos. They were left wanting." In a press release the Cuban government claimed that the whole of South Florida's "only livelihood is the industry of aggression against Cuba."

Cuba's state-run telecommunications company curtailed internet access in response to the protests. According to Cuban-born U.S. Representative Carlos A. Giménez (R-FL28), the Cuban government mobilized secret police to prevent protesters from organizing as well, both actions done against the 2021 Cuban protests. He called on the Biden administration to provide satellite internet to protesters. In response, a State Department spokesperson said, "U.S. regulations allow for certain internet-based services to support the Cuban people."

María Payá Acevedo, the daughter of assassinated dissident Oswaldo Payá and one of the leading Cuban opposition figures living in exile in Miami, announced that her Cuba Decide initiative is calling on international leaders to stand with and support the protesters to ensure a peaceful transition to democracy. Cuba Decide has outlined a four step plan to implement democracy, the first is to recognize and guarantee the protection of human rights for all Cubans, the second is "a binding plebiscite implementing electoral and transparency guarantees" to end the one party state, the third is to "initiate a transition process that establishes democratic institutions" and lastly "free and multiparty elections" to establish a new government.

== 2025 ==
The Cuban Observatory of Conflicts indicated that 11,268 protests, complaints and critical statements against the dictatorship of Miguel Díaz-Canel were registered in Cuba during 2025.

== 2026 ==
On 6 February 2026, a cacerolazo protest happened during a blackout in Arroyo Naranjo district of Havana.

On 7-8 March 2026, nighttime cacerolazo protests erupted again in Havana.

On 14 March reports from Cuba say that protests erupted in some parts of the Island. The cause were power outages, food shortages, and the worsening economic crisis. In the town of Morón, protesters attacked and vandalized a local Communist Party office during a nighttime protest over blackouts. Some people were arrested by authorities, while Miguel Díaz‑Canel's government warned against further unrest.

On April 7, 2026, hundreds of Cuban women gathered in Havana to decry America's energy embargo imposed by Donald Trump.

During the night from 13 to 14 May 2026, another cacerolazo protest happened in Havana against blackout.

During the night from 2 to 3 June, Cuba experienced protests not only in Havana, but also in Artemisa and Holguín.

== Reactions ==
On 18 March, Havana summoned the highest-ranking U.S. diplomat, business manager Benjamin Ziff. Carlos Fernández de Cossío, the Cuban Deputy Foreign Minister, delivered a note of protest to Ziff denouncing the United States for "interventionist conduct" and "slanderous messages" claiming that the reports on the protest did not reflect "internal affairs of the Cuban reality." United States Department of State spokesman Vedant Patel responded saying "the United States is not behind these protests in Cuba, and the accusation of that is absurd."

U.S. Representative and daughter of Cuban exiles María Elvira Salazar (R-FL27) stated in an interview with The Hill, "I hope this crisis and the protests in Santiago de Cuba expose the failures of communism and lead to an end of the dictatorship." U.S. Senator Rick Scott issued a statement urging his country to stand with the "brave Cuban people".

The U.S. embassy stated, "We urge the Cuban government to respect the human rights of the protesters and attend to the legitimate needs of the Cuban people." Carlos Fernández de Cossío called the statement by the embassy "disrespectful" and an "open interference in Cuba's domestic affairs." Johana Tablada, the top Cuban diplomat in the United States, stated that the American government's goal is "regime change" against the ruling Communist Party.

On 18 March, Russian Deputy Prime Minister, Dmitry Chernyshenko, touted Russia and Cuba's deepening economic ties, celebrating that over 100 Russian companies have started doing business in Cuba and were involved in the heavy industry, energy, banking, agriculture, IT, and tourism sectors. Chernyshenko stated, "Cuba is a reliable Russian ally." Additionally, in 2023, Cuba implemented the Russian Mir payment system.

On 22 March, former U.S. president and 2024 Republican nominee Donald Trump posted a video to Truth Social stating, "I want to express my admiration and support for all of the brave people of Cuba, who are standing up against the vile communist regime, it's not easy and we appreciate it and it's gonna be changed." This has been interpreted as a hint that a regime change in Cuba would be one of his foreign policy positions should he be re-elected.

=== Protests abroad ===
Cuban-Americans living in Miami organized their own protests to show solidarity throughout March. On 17 March, dozens gathered outside the Versailles waving Cuban and American flags. On 19 March, protesters formed a human chain while on 24 March, they organized a march across a park in Little Havana.
