= Guillermo Espinosa Rodríguez =

Guillermo Espinosa Rodríguez is a Cuban nurse, journalist, blogger and human rights activist. In 2006 he was dismissed from his job with the public health service and arrested after reporting on an outbreak of dengue fever. Since then he has been repeatedly arrested for his human rights activities.

Until 2006 Guillermo Espinosa Rodríguez worked as a nurse in the public health service and as a part-time reporter. In October 2005 Espinosa Rodríguez filed a report on an event in Santiago de Cuba attended by 20,000 young people as part of a campaign for the prevention of AIDS. Police tried to remove a participant, but were forced to retreat when the crowd turned against them. In July 2006 Espinosa submitted reports on an outbreak of dengue fever in Santiago de Cuba to the independent agency Agencia de Prensa Libre Oriental (APLO). Shortly afterwards he was dismissed from his job. Cuba suppresses reports of epidemics to avoid disturbing the tourists. Before Espinosa published his reports, the official media had refused to recognize the existence of dengue fever in Cuba. The reports seem to have triggered his arrest.

Espinosa Rodríguez was arrested in October 2006 along with Armando Betancourt Reina and Raymundo Perdigon Brito. In November 2006 he was convicted under article 72 of the Cuban Penal Code in a Santiago de Cuba court on grounds of "social dangerousness." He was sentenced to two years of home confinement. Although he had lost his job with the public health service, Espinosa was told he should find another job with a government department or he would have to serve his house arrest in jail. In a call for Espinosa's release on 8 November 2006, Reporters Without Borders noted that "social dangerousness" meant he might commit a crime although he had not in fact committed any. The authorities could use this charge to imprison anyone they wanted to. In a press release on 29 January 2007 the Office of the Special Rapporteur for Freedom of Expression of the Inter-American Commission on Human Rights noted that Espinosa had been jailed and said it "reiterates its great concern over the systematic and continuous situation of utter and complete disrespect for freedom of thought and expression in Cuba."

In March 2009 Espinosa was working for the Center of Applied Marketing and Political Publicity in Santiago de Cuba. He was detained and then placed under house arrest for his activities on the sixth anniversary of the arrest of 75 activists in the "Black Spring" of 2003. In February 2011 Espinosa was detained for commemorating the death of Orlando Zapata, a political prisoner, one year earlier. He was one of many arrested during marches held across the country. In April 2012 during a papal mass in Santiago de Cuba a dissident named Andrés Carrión Alvarez shouted "down with communism" and was promptly arrested. A scuffle broke out, and Carrión was attacked by a Red Cross stretcher bearer. Espinosa went to Carrión's aid, and was himself arrested for "contempt of authority". At the time, Espinosa was under house arrest for three years for his pro-democracy activities.
