= Canek Sánchez Guevara =

Cuban author and dissident (1974–2015)

- Born: 22 May 1974; Havana, Cuba
- Died: 21 January 2015 (aged 40); Mexico City, Mexico
- Occupations: Writer, musician
- Movement: Cuban dissident movement
- Parents: Alberto Sánchez Hernández (father); Hildita Guevara Gaesa (mother)
- Relatives: Che Guevara (grandfather) Hilda Gadea (grandmother)

Canek Sánchez Guevara (1974–2015) was a Cuban author, photographer, musician and dissident. The grandson of Argentinian revolutionary Che Guevara, he grew up in the upper crust of post-revolutionary Cuban society, but soon became disillusioned with the government of Fidel Castro. After his mother's death, he went into exile in Mexico, where he worked as a writer for Proceso, penning criticisms of the Cuban government from a left-wing anarchist perspective. He died in 2015, following complications with cardiac surgery.

== Biography ==
Canek Sánchez Guevara was born in the Cuban capital of Havana on 22 May 1974. He was the son of Mexican left-wing activist Alberto Sánchez Hernández and Hildita Guevara Gadea, the eldest daughter of the Argentinian revolutionary Che Guevara. He was named after the Kan Ekʼ (Black Serpent), a title for an ancient line of Maya monarchs.

Sánchez Guevara was raised in a mansion in the upscale district of Miramar, where his mother worked at a government propaganda centre. He was taken abroad to study in Italy, Spain and Mexico, before returning to Cuba in 1986. During his teenage years, he came to admire his late grandfather, although he also struggled with the expectation to live up to Che's legacy, as Cubans told him "how to behave, what to do and what to say". As he grew older, Sánchez Guevara became increasingly disillusioned with the government of Fidel Castro, which he likened to a monarchy, due to its repression of dissident activists and artists. He fell into the Havana punk subculture and formed a heavy metal band, which brought him under the watch of the Cuban police. One illegal gig he attended was raided by police, who arrested and conducted a body cavity search on him.

By the time he turned 21, Sánchez Guevara's mother was dying of cancer in a Havana hospital, where the two discussed the state of the Cuban Revolution. Hildita considered the existing regime to have stagnated, but still dreamed of a future "Communist system with a human face". Canek was more pessimistic, declaring that Che would "never would have approved of what has become of this revolution", noting that political repression was much harsher than it was in his grandfather's day. After his mother's death, in 1996, Sánchez Guevara went into self-imposed exile. He settled in the Mexican city of Oaxaca, where he worked as an artist, musician and author.

In his column for the magazine Proceso, he criticised the Cuban regime for not only being anti-democratic, but also for being anti-communist. In October 2004, he wrote in Proceso that: "The Cuban revolution has given birth to a bourgeoisie, to repressive apparatuses meant to defend from the people a bureaucracy very distant from that same people. But above all it has been anti-democratic because of the religious messianism of its leader." He further denounced "the criminalisation of difference, the means of persecution of homosexuals, hippies, free thinkers, trade unionists and poets" and the installation of "a socialist bourgeoisie". He concluded with a declaration that: "All my criticisms of Fidel Castro start from his distancing from libertarian ideas, of his treason committed against the people of Cuba and the frightful system of vigilance established to preserve the State by crushing people." For his criticisms of the Cuban regime, he was insulted and denounced by various pro-Castro activists, including his own aunt Aleida Guevara. He responded by comparing Castroism to religious fanaticism.

In 2006, he wrote that "I’m just a selfish person who aspires to be a free man, an egotist who knows that egotism is part of all of us and [...] that my freedom is only valid if yours is too."

On 21 January 2015, Sánchez Guevara died due to complications with cardiac surgery. In 2016, a number of his books were released posthumously. These included his autobiography Diario sin motocicleta and the novel 33 Revoluciones.

== See also ==
- Anarchism in Cuba
- Anarchism in Mexico

== Works ==
- Sánchez Guevara, Canek (17 October 2004). "Cuba: "Un ideal falsificado"". Proceso (in Spanish). No. 1459.
- Sánchez Guevara, Canek (2016). Diario sin motocicleta (in Spanish). Logroño: Pepitas de Calabaza. ISBN 9788415862628. OCLC 964456979.
- Sánchez Guevara, Canek (2016). 33 Revolutions. Translated by Curtis, Howard. New York City: Europa Editions. ISBN 9781609453480. OCLC 945483048.
- Sánchez Guevara, Canek (2019). Los supervivientes (in Spanish). Barcelona: Penguin Random House. ISBN 9788417906078. OCLC 1129216138.
- Sánchez Guevara, Canek (2020). Confesiones de un artista ensangrentado (in Spanish). Barcelona: Penguin Random House. ISBN 9788417906207. OCLC 1139277967.
