= WFAB (Miami) =

Radio station in Miami (1962–1977)

- Miami–South Miami, Florida; United States
- Broadcast area: Miami metropolitan area
- Frequency: 990 kHz
- Branding: La Fabulosa

Ownership
- Owner: United Broadcasting Company; (United Broadcasting Company of Florida, Inc.)

History
- First air date: February 15, 1962; 64 years ago
- Last air date: February 20, 1977; 49 years ago
- Call sign meaning: Fabulosa

Technical information
- Power: 5,000 watts

WFAB was a radio station in Miami, Florida. Broadcasting on 990 kHz, the station was branded as "La Fabulosa" and served the Cuban community in Miami. It operated from 1962 to 1977, after which its license was revoked by the Federal Communications Commission for billing improprieties.

== History ==
=== Before going on air ===
Louis G. Jacobs obtained the construction permit for a new 5,000-watt radio station to serve Miami and South Miami in 1958, selecting the call sign WFAB for the new station. In 1959, the construction permit was sold to WFAB, Inc., in a sale of 60 percent of the station from Louis G. Jacobs to Harold King. Both parties sold the station for $40,000 to United Broadcasting of Eastern Virginia, Inc., the next year.

While the new station's transmitter was under construction at 7500 SW 107th Avenue in South Miami, vandals stole 2,700 feet (820 m) of coaxial cable from the site.

=== On the air ===
WFAB signed on after years of delays on February 15, 1962, carrying programming for the African American community during the day and Spanish-language fare in the evenings. However, WFAB's Spanish-language programming came to dominate the station's identity. Within months of signing on, it struck a pact with WCKT-TV to air a Spanish simulcast of WCKT's 6 and 11 p.m. newscasts.

As Miami's Cuban population boomed, ratings for WFAB and WQBA (1140 AM) rose: WFAB was third in the market in 1970 and WQBA fifth, putting two Spanish-language stations in the top 5. In 1971, newsman Óscar Angulo was arrested by the United States Coast Guard along with three other exiles for planning a commando raid on Cuba. The station maintained an extensive news service, including two mobile units, because, in the words of news editor Tomás Regalado, "Cubans have so many rallies and pickets that we need on-the-scene reporting." WFAB rallied the Hispanic community in Miami to aid Nicaragua after the country was damaged by a major earthquake in 1972, with the station presenting the consul general of the country a $75,000 check garnered from donations to the station by listeners. In 1973, Regalado recorded and aired a 20-minute phone conversation with the mother of dead dissident Pedro Luis Boitel, unusual because foreign telephone calls out of Cuba were closely monitored. By 1975, the station aired a four-hour morning newscast.

=== License renewal fight and closure ===
Even as WFAB demonstrated its ability to rally the Hispanic community in Miami, an existential threat formed at the Federal Communications Commission (FCC), one that hung over the entire United Broadcasting Company group, controlled by Richard Eaton. At the start of 1973, the FCC ordered that WFAB, which had filed its license renewal application, join seven other United stations in comparative hearing for fraudulent billing practices. The FCC review board then expanded the scope of the hearing at the petition of United Broadcasting Company of Florida that the station's public service record be considered.

In May 1974, FCC administrative law judge Byron Harrison handed down his initial decision denying the license renewal application. Harrison held WFAB responsible for the record-keeping failures that allowed Miami appliance dealer Crown Trading Company to double- and triple-bill its suppliers for advertising reimbursements, using doctored WFAB letterhead, which continued even after a November 1970 management changeover. It was not the only high-profile incident that month: on May 16, a dispute between rival factions over station control, stemming from its coverage of the April funeral of exile leader José Elías de la Torriente, spiraled out of control and prompted the station manager to call police. Local politicians pressured the station to rehire Tomás García Fusté, the news director who was forced out.

In October 1975, the FCC upheld the judge's ruling, noting that the inexperienced local management had supplied blank WFAB letterhead to Crown in support of its misrepresentations and notarized incomplete documents. The FCC allowed WFAB to remain on the air to wind up its affairs until December 17, 1975. Earlier in the year, "La Fabulosa" had retooled its format in order to draw a younger audience, airing more music and consolidating its news into two daily bulletins at noon and 5 p.m.

United attempted an appeal; in the meantime, in January 1976, Eaton fired the entire 25-man air staff of WFAB and suspended normal programming. The Cuban employees claimed they were fired for insubordination; Eaton cited the need to improve falling ratings. Among the members of the new air staff was Fusté, who had been fired two years earlier. Regalado returned to La Fabulosa in October 1976 as its news director.

The FCC denied United's efforts for a reprieve in November 1976, stating that it could not bring up new issues that could have been discussed previously in the proceeding. A further blow to United came the next month, when the employees it had fired at the start of the year won a $60,000 settlement at the National Labor Relations Board.

WFAB was ordered by the commission to cease operations on the 22nd of the month; Congressman Claude Pepper introduced a bill to give United more time to respond to the FCC. The station ceased operating on February 21, 1977, at 12:01 a.m., after playing the Cuban and American national anthems. On February 20, its final day of broadcasting, some 6,000 people visited the station to sign a petition asking the FCC to reconsider; the station broadcast the opinions of listeners who called the closure an attack on the anti-Communist editorial stance of the station; and Latin-owned stores in Homestead closed their doors for an hour in protest. The license was canceled and call letters deleted on February 23.

The effects of the closure continued to ripple for some time after. In March, 10 leaders appeared before a House subcommittee on behalf of Pepper's bill, which was soon tabled. The next month, United Broadcasting Company sued its lawyers, the law firm of Smith and Pepper, for $50 million, alleging that the firm mishandled the WFAB renewal fight and failed to file a timely appeal.

=== Hearings for a successor ===
With WFAB deleted, the FCC received eight applications to build a new station at 990 kHz in Miami, from The New Continental Broadcasting Company, Central Broadcasting, Dadeland Broadcasting Company, Women's Florida Association of Broadcasters, Latin American Broadcasters, Community Broadcasters, Dade Communications and Radio America Broadcasting, which went into comparative hearing. In an initial decision in 1979, The New Continental—owned by Emilio Milián, a WQBA reporter who had lost his legs in a 1976 bomb attack—was given the nod; however, the FCC review board ruled in favor of Radio America the next year. In 1983, the FCC remanded the case after it was discovered that Radio America may have misrepresented its financial qualifications. As a result of a settlement, RAB's application was dismissed, leaving three remaining contenders for the frequency; citing its higher percentage of female and minority principals than The New Continental, the FCC selected the application of Community Broadcasters, Inc., owned by María Teresa Saldise, Carrie Meek and María Elena Prío de Durán. The new station was granted its construction permit in 1988 and signed on in 1997 as WFBA, now WMYM.
