= Antonio Michel and Marcos Maiquel Lima Cruz =

Antonio Michel Lima Cruz and Marcos Maiquel Lima Cruz are Cuban brothers and dissident journalists. They are members of the Cuban Council of Human Rights Rapporteurs. In 2009, their online newspaper Cardogna was shut down by the Cuban government.

In the evening of Christmas Day 2010, the brothers were hosting a party at which they played hip-hop music with lyrics criticizing the lack of free speech in Cuba. The party was raided by police, and both brothers were arrested. They were subsequently charged with "insulting symbols of their homeland". In May 2011, they were found guilty at what Amnesty International described as a "summary trial". Antonio Michel sentenced to two years' imprisonment, and Marcos Maiquel to three years' imprisonment. Amnesty International designated them to be prisoners of conscience, "detained solely for peacefully exercising their right to freedom of expression".
