= José Óscar Sánchez Madan =

Cuban journalist

José Óscar Sánchez Madan, born in Marianao on 10 December 1961 is a Cuban journalist and author in several Cuban newspapers, and a regular contributor of the Miami-based independent news agency CUBANET.

As spokesman Elizardo Sánchez Santa-Cruz of the Cuba human rights group CCDHRN said, Óscar Sánchez Madan was arrested on Friday April 13, 2007 and was convicted to four years of prison a few hours after his arrest by a secret court in an accelerated process in Union de Reyes, a village east of Havana. He got no defence lawyer and no relatives were allowed to attend the lawsuit. He was convicted under the charges of "pre-criminal social danger", a legal subterfuge that allows the Cuban authorities to imprison any citizen as a potential danger to society, even if they have not committed a crime. His arrest put the toll of imprisoned journalists up to 26 as of June 2007.
