= Ciro Díaz =

Musician

Ciro Díaz is composer, lead guitarist of the band Porno para Ricardo, and leader of the alternative rock band La Babosa Azul. Ciro earned a Bachelor in Mathematics from the University of Havana and learned to play the guitar on his own.
