= Pedro Luis Boitel =

Cuban writer and dissident (1931–1972)

Pedro Luis Boitel (May 13, 1931 – May 25, 1972) was a Cuban poet and dissident who opposed the governments of both Fulgencio Batista and Fidel Castro. In 1961, he was sentenced to 10 years in prison.

Boitel died during a hunger strike in prison in 1972 while serving a sentence handed down by the communist regime.

== Before the revolution ==
Pedro Luis Boitel was born into a humble family originally from Picardy (France), and studied at the University of Havana while also working as a radio technician. In the 1950s Boitel opposed the government of Fulgencio Batista and went into exile in Venezuela where he collaborated with Rómulo Betancourt in his efforts to overthrow Marcos Pérez Jiménez's military government by setting up a pirate radio station in that country.

After the Cuban Revolution, Boitel returned to Cuba and resumed his studies at the University of Havana. In 1959, Boitel ran for president of the University Students' Federation (Federación Estudiantil Universitaria; FEU) at the University of Havana and was backed by the 26th of July Movement. Even though Fidel Castro headed this movement, Castro and the other revolutionary leaders removed their support for Boitel. Castro personally intervened in the student elections at the University of Havana to remove Boitel from the FEU presidency.

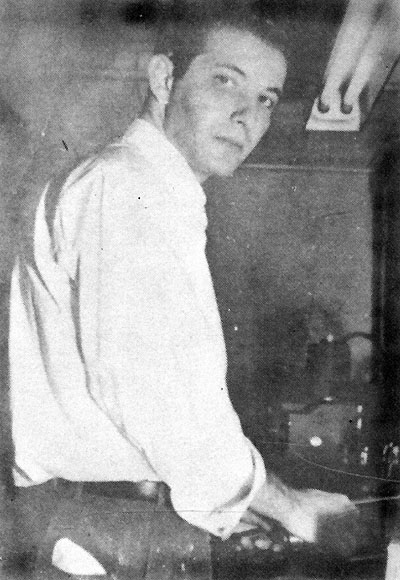

== Jail and hunger strike ==
In 1961 Boitel was sentenced to ten years in jail for conspiracy against the state. He was not released after the 10-year sentence. It is claimed that Boitel was tortured and beaten several times and that his mother Claretta was humiliated when she went to visit him in jail. The Inter-American Commission of Human Rights found that the Cuban government had violated Article I of the American Declaration on the Rights and Duties of Man in their treatment of the prisoner.

On April 3, 1972, Boitel declared himself on hunger strike. After 53 days on hunger strike without receiving medical assistance and receiving only liquids, he died of starvation on May 25, 1972. His last days were related by his close friend, poet Armando Valladares. He was buried in an unmarked grave in the Cólon Cemetery in Havana.

In 1973, the year after Boitel died, Claretta gave an interview about her son via a phone conversation with Tomás Regalado, a news editor for WFAB, a Spanish language radio station in Miami, Florida. The phone call lasted for 20-minutes and aired on the station the same year. The phone call was also notable because foreign telephone calls out of Cuba were closely monitored.

== See also ==
- Human rights in Cuba
- Opposition to Fidel Castro
