= Gorki Águila =

Cuban rock musician (born 1968)

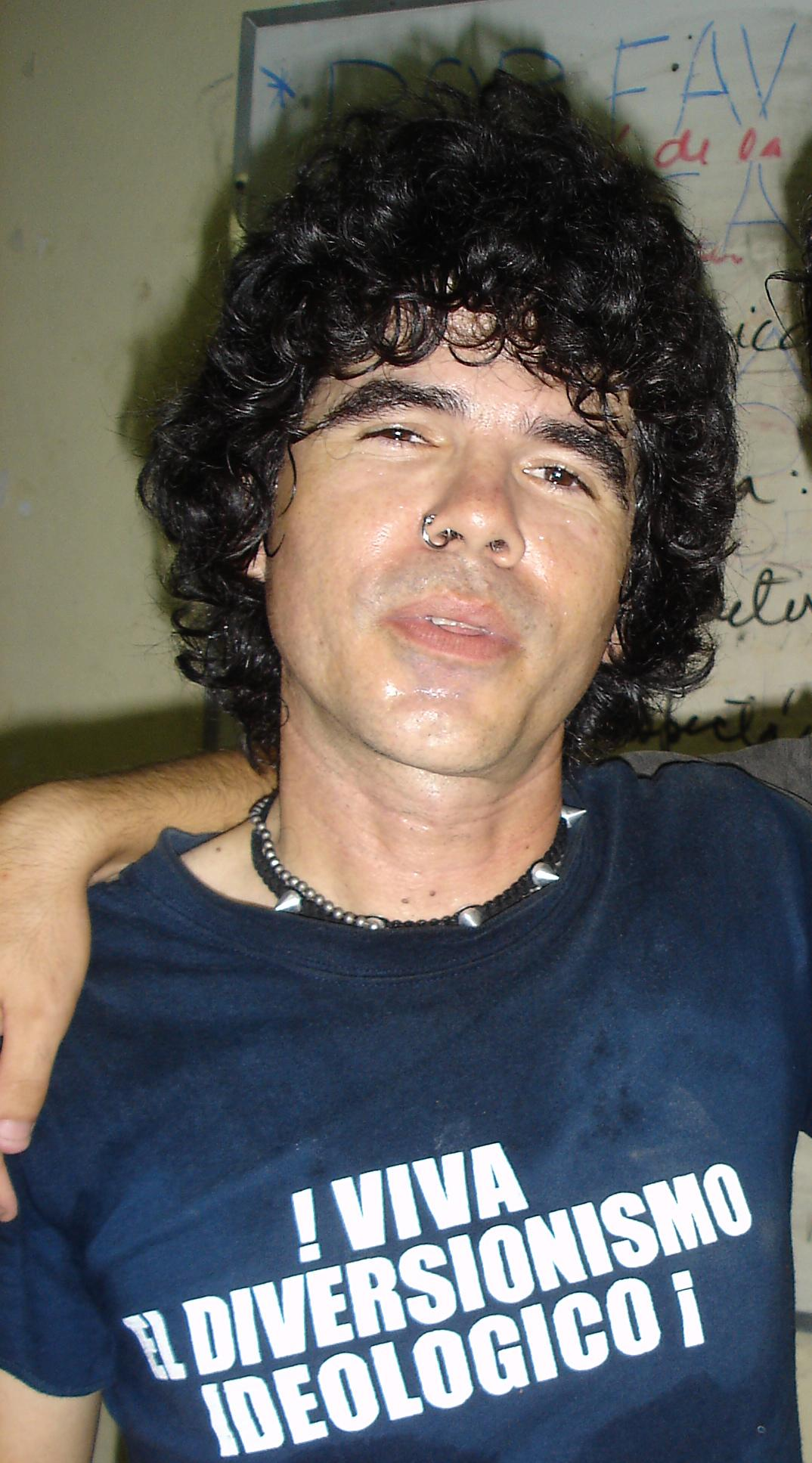
- Born: November 11, 1968 (age 57); Havana
- Occupation: Musician

Gorki Águila (born November 11, 1968) is a Cuban rock musician and leads the punk rock band Porno para Ricardo. He is known for his opposition to Communism and to Cuba's Castro administration.

Águila lives with his father in a small apartment in Marianao, where he also has been recording his songs with the band since they were forbidden to have concerts. His mother and sister live in Mexico. Águila has an 11-year-old daughter, Gabriela.

In August 2008, Águila was arrested by the Cuban police with the charge of "dangerousness", which allows them to detain people whom they think they are likely to commit crimes. The charge carries a penalty of one up to four years in prison. Signs of a "dangerousness state" are habitual drunkness and anti-social behaviour. He was eventually ordered to pay a $30 fine for the lesser offence of public disorder, after prosecutors dropped the more serious charge.

He has stated in an interview in 2008: "Capitalism is very problematic, as are Communism and socialism. . . . For me, defending my anti-Castro ideas doesn’t mean an implicit defense of capitalism."

== See also ==
- Censorship in Cuba
- Cuban dissident movement
