= Anyer Antonio Blanco =

Cuban dissident

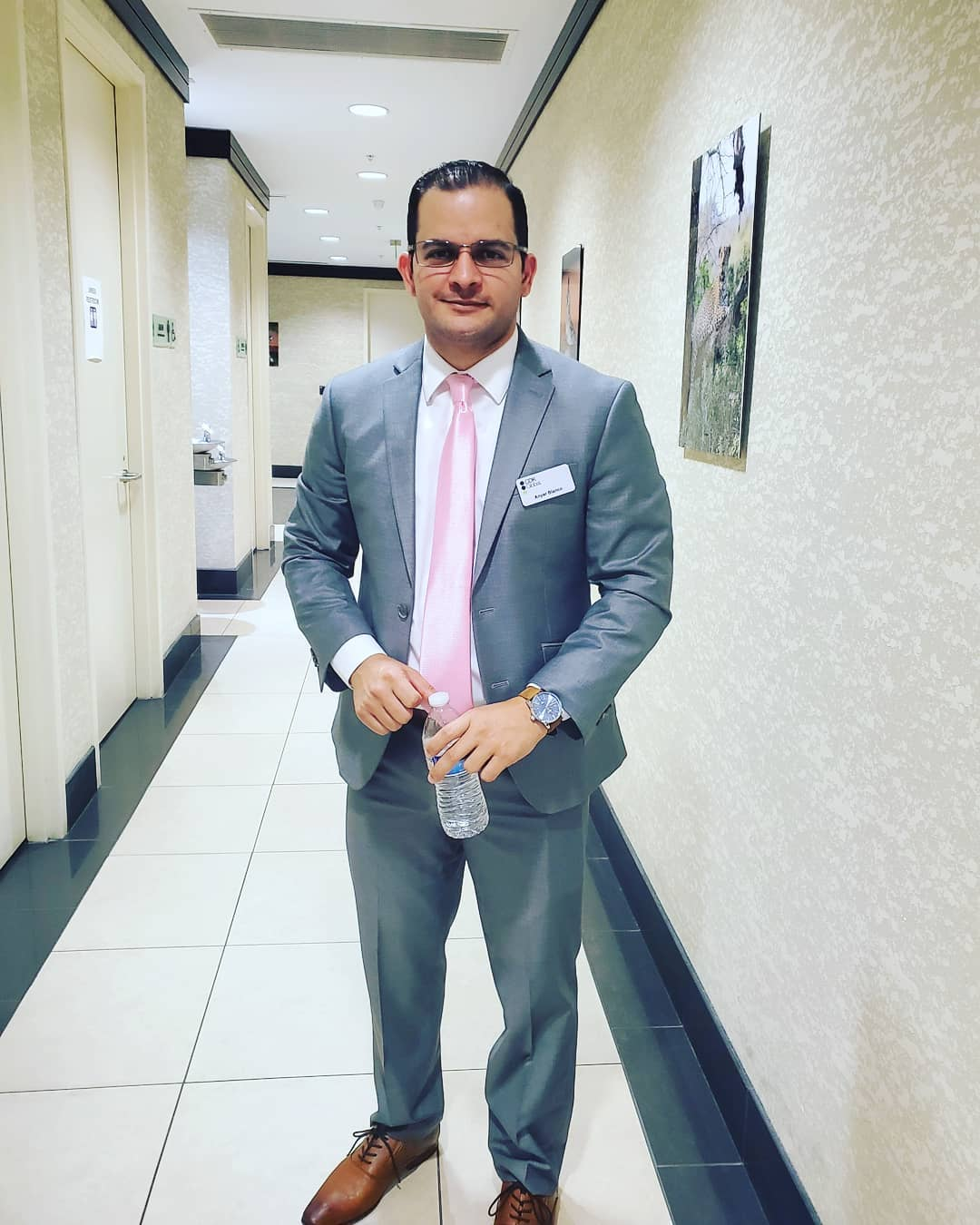

Anyer Antonio Blanco (born July 28, 1987) is a Cuban dissident, whose anti-regime activities are based in his hometown of Santiago. He served six years as a self-described political prisoner in Cuban jails until his release in 2012. Blanco is one of the few users of Twitter in Cuba. Havana-based fellow dissident Yoani Sánchez's Twitter account has been "certified" and who constantly tweets and uploads videos from within Cuba against the regime, activity which has been recognized outside Cuba.

== Biography ==
=== Early life and imprisonment ===
Born in 1987 in Santiago, he was sentenced to six years in jail after an illegal attempt to leave the country. While in prison, he survived two self-imposed hunger strikes. Dissident groups demonstrated near his prison while he was on hunger strike. Karen Caballero of Radio y Televisión Martí described him as one of the highest profile Cuban dissidents at this time. Pro-Cuban regime bloggers single him out and criticize his activities and he has been described by one as "the most promising young man in the internal counterrevolutionary movement" in Cuba. These bloggers follow and describe in detail Anyer Antonio Blanco's extensive travels throughout the world.

=== Post-imprisonment activity ===
In June 2013, Blanco, National Youth Coordinator for the Cuban Patriotic Union (UNPACU), met with former Polish president Lech Wałęsa in Warsaw and in October of that year was invited by the Václav Havel Institute to speak about democracy-building in Buenos Aires, Argentina. In October 2014, Blanco participated in the Rising Star Program sponsored by International Republican Institute held in Prague, Czech Republic. He also represented UNPACU at the World Movement for Democracy 8th Assembly held in Seoul, Korea in 2015, and represented UNPACU at the Organization of American States (OAS) meeting held in Santo Domingo, Dominican Republic in June, 2016. He has also traveled several times to the United States, including the nation's capital, the Miami, Florida area and San Juan, Puerto Rico, where he now spends several months of the year studying as a senior at Sacred Heart University, when not residing in Santiago de Cuba. During his travels, he has met with several prominent figures, including Walesa, U.S. representatives Ileana Ros-Lehtinen, Mario Díaz-Balart, Pedro Pierluisi and Joe García, Obama administration official Ben Rhodes, former representative Lincoln Díaz-Balart, former Puerto Rico Secretaries of State David Bernier and Kenneth McClintock.

During the civil unrest in several Venezuelan cities in February 2014, pro-Castro bloggers identified Yoani Sánchez, former Colombian president Alvaro Uribe, UNPACU leader Jose Daniel Ferrer and Anyer Blanco as being allies of Venezuelan dissidents. Mr. Blanco adopted a moderate response to the first steps to reestablish diplomatic relations with Cuba announced by U.S. President Barack Obama on December 17, 2014, in keeping with UNPACU's policy.

== Sources ==
http://blogsdecuba.impela.net/2013/10/entrevista-a-anyer-antonio-blanco-miembro-de-unpacu-despues-de-haber-regresado-de-una-gira-por-algunos-paises-libres-y-democraticos/
