= Guillermo Fariñas =

Cuban dissident (born 1962)

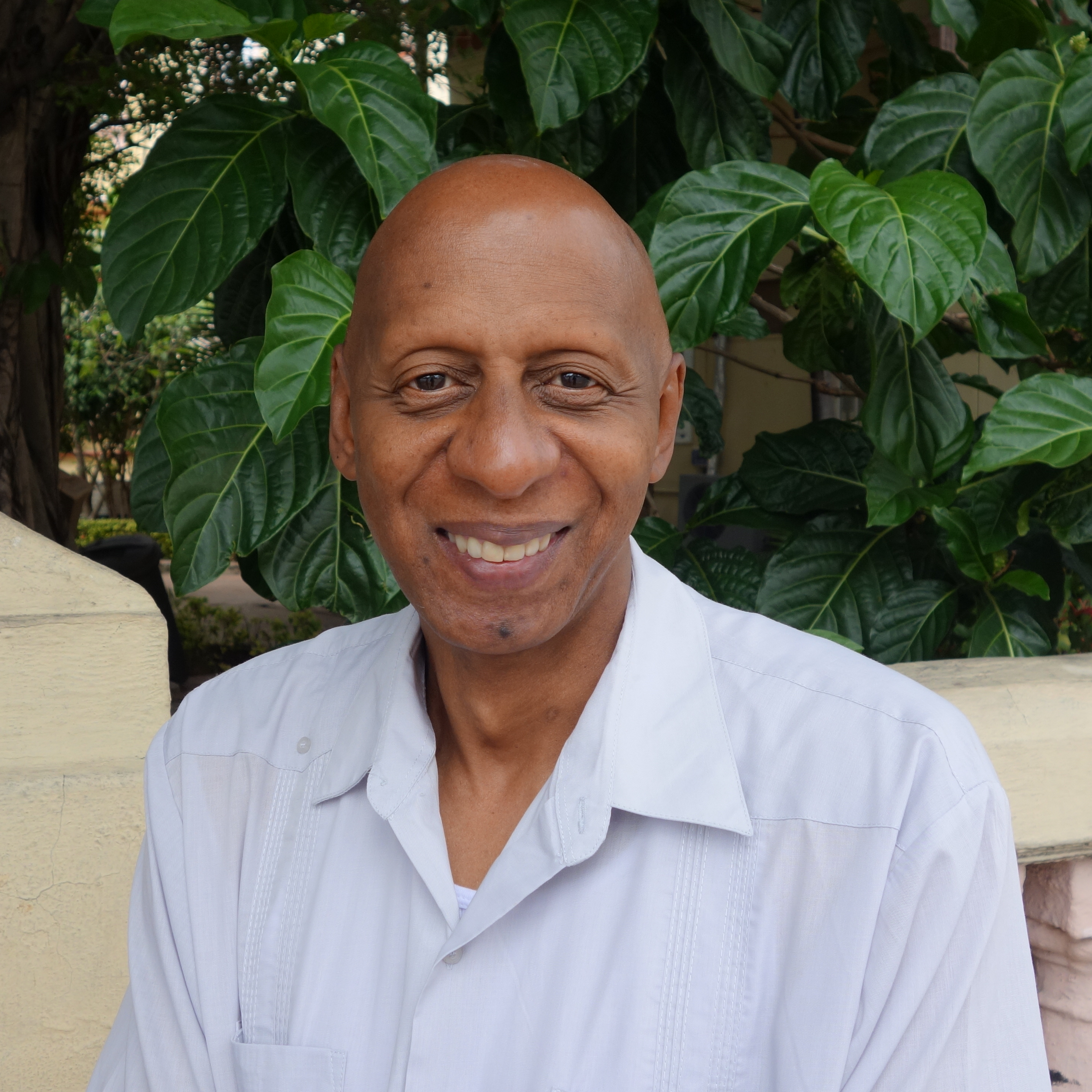
- Born: 3 January 1962 (age 64); Santa Clara, Cuba
- Occupation: journalist
- Known for: hunger strike, dissident journalism
- Awards: Sakharov Prize (2010)

Guillermo Fariñas Hernández (born 3 January 1962) ("El Coco") is a Cuban doctor of psychology, independent journalist and political dissident in Cuba. He has conducted 23 hunger strikes over the years to protest various elements of the Cuban government and spent more than 11 years in prison. He vowed that he would die in the struggle against censorship in Cuba.

== Early life ==
Fariñas was born in Santa Clara. Fariñas's father, Guillermo Fariñas Key, had been part of the Cuban military forces, and fought in the Congo under Che Guevara in the 1960s. After completing ninth grade, he too began to study in the Camilo Cienfuegos military school, after which he went to Havana as a precadet in the Cuban Revolutionary Armed Forces, where he studied intelligence and counterintelligence with the special forces. Fariñas formed part of the unit sent to guard the Peruvian embassy during the Mariel Boatlift.

Fariñas underwent special forces training with Chinese, Korean, and Vietnamese trainers. In 1980, he was deployed to Angola, where he fought under Colonel Antonio Enrique Luzon. As a special forces soldier in the Commandos for Demolition, Penetration, and Sabotage, he participated in eleven missions into the UNITA rearguard, for which he received military decorations. He received two bullet wounds. In 1981, Fariñas went to the U.S.S.R. to Tambov where he studied at the Airborne Academy but, due to official negligence, suffered exposure to a chemical nerve agent that damaged his health to the point that he had to be discharged from the army.

In 1983, he began studying in the Department of Psychology in the Universidad Central de las Villas. In 1986 he was nearly expelled for being part of a Freudian group which was considered sympathetic to Perestroika and Glasnost. He graduated in 1988. Unable to become a psychology professor because he was considered politically unreliable, Fariñas began working as a clinical psychologist in Camajuaní. He was the Secretary General of the Young Communist League. When he opposed the execution of Arnaldo Ochoa Sánchez, he was expelled from his clinic and lost his membership in the Communist Youth League.

He was transferred to the José Martí Pediatric Hospital in Sancti Spíritus, where he established the mental health ward and adolescent clinic. Nevertheless, he was denied housing for not being politically reliable.

In 1993, he called on Fidel Castro in front of the foreign press to fulfill his promise to reopen the Pedro Borrás Pediatric Hospital in Havana. He was elected General Secretary of Healthcare Workers' Union.

In 1995, Fariñas was sent to the Valle Grande jail in Havana for 20 months. According to Fariñas, this was because he had denounced the corruption of the director of the hospital where he worked, a Central Committee member, to the National Revolutionary Police Force, and as a result was accused of various false crimes, including illegal possession of arms. State media, on the other hand, claim that he went to jail after physically attacking a woman, an official from the health institution where he worked as a psychologist. In 1997, he was condemned to a further 18 months of confinement, during which he undertook a strike on eating solid food. In 2002, he was attacked by a State Security agent and condemned to seven years of confinement, but after undertaking a fourteen-month hunger strike he was released.

In a 2007 interview with Harper's magazine ("The Battle of Ideas"), Fariñas described State Security officers detaining him in Santa Clara, forcibly committing him to a psychiatric hospital ward overnight, and supervising his injection with unknown drugs.

== 2006 hunger strike ==
In 2006, Fariñas held a seven-month hunger strike to protest against the Internet censorship in Cuba, in particular the closure of the Ciber Cafe in Santa Clara by State Security forces. He ended it in Autumn 2006, due to severe health problems. His acts received worldwide attention and Reporters Without Borders awarded its cyber-freedom prize to Guillermo Fariñas in 2006. He also received the International Human Rights Award at Weimar.

== 2010 hunger strike ==
On February 26, 2010, Fariñas declared yet another hunger strike to protest the death of fellow dissident Orlando Zapata Tamayo. He has indicated that he will remain on strike until twenty-six other prisoners of conscience who are seriously ill are set free. In July, he ended the protest after Raul Castro, the Cuban president, approved the release of 52 prisoners of conscience.

=== Cuban government response ===
"Cuba will not accept pressure or blackmail, important Western media groups are again calling attention to a prefabricated lie. It is not medicine that should resolve a problem that was created intentionally to discredit our political system -- but rather the patient himself, unpatriotic people, foreign diplomats and the media that manipulates him. The consequences will be their responsibility, and theirs alone."

— Granma, March 8, 2010

The Cuban state newspaper Granma stated that Fariñas's legal troubles began "because of a physical altercation with a female co-worker - not politics" and described him as "a paid agent of the United States" and employee of the U.S. Interests Section.

On July 8, 2010, Fariñas ended his 134-day hunger strike Thursday, following signs the communist government is making good on its promise to release 52 political prisoners.

== 2010 Sakharov Prize ==
On 20 October 2010, Fariñas was awarded the Sakharov Prize for Freedom of Thought by the European Parliament. In presenting the award the parliament commended Fariñas saying that he was a "symbol of the fight for freedom of speech". This marks the third time that the award has been made to Cuban dissidents.

In December 2010, the Cuban government denied Fariñas an exit visa necessary to travel to Strasbourg to accept the award. In response the European Parliament said that it would have an empty chair to represent him at the ceremony. Fariñas said, "I believe that the Cuban government has shown over the years that it is behaving in an arrogant manner."

In 2013, the travel ban was lifted and Fariñas finally received his Prize.

== 2011 hunger strike ==
On 3 June 2011, Fariñas declared his hunger strike to protest the Cuban authorities' response to fellow dissident Juan Wilfredo Soto García's death. Fariñas called for those responsible for the reported police beating three days before Soto died in a Santa Clara hospital to be brought to justice. He also demanded for the Cuban government to stop using violent means in its approach to non-violent opposition.

== 2012 detention ==
On 24 July 2012, he was one of dozens of activists arrested in Havana at the funeral of dissident Oswaldo Payá. Amnesty International and the U.S. criticized the arrests, with the White House describing them as "a stark demonstration of the climate of repression in Cuba." The dissidents were freed the following day.

== 2016 hunger strike ==
In 2016, Fariñas and other members of the opposition organization Patriotic Union of Cuba (UNPACU) protested against the increasingly violent repression of dissidents and activists.

== Personal life ==
Fariñas has a wife, Clara, and a daughter.
