= Antonio Rodiles =

Cuban political activist

Antonio Enrique González-Rodiles Fernández
- Born: July 21, 1972 (age 54); Havana, Cuba
- Occupations: Physicist, Mathematician & political activist
- Website: Estado de SATS website

Antonio Enrique González-Rodiles Fernández (Antonio Rodiles, born July 21, 1972) is a Cuban political activist who has achieved international visibility for his work as the coordinator of Estado de SATS, a forum which was created in July 2010 to encourage debate on social, cultural and political issues in Cuba. Rodiles is also coordinator of the Forum for the Rights and Freedom.

== Education ==
Rodiles studied Physics in the University of Havana, Cuba. He received a PhD candidacy in Physics from the Institute of Nuclear Sciences of the National Autonomous University of Mexico (UNAM) in 2003. In 2003 he emigrated to America and settled in Tallahassee, Florida. He earned a master's degree in Mathematics in 2007 from Florida State University (FSU), and also worked as a professor at FSU and Tallahassee Community College before returning to Cuba.

== Activism ==
In 2010 he founded the forum "Estado de Sats" in Havana, Cuba, with the aim of creating “a plural space for participation and debate” between different sections of the Cuban society. Videos of the debates have widely circulated via YouTube, and have also been seen inside Cuba, where people pass them to others using USB memory sticks and DVD's (Internet access is severely restricted in Cuba).

In June 2012, the "Citizen Demand for Another Cuba" campaign, coordinated by Rodiles, demanding the regime to ratify the International Covenant on Civil and Political Rights and the International Covenant on Economic, Social and Cultural Rights.

=== Arrest ===
In November 2012, shortly after the arrest of an independent lawyer and journalist, Antonio Rodiles and several other government critics went to the Cuban State Security headquarters, known as Section 21 (Sección 21) in the neighbourhood of Marianao in Havana, to enquire after her whereabouts. Before they could reach the building they were approached by 20 people, all plain-clothed, as two officials from the Ministry of the Interior looked on. Antonio Rodiles was reportedly knocked to the ground and pinned down by several men. Several of the other activists were also manhandled and were forced into a police vehicle and sent to various police stations around Havana. All were released by 11 November, but Antonio Rodiles remained in prison. Amnesty International issued an Urgent Action call for his release. He was finally released after 19 days in a prison cell.

=== Further work ===
Rodiles sent an open letter to Cuban president Raúl Castro, dated Dec 6th 2013, to protest against the multiple threats and pressure he has received because of this dissent activities.

In December 2013, Rodiles and Estado de SATS hosted a meeting about human rights ("Encuentro Internacional de Derechos Humanos y Pactos de la ONU") at his house in Havana, with the participation of dissidents and artists from Cuba and other countries. The Cuban state security police surrounded his house and detained several people who wanted to join the meeting. Rodiles was also detained, but freed hours later.

Rodiles is a signer of the Madrid Charter, joining an alliance of right-wing and far-right individuals organized by Spanish political party Vox.
