= Elizardo Sánchez =

Cuban activist and philosophy professor

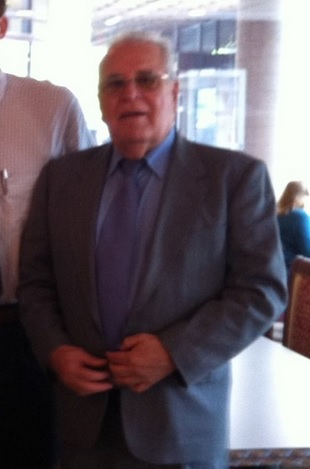
- Born: Elizardo Sánchez Santa Cruz-Pacheco; 29 June 1944 (age 82); Santiago de Cuba, Cuba
- Occupations: President of the Cuban Commission for National Reconciliation and Human Rights. Former university professor. Political dissenter and activist.
- Known for: Dissident, activist, prisoner of conscience since 1980
- Website: http://www.unpacu.org/

Elizardo Sánchez Santa Cruz-Pacheco (Santiago de Cuba, 29 June 1944) is a former philosophy professor at the University of Havana, president of the Cuban Commission for National Reconciliation and Human Rights (CCDHRN), a human rights organisation founded in 1987 whose work has been recognized internationally by receiving the Human Rights Watch prize in 1991 and the Human Rights Prize of the French Republic in 1996.

A member of the coordination council of the Cuban Patriotic Union, which has been described by the United States State Department as the "largest group of Cuban opposition", the organization pursues a peaceful opposition to the repression of civil liberties in Cuba.

As a notable dissident and human rights activist in Cuba, he has been declared numerous times to be a prisoner of conscience since 1989. He has become over thirty years a worldwide reference for human rights organizations and international press about the state of human rights in the island nation and the situation of prisoners of conscience.

== Biography ==
=== Prisoner of Conscience ===
According to a 1989 International Amnesty report, Elizardo Sánches was detained in April 1980 and sentenced to six years in prison, charged with spreading "enemy propaganda". He was set free on 29 December 1985 but was arrested again, along with two other members of CCDHRN, in September 1986 and imprisoned without formal charges or trial until he was released in May 1987.
