= Social dangerousness =

Category of anti-social behaviour

Social dangerousness is a category of anti-social behaviour on the basis of detectors of dangerousness that enable the judicial authorities to justify the need for a particular control by the police authorities.

These measures differ from country to country: in Italy they are called preventive measures, which are derived from a comprehensive analysis that involves both the tendency to commit crimes and the sphere of the moral conduct of an individual. In United Kingdom, they were foreseen by Anti-social Behaviour Act 2003 as injunctions; in United States many States apply civil confinement to some antisocial behaviour.

On the opposite side, some governments links this analysis directly to prison terms, not complying to nulla poena sine lege principle.

== Extent and length ==
The rule of law requires the social dangerousness to be assessed “on the basis of factual elements” Also in Addington v. Texas, the Supreme Court "held without dissent that in a civil commitment hearing the due process clause of the Fourteenth Amendment requires a standard of proof on the issues of the patient's mental illness and of his danger to himself or to others equal to or greater than "clear and convincing" evidence".

The judgment no. 2 of 1956 of the Constitutional Court of Italy "set out a number of fundamental principles: (a) preventive measures limiting personal freedom are allowed within the limits imposed by article 13 of the Constitution; (b) preventive measures restrictive of freedom of movement can be applied by the administrative authority for reasons of public security in the cases prescribed by law, subject to subsequent judicial review; (c) such measures, properly motivated, must be based on facts (and not suspicions) and must be issued in the respect of the judicial guarantees".

Punishment "should not be imposed, nor the term of punishment extended, by virtue of a prediction of dangerousness, beyond that which would be justified as a deserved punishment independently of that prediction".

In the Elizabethan period, in England "came the Vagrancy Acts, providing sanctions against sturdy rogues and vagabonds, those wandering abroad without lawful or visible means of support, those loitering with intent, and those falling within similar arcane phraseology which still underpins the disorderly conduct statutes, regulations, and ordinances of many states, cities, and counties in the United States. These sanctions are plainly preemptive strikes against those seen as likely to be disturbing, disruptive, or dangerous. Included in this group would be "suspicious persons" ordinances, "stop and frisk," and public drunkenness laws".

== In Cuba ==
As Pre-criminal danger to society is a legal charge under Cuban law which allows the authorities to detain people who they think are likely to commit crimes. The charge carries a penalty of up to four years in prison. The Cuban government has been accused by Amnesty International of using the charge almost exclusively against critics of the government.

People that have been imprisoned under this charge include:

- Raymundo Perdigon Brito sentenced to four years in prison on 5 December 2006.
- José Oscar Sánchez Madan, sentenced to four years in prison
- Guillermo Espinosa Rodríguez, sentenced to two years of house arrest

In 2008, the punk rock singer and dissident Gorki Águila was arrested by police on a charge of social dangerousness. He was eventually ordered to pay a $30 fine for the lesser offence of public disorder, after prosecutors dropped the charge of social dangerousness.

In 2007, political protester Ramón Velásquez was arrested for the charge of social dangerousness. Velásquez was participating in a march across Cuba that highlighted what it viewed as human rights violations and freedom for "political prisoners". Velásquez was then tried in a closed hearing and sentenced to three years in prison. Velásquez was released in January 2010.

Cuban law defines dangerousness (el estado peligroso) as "the special proclivity of a person to commit crimes, demonstrated by conduct that is observed to be in manifest contradiction with the norms of socialist morality." ... If Cuba determines that someone is dangerous, the Criminal Code allows the state to impose "pre-criminal measures," including surveillance by the National Revolutionary Police and re-education for periods of one-to-four years. The state may detain the person during this time. The law also provides for "therapeutic measures," including detention in a psychiatric hospital, that are continued "until the dangerousness disappears from the subject." The open-ended nature of this punishment affords the state extraordinary authority to abuse the rights of political opponents and the developmentally disabled.

— Human Rights Watch 1999 report

== Bibliography ==
- John Barker Waite, The Prevention of Repeated Crime (1943)
- DeLisi, Matt; Munoz, Ed A. Future Dangerousness Revisited, Criminal Justice Policy Review, Vol. 14, Issue 3 (September 2003), pp. 287–305
- Slobogin Christopher, A Jurisprudence of Dangerousness, Northwestern University Law Review, Vol. 98, Issue 1 (2003), pp. 1–62
- Floud Jean, Dangerousness and Criminal Justice, British Journal of Criminology, Vol. 22, Issue 3 (July 1982), pp. 213–228

== See also ==
- Human rights in Cuba
- Censorship in Cuba
- Black Spring (Cuba)
- Civil commitment
