= Freedom Collection =

Digital human rights history repository

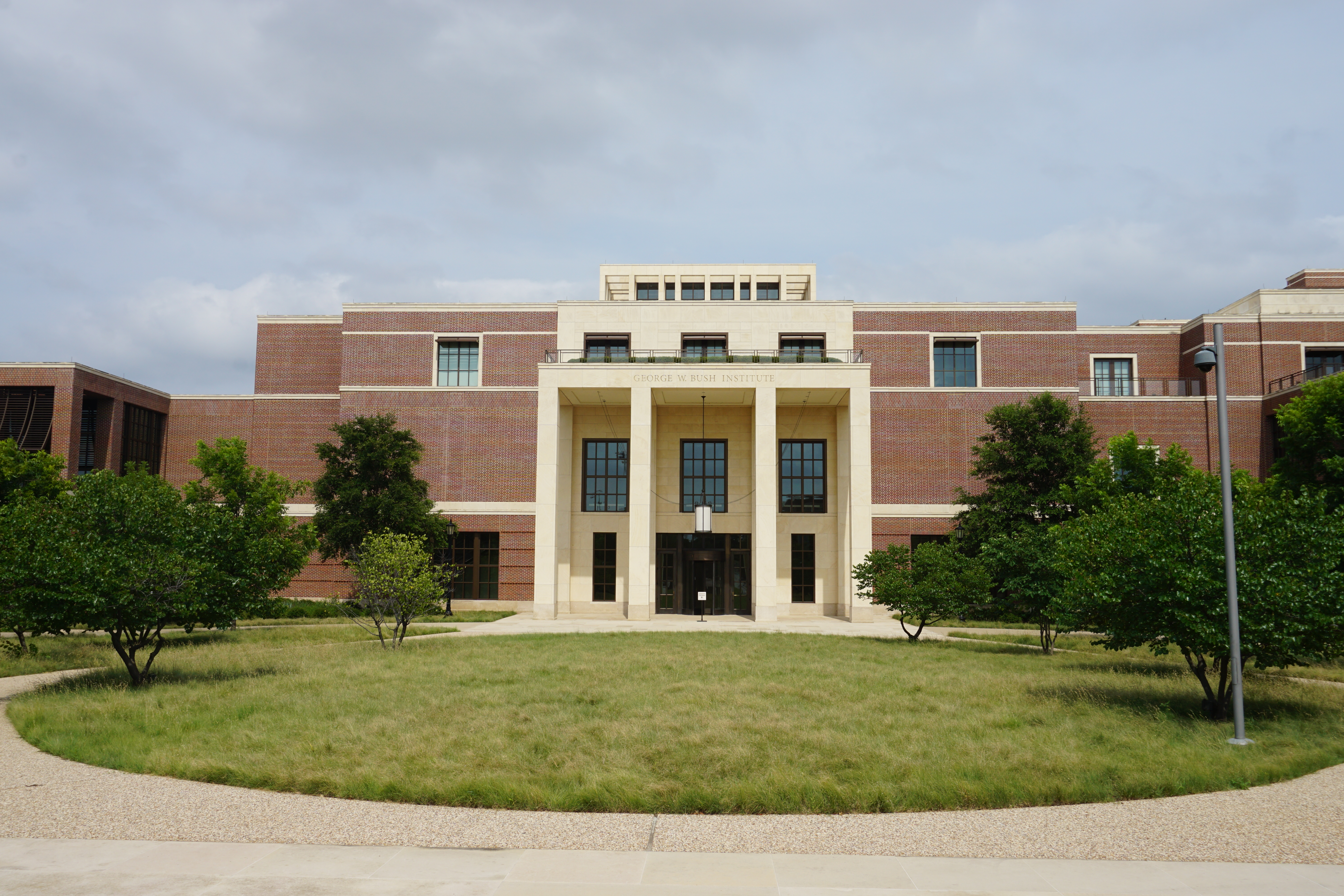
- The Bush Presidential Center, where the collection is kept, in July 2016
- Housed at: George W. Bush Presidential Center
- Curators: George W. Bush Institute
- Website: FreedomCollection.org

Freedom Collection is a digital repository sponsored by the George W. Bush Institute at the George W. Bush Presidential Center on Southern Methodist University's campus in Dallas, Texas. The collection documents major players in human rights and freedom movements around the world during the 20th and 21st centuries through video interviews and documents. Contributors include former president of Liberia Ellen Johnson Sirleaf, Syrian dissident and author Ammar Abdulhamid, former president of Czechoslovakia and the Czech Republic Václav Havel, Chinese civil rights activist Chen Guangcheng, former president of Peru Alejandro Toledo, and Egyptian author Saad Eddin Ibrahim. At its launch on March 28, 2012, the collection consisted of 56 interviews. As of 2022, the Freedom Collection website was last updated in 2016 and its YouTube channel, where video interviews are available to watch, was last updated in October 2015. It is unclear if the project is still active.

== Physical collection ==
The Freedom Collection is housed at the Bush Presidential Center in Dallas and displays several important documents and items from human rights movements. The first gift was an early draft of the 1963 Tibetan Constitution from the Dalai Lama and features handwritten notes in the margins. In 2018, Bob Fu donated a bible handwritten by "members of house churches in China while they were prisoners in Chinese labor camps." The Lawton Foundation donated the Presidential Medal of Freedom awarded to Cuban activist Óscar Elías Biscet in 2007 to display until Biscet was released from political prison in Cuba. Biscet collected the medal in 2016. In 2014, the Collection produced the short documentary Freedom Denied: Cuba's Black Spring Continues. The following year, the archive was used to supplement high school curricula focused on "global struggles for liberty" written by the Bush Presidential Center.

== Interviews ==
As of 2022, the online collection has 95 video interviews, which can be organized by region:

=== The Americas ===
- Bertha Antunez, Cuba - women's rights activist
- Genaro Arriagada, Chile - former Minister Secretary General
- Roberto de Miranda, Cuba - professor
- Rodrigo Diamanti, Venezuela - human rights activist
- Alejandrina García de la Riva, Cuba - co-founder of Damas de Blanco, wife of dissident Diosdado González Marrero
- José Luis García Paneque, Cuba - journalist
- Jorge Luis "Antúnez" García Pérez, Cuba - human rights and democracy activist
- Marcel Granier, Venezuela - businessman
- Normando Hernández González, Cuba - journalist
- Ernesto Hernández Busto, Cuba - writer
- Regis Iglesias Ramirez, Cuba - political and civil society activist
- Ricardo Lagos, Chile - lawyer, former president of Chile
- Ana Lazara Rodriguez, Cuba - doctor, anti-Castro political activist
- Carlos Alberto Montaner, Cuba - journalist, Castro critic
- Cristal Montañez, Venezuela - human freedom and democracy activist, former Miss Venezuela
- Pablo Pacheco Ávila, Cuba - journalist
- Arturo Pérez de Alejo Rodríguez, Cuba - human rights activist
- Horacio Julio Piña Borrego, Cuba - human rights activist
- Blas Giraldo Reyes Rodríguez, Cuba - librarian, Varela Project member
- Claudio Jose Sandoval, Venezuela - human rights activist
- Ariel Sigler Amaya, Cuba - former boxer, teacher
- Berta Soler, Cuba - Damas de Blanco leader
- Fidel Suárez Cruz, Cuba - Party for Human Rights in Cuba member, librarian
- Alejandro Toledo, Peru - former President of Peru, opposition leader
- Armando Valladares, Cuba - poet, diplomat
- Álvaro Varela Walker, Chile - attorney, human rights activist
- Manuel Vázquez Portal, Cuba - poet, journalist

=== Greater Middle East ===
- Ammar Abdulhamid, Syria - author, human rights activist
- Mahmoud Afifi, Egypt - democracy activist
- Namees Arnous, Egypt - reporter, civil society activist
- Abdel Aziz BelKhodja, Tunisia - writer, democracy advocate
- Abdelbasset Ben Hassen, Tunisia - Arab Organization for Human Rights president, Arab human rights activist
- Sarah Ben Behia, Tunisia - freedom activist
- Sihem Bensedrine, Tunisia - journalist, human rights activist
- Samar El Husseiny, Egypt - human rights activist
- Bahey Hassan, Egypt - human rights activist
- Saad Eddin Ibrahim, Egypt - sociologist, human rights and democracy activist
- Zied Mhirsi, Tunisia - global health professional, health advocate
- Nima Rashedan, Iran - political analyst, cybersecurity expert
- Mahmoud Salem, Egypt - author
- Sally Sami, Egypt - Front to Defend Egypt's Protesters leader, human rights activist
- Ahmed Samih, Egypt - human rights activist, media adviser
- Mohsen Sazegara, Iran - journalist, pro-democracy political activist
- Nora Younis, Egypt - journalist, human rights activist
- Radwan Ziadeh, Syria - author, pro-democracy activist

=== Sub-Saharan Africa ===
- Tutu Alicante, Equatorial Guinea - human rights lawyer
- Birtukan Mideksa, Ethiopia - National Election Board of Ethiopia chairwoman, former judge
- Max du Preez, South Africa - writer, documentarian
- Frene Ginwala, South Africa - journalist, former Speaker of the National Assembly of South Africa
- Jestina Mukoko, Zimbabwe - human rights activist, Zimbabwe Peace Project director
- Mamphela Ramphele, South Africa - politician, anti-apartheid activist
- Albie Sachs, South Africa - lawyer, first judge appointed to the Constitutional Court of South Africa
- Ellen Johnson Sirleaf, Liberia - former President of Liberia

=== Asia ===
- Charm Tong, Burma - Shan Women's Action Network co-founder, human rights activist
- Cheery Zahau, Burma - human rights activist, writer
- Ahn Myeong Chul, North Korea - former prison guard turned defector, human rights activist
- Cynthia Maung, Burma - Mae Tao Clinic founder, doctor
- Alberto Ricardo da Silva, East Timor - Roman Catholic bishop
- Dalai Lama, China - Tibetan spiritual leader
- Fernando "Lasama" de Araújo, East Timor - activist, politician
- Đoàn Viết Hoạt, Vietnam - journalist, democratic activist
- Fang Zheng, China - Tiananmen Square protester, human rights activist
- Bob Fu, China - pastor
- Chen Guangcheng, China - civil rights activist, barefoot lawyer
- Han Nam-su, North Korea - human rights activist
- Ashin "King Zero" Issariya, Burma - Buddhist monk
- Ji Seong-ho, North Korea - freedom activist
- Kang Chol-hwan, North Korea - author, founder of North Korea Strategy Center
- Khin Lay, Burma - women's rights and democracy advocate
- Kim Kwang-jin, North Korea - banker, freedom and human rights activist
- Kim Seong-min, North Korea - democracy activist, Free North Korea Radio founder
- Kim Seung-chul, North Korea - freedom of information activist, North Korea Reform Radio founder
- Min Yan Naing, Burma - Generation Wave youth movement founder, democracy activist
- Khin Ohmar, Burma - democracy activist, 8888 Uprising leader
- Park Sang-hak, North Korea - democracy activist, Fighters for a Free North Korea chairman
- Constâncio Pinto, East Timor - diplomat, resistance leader
- José Ramos-Horta, East Timor - President of East Timor
- Rebiya Kadeer, China - businesswoman, political activist
- Shin Dong-hyuk, North Korea - human rights activist
- Wai Wai Nu, Burma - Burmese equality and rights activist
- Wei Jingsheng, China - human rights and pro-democracy activist, The Fifth Modernization writer
- Zin Mar Aung, Burma - politician, former MP

=== Europe ===
- Czeslaw Bielecki, Poland - architect, anti-communism activist
- Bogdan Borusewicz, Poland - Deputy Marshal of the Polish Senate, democratic opposition activist
- Martin Bútora, Slovakia - sociologist, diplomat
- Andrzej Celiński, Poland - politician, democratic opposition activist
- Andrzej Gwiazda and Joanna Duda-Gwiazda, Poland - he is an engineer and opposition leader; both anti-communist activists
- Václav Havel, Czech Republic - writer, last president of Czechoslovakia/first of the Czech Republic
- Vytautas Landsbergis, Lithuania - politician, first Seimas speaker after Lithuania's split from the USSR
- Zbigniew and Zofia Romaszewski, Poland - politician, human rights activist and his wife
- Karel Schwarzenberg, Czech Republic - former Minister of Foreign Affairs, former MP
- Alexandr Vondra, Czech Republic - diplomat, former Defence Minister
- Lech Wałęsa, Poland - Nobel Peace Prize laureate, former President of Poland (first to be elected by popular vote)
- Bronisław Wildstein, Poland - journalist, Wildstein list creator
- Viktor Yushchenko, Ukraine - former President of Ukraine, opposition leader
