= Antonio Díaz =

Antonio Díaz may refer to:

== Arts and entertainment ==
- Antonio Díaz Villamil (1897–1948), Bolivian novelist
- Antonio Díaz Conde (1914–1976), Mexican composer
- Antonio Díaz (illusionist) (born 1986), Spanish illusionist

== Law and politics ==
- Antonio F. Díaz (1789–1869), Uruguayan general and politician
- Antonio Díaz Soto y Gama (1880–1967), Mexican politician and revolutionary
- Antonio Diaz (Filipino politician) (1927–2011)
- Antonio de Jesús Díaz (born 1958), Mexican politician

== Sports ==
=== Association football (soccer) ===
- Antonio Díaz Gil (1934–2014), Spanish footballer
- Antonio Díaz (footballer, born 1969) (1969–2013), Spanish footballer
- Antonio Fernando (Antonio Fernando Díaz, born 1970), Spanish footballer
- Antonio Díaz (Chilean footballer) (born 2000), Chilean footballer

=== Other sports ===
- Antonio Díaz-Miguel (1933–2000), Spanish basketball coach
- Antonio Miguel Díaz (born 1968), Spanish cyclist
- Antonio Díaz (boxer) (born 1976), Mexican boxer
- Antonio Díaz (karateka) (born 1980), Venezuelan karateka

== Others ==
- Antonio Díaz de Cardoso (16th century) (1495–1573), Portuguese conquistador
- Antonio Díaz (bishop) (fl. 1620s), Italian Roman Catholic prelate
- Antonio Díaz Martínez (1933–1986), Peruvian agronomist and revolutionary
- Antonio Díaz Sánchez (born 1962), Cuban dissident

== Other uses ==
- Antonio Díaz Municipality, Delta Amacuro, Venezuelan municipality
- Antonio Díaz Municipality, Nueva Esparta, Venezuelan municipality

== See also ==
- Antonio Dias (disambiguation)
