= Arnaldo Ramos Lauzerique =

- Died: 2016; Havana

Academic work
- Discipline: Independent economics
- Institutions: Instituto de Economía

Arnaldo Ramos Lauzerique was a Cuban independent economist. Ramos Lauzerique and Marta Beatriz Roque founded the Instituto de Economía.

== Information ==
The group of economists has exposed how the communist government uses false statistics when reporting to the people and to international organizations.

He was imprisoned during the Black Spring in 2003 and Amnesty International recognized him as a prisoner of conscience.

In August 2005 political prisoners Adolfo Fernández Sainz and Alfredo Domínguez Batista went on a hunger strike after Ramos was beaten by guards.

Ramos was freed in November 2010.
