= Luis Fernández (disambiguation) =

Luis Fernandez (born 1959) is a French former footballer and now coach.

Luis Fernández or Luis Fernandes may also refer to:

== Luis Fernández ==
- Luis Fernández (painter) (1594–1654), Spanish historical painter
- Luis Fernández de la Vega (1601–1675), Spanish sculptor and carver
- Luis Fernández de Córdoba y Arce, Spanish sailor and Governor of Chile, 1625–1629
- Luis Manuel Fernández de Portocarrero (1635–1709), Spanish cardinal archbishop of Toledo
- Luis Fernández de Córdova (1798–1840), Spanish military general, diplomat and first Marquis of Mendigorria
- Luis Ceballos y Fernández de Córdoba (1896–1967), Spanish forest engineer and botanist
- Luis Fernández López (1900–1973), Spanish painter
- Luis Colosio Fernández (1923–2010), Mexican IRP politician
- Luis Enrique Fernández (born 1951), Mexican footballer
- Luis Fernández (Costa Rican footballer) (born 1960), Costa Rican footballer
- Luis Fernandez de la Reguera (1966–2006), American independent film director
- Luis Milán Fernández (born 1970), Cuban physician
- Luis Fernández (footballer, born 1972), Spanish retired footballer
- Luis Fernández (actor) (born 1973), Venezuelan actor, writer, producer and director
- Luis Fernández (cyclist) (born 1980), Spanish cyclist
- Luis Fernández (footballer, born 1989), Paraguayan football midfielder
- Luis Fernández (footballer, born 1993), Spanish footballer
- Luis Fernandez (footballer, born 2001), English football defender
- Luis Fernández (canoeist) (born 1997), Spanish slalom canoeist
- Luis Felipe Fernandez-Salvador

== Luis Fernandes ==
- Luís Carlos Fernandes (born 1985), Brazilian footballer
- Luís Filipe Ângelo Rodrigues Fernandes (born 1979)
- Luís Fernandes Peixoto Gonçalves Sobrinho (born 1961)
- Luiz Felipe Rodrigues Marques (born 1985), Brazilian footballer
- Alexandre Luiz Fernandes (born 1986), Brazilian footballer
- Luis Felipe Fernandes (born 1996), Brazilian-American soccer player
- Luís Sérgio Fernandes (born 1971), Lebanese footballer
