= Antonio Dias =

Antonio Dias may refer to:

- Antônio Dias, a municipality in Minas Gerais, Brazil
- António Dias de Oliveira (1804–1863), Portuguese politician
- Antonio Dias (footballer) (1893–unknown), Brazilian footballer
- António Dias da Cunha (born 1933), Portuguese businessman
- António Dias Cardoso (1933–2006), Angolan politician
- Antônio de Jesus Dias (1942–2020), Brazilian pastor and politician
- Antonio Dias (artist) (1944–2018), Brazilian artist and graphic designer

== See also ==
- Antonio Díaz (disambiguation)
