= Ricardo Silva =

Ricardo Silva may refer to:

== Association football people ==
- Ricardinho (footballer, born 1975), Ricardo Souza Silva, Brazilian football attacking midfielder
- Ricardo Silva (footballer, born 1975), Portuguese football centre-back
- Ricardo Silva (Argentine footballer) (born 1977), Argentinian football midfielder
- Ricardo Silva (footballer, born 1977), Portuguese football forward
- Ricardo Silva (footballer, born 1980), Portuguese football goalkeeper
- Ricardo (footballer, born 1980), Ricardo Jorge Ferreira Pinto da Silva, Cape Verdean football defender
- Ricardinho (footballer, born September 1984) (Ricardo Ferreira da Silva), Brazilian football left-back
- Ricardo Jesus (Ricardo Jesus da Silva, born 1985), Brazilian football striker
- Ricardo Silva (footballer, born 1992), Brazilian football centre-back
- Ricardo Silva (footballer, born 1999), Portuguese football goalkeeper
- Ricardo Silva (football manager) (born 1982), Portuguese football manager

== Others ==
- Ricardo Silva Elizondo (1954–2021), Mexican singer
- Ricardo Silva Romero (born 1975), Colombian writer
- Ricardo Enrique Silva, Cuban doctor and dissident
- Ricardo Silva (musician) (born 1982), Peruvian musician and artist
- Ricardo Silva (American football) (born 1988), American football safety
- Ricardo Silva (politician) (born 1985), Brazilian politician
