= Leonel Grave de Peralta =

Cuban activist and dissident (born 1976)

- Born: May 30, 1976 (age 50); Santiago de Cuba, Cuba

Leonel Grave de Peralta (born May 30, 1976) is a Cuban activist and dissident. He was an active member of the Christian Liberation Movement, Varela Project, and Director of the Independent Bartolomé Massó Library. He was one of the approximately 75 dissidents arrested, tried, and convicted in 2003 as part of the Cuban government's Black Spring.

== Overview ==
=== Political Imprisonment ===
Grave de Peralta was imprisoned in 2003 within the Kilo 5½ Prison in Pinar del Río during the Black Spring. He has been declared as a prisoner of conscience by Amnesty International. Before his imprisonment, he was a multitasking threat to the Castro dictatorship. As a member of the Christian Liberation Movement, Grave de Peralta collected over 100 signatures for the Varela Project's pro-democracy campaign. He had a circulation record of over 700 book loans despite restrictions on independent libraries. During his time as a prisoner of conscience, he was subjected to ill-treatment such as extended periods of solitary confinement and incarcerating in prisons located at extreme distances from his home, breaking many Standard Minimum Rules for the Treatment of Prisoners. He received assistance from Rep. Lincoln Díaz-Balart while incarcerated, who petitioned for his release along with the other political prisoners.

=== Release ===
He was released in 2010 after serving over seven years of a twenty-year sentence as part of a deal struck with the Catholic Church and the Castro dictatorship to take exile within Madrid. After spending a year in Madrid, he moved to Lancaster, Pennsylvania, where he plans to stay until Cuba receives the freedom he initially had fought for: freedom to learn, freedom to worship, freedom to enjoy their inalienable human rights.
