= Georgina Herrera =

Cuban writer (1936–2021)

- Born: 23 April 1936; Jovellanos, Matanzas Province, Cuba
- Died: 13 December 2021 (aged 85); Havana, Cuba
- Other name: Georgina Herrera Cárdenas
- Occupations: Poet, novelist, short-story writer
- Notable work: Always Rebellious / Cimarroneando: Selected Poems
- Spouse(s): Manolo Granados, div.
- Children: 2

Georgina Herrera (23 April 1936 – 13 December 2021) was a Cuban writer of poetry, novels and short stories. She also wrote drama and scripts for radio and television series, as well as for film.

== Biography ==
Georgina Filomena Herrera Cardenas was born on 23 April 1936 in Jovellanos, the capital of Matanzas Province, Cuba. She began writing when she was nine years old, and when she was 16 her first poems were published, in such Havana periodicals as El País and Diario de la Tarde. As Miriam DeCosta-Willis has noted of Herrera's work, "Many of her later poems capture the pain and loneliness of her growing-up years", during which she endured poverty, an absent father and the death of her mother when she was 14.

Family conditions were challenging; According to personal accounts, Herrera lost her mother during her adolescence and was raised with limited financial resources. Despite this, she began to compose poems at the age of nine, demonstrating her early love of writing. Some of her early poems had appeared in Havana based magazines like El Rio and Diario de la Tarde by the time she was 16.

In an interview, Herrera shares an anecdote about when she was 13 or 14 years old. She talks about how when she submitted a poem for a contest and was accused of plagiarism by her principal because she was using sophisticated words normally used by boys. Herrera explains that when she was writing the poem, she did not even know where the words were coming from.

She started publishing poetry in various Havana newspapers at the age of 16.

Aged 20, Herrera moved to Havana in 1956, and worked as a domestic; it was in the homes of her wealthy employers that she met writers, who encouraged her to publish. Early in the Cuban Revolution she became involved with the "Novación Literaria" movement, and began working as a scriptwriter at the Cuban Institute for Radio and Television. She also later became the President of the Radio Section there, along with being a member of the National Council of UNEAC.

Herrera was also an activist, being involved in organizations such as MAGIN, an unofficial women's organization of women in media. She says in an interview, "I think everyone has a right to seek a living any way they can, especially when there's inequality."

She married the novelist Manolo Granados, and they had two children, though later divorced. According to multiple sources, she died on 13 December 2021 in Havana.

== Writing ==
Her first poetry collection, G.H. appeared in 1962, after which she published several other books, characteristically using themes that centre on gender, Afro-Cuban history, and the African legacy: Gentes y cosas (1974), Granos de sol y luna (1974), Grande es el tiempo (1989), Gustadas sensaciones (1996), Gritos (2004), África (2006), and Gatos y liebres or Libro de las conciliaciones (2010). Although best known as a poet, Herrera has also worked as a scriptwriter for radio, television and film. With Daisy Rubiera she co-authored a memoir entitled Golpeando la memoria: Testimonio de una poeta cubana afrodescendiente (Ediciones Unión, 2005).

According to dissident journalist Jorge Olivera Castillo: "A recurring theme in her work reveals a commitment to her race regarding the avatars of their current existence and a past that is also filled with stigmas.... It is also important to point out that she was part of the repressed Grupo El Puente literary and publishing group, which in the 1960s attempted to create a space for art and literature beyond the confines of officialdom. This caused her to be marginalized, as happened with almost all of the group’s members. Yet, despite the obstacles...Georgina Herrera did not opt for exile or silencing her woes. She persevered in her desire to defend her principled position—and she won."

Georgina expresses in an interview that she is not a feminist, emphasizing that her poetry carries feminine qualities. She repeats that she is not a feminist, saying that there is no intention of hiding anything in poetry.

Her work, both poetry and broadcasting, sheds light on the struggles of women, with a particular emphasis on Black women. She emphasizes that she is proud of being a black woman, and that she has become sensitized because of her experience with marginalization. She talks about her childhood, and in particular, her grandparents. She explains that her grandmother was a runaway slave and that her grandfather was born a slave, along with her great-aunts. Herrera spoke about how the stories of those experiences strengthened her.

By 1959, she had developed good relationships with some journalists. She was taken to Prensa libre by the poet Joaquín González Santana, where she showcased a serious dedication to her work.

Herrera won much recognition both in Cuba and abroad. Her work has been translated into various languages and is included in the anthologies Breaking the Silences: An Anthology of 20th-Century Poetry by Cuban Women (ed. Margaret Randall, 1982) and Daughters of Africa (ed. Margaret Busby, 1992). She was also a contributor to Afro-Cuban Voices: On Race and Identity in Contemporary Cuba, edited by Pedro Pérez Sarduy and Jean Stubbs.

A bi-lingual Spanish/English collection of Herrera's work, entitled Always Rebellious/Cimarroneando: Selected Poems (published by Cubanabooks, a US-based non-profit company specialising in Cuban women's literature), won the 2016 International Latino Book Award for Best Bilingual Poetry Book. Herrera said of the collection, whose title references maroons, Africans who escaped from enslavement in the Americas: "The inspiration for the book was my life experiences, it is a definition of me."

=== Work in Media ===
In addition to her literary work, Herrera cooperated significantly with Cuban Radio, film and television. She contributed to cultural programming that aimed to conserve and promote Afro-Cuban history, as well as writing scripts for dramatic shows and educational initiatives. She worked for Instituto Cubano de Radio y Televisión (ICRT) for many years, contributing to popular radio serials and televised cultural programs with her expertise in dialogue and narrative development. Afro- Cuban stories were made more widely known in the country thanks to her work in broadcast media.

Herrera was also involved with African diaspora - focused cultural organizations, such as Grupo AfroCuba, an Afro - Cuban intellectual collaborative established in the 1980s. She contributed historical and memoiristic works to cooperative initiatives through this collective, which aided in the advancement of diverse studies on Black life in Cuba.

Herrera created numerous TV and radio dramas, series and programs over her career. She worked as a screenwriter for many years before being chosen as President of the Writers Section of the Association of Cinema, Radio, and Television (of UNEAC- Union of Writers and Artists of Cuba).

=== Themes ===
- Autobiographical testimony
- African diasporic spirituality
- Resistance and survival as poetic motifs
- Narratives of Black womanhood and motherhood
- Afro - Cuban identity and ancestral memory
- Slavery, trauma, and historical continuity

=== Awards ===
She received several national honors and prizes, including the Medalla Alejo Carpentier and Medalla Raúl Gomez Garcia. She was a juror for several important literary and cultural honors, including the Cuban National Literature Prize and the Casa de Las Americas Prize. The 2016 International Latino Book Award for Best Bilingual Poetry Book went to her bilingual book Always Rebellious/ Cimarroneando. Through readings, films, academic dissertations, and conferences of Afro-Latin writers, her combined works and literary legacy are still studied and recognized on a global scale.

=== Legacy ===
Herrera's groundbreaking contribution to the development of Afro- Cuban women's literacy representation is central to her legacy. As a member of a wave of Black Cuban women authors that greatly enlarged Cuban literary discourse, she is examined alongside individuals like Nancy Morejon and Excilia Saldaña.

Her writings can be found in scholarly studies, university curricula, and international anthologies on:

- Poetry by Afro - Latin Americans
- Black feminist ideas
- The cultural history of Cuba
- African diaspora literature

Herrera is recognized with reviving interest in the voices of Afro- descendant women in Cuban literature and assisting in the preservation of Afro- Cuban memory.

== Selected bibliography ==
- G.H. (Ediciones El Puente, 1962)
- Gentes y cosas (Ediciones Unión, 1974
- Granos de sol y luna (Ediciones Unión, 1974)
- Grande es el tiempo (Ediciones Unión, 1989)
- Gustadas sensaciones (Ediciones Unión, 1996)
- Gritos (Torre de Papel, 2004)
- Golpeando La Memoria (with Daysi Rubiera, 2005)
- África (Ediciones Manglar y Uvero, 2006)
- Gatos y liebres or Libro de las conciliaciones (Ediciones Unión, 2010)
- Always Rebellious/ Cimarroneando: Selected Poems (2014)
- Poesia Completa (Collected Poems)

=== Memoir ===
- With Daisy Rubiera, Golpeando la memoria: Testimonio de una poeta cubana afrodescendiente (Ediciones Unión, 2005)

=== Bi-lingual collection ===
- Always Rebellious/Cimarroneando: Selected Poems (Cubanabooks, 2014, ISBN 978-0-9827860-6-2). Translated from the Spanish by María Rodríguez-Alcalá, Juanamaría Cordones-Cook, and Alexander Cordones Cook.
