= Óscar Espinosa Chepe =

Cuban economist and dissident

- Born: November 29, 1940; Cienfuegos, Cuba
- Died: September 23, 2013 (aged 72); Cercedilla, Spain
- Education: University of Havana
- Occupation: economist
- Known for: reform activism, 2003-2004 imprisonment
- Spouse: Miriam Leiva

Óscar Manuel Espinosa Chepe (Note: In this name that follows Hispanic American naming customs, the first or paternal surname is Espinosa and the second or maternal family name is Chepe.) (November 29, 1940 – September 23, 2013) was a Cuban economist and dissident. He was one of approximately 75 dissidents arrested, tried and convicted in 2003 as part of a crackdown by the Cuban government nicknamed the "Black Spring". He was given a twenty-year sentence on a charge of "activities against the integrity and sovereignty of the State", causing Amnesty International to declare him as a prisoner of conscience.

== Background ==
Espinosa was a graduate of the University of Havana, where he received a degree in economics. He served on Prime Minister Fidel Castro's Economic Advisory Group from 1965 to 1968 before spending fourteen years as the economic adviser at the Cuban embassy in Belgrade, overseeing Cuba's economic and technological cooperation with Hungary, Czechoslovakia, and Yugoslavia. In 1984, he returned to Cuba to work at the National Bank, where he was responsible for trade and tourism.

However, throughout the 1980s, Espinosa increasingly disagreed with national economic policy. When he discussed his views with a colleague in 1992, he was demoted, and four years later was fired. Espinosa began to write critiques of Cuban economic policy which he published overseas. He also hosted a radio program titled Charlando con Chepe ("Chatting with Chepe") in which he discussed the Cuban economy; the program was carried on the U.S.-funded station Radio Martí.

Espinosa was married to independent Cuban journalist Miriam Leiva.

== Arrest and trial ==
On March 19, 2003, Espinosa was arrested during the Black Spring after security agents reportedly spent 10 hours searching his apartment. At a trial on April 3, 2003, Espinosa was accused of "activities against the integrity and sovereignty of the State". Authorities stated that Espinosa had received money from the U.S. government, and that US$13,600 had been discovered sewn into one of his jackets. Espinosa was subsequently convicted and sentenced to 20 years in prison. He was one of approximately 75 dissidents arrested and tried.

Following a rejected appeal by Espinosa, the Representative of the United Nations Commission on Human Rights, Christine Chanet, appealed to President Castro to pardon him. The administration of U.S. President George W. Bush appealed to Castro on Espinosa's behalf, calling on the government to provide treatment for his liver disease. A spokesman described the Cuban government as "going out of its way" to be inhumane to its prisoners. Espinosa's wife Leiva reported that he had lost forty pounds since his arrest and was kept in a cell with no windows or running water.

Leiva became active in the Ladies in White, a group of wives of political prisoners which marched through Havana each Sunday protesting their husbands' detention. She continued to march even after Espinosa's early release.

== Release ==
Espinosa was released from prison along with fellow writer Raúl Rivero on November 29, 2004, after serving just over 19 months of his prison sentence; It was his sixty-fourth birthday. The authorities granted him medical parole because his already poor health had declined seriously during his incarceration.

After his release, he called on the government to release the remaining Black Spring prisoners, stating, "The government really committed a very big error with us. We are completely peaceful and we want only the reconciliation of Cuban society."

In 2006, Espinosa stated his opposition to U.S. funding for the Cuban dissident movement, calling it "counterproductive" and stating that the Cuban people must solve its own problems. Following Raúl Castro's assumption of the presidency, Espinosa expressed his hope that Raúl could be the Deng Xiaoping of Cuba, improving the economy and the standard of living.

== Death ==
He died of liver disease on September 23, 2013, in Spain.

== Bibliography ==
- Óscar Espinosa Chepe (2007). Cuba: ¿revolución o involución? : la realidad cubana de cara a los "Objetivos de desarrollo para el Milenio" acordados en Naciones Unidas. Aduana Vieja. ISBN 978-84-935219-6-7.
- "Artículos escritos por Óscar Espinosa Chepe". El País.
