= Antonio Díaz Sánchez =

Cuban dissident (born 1962)

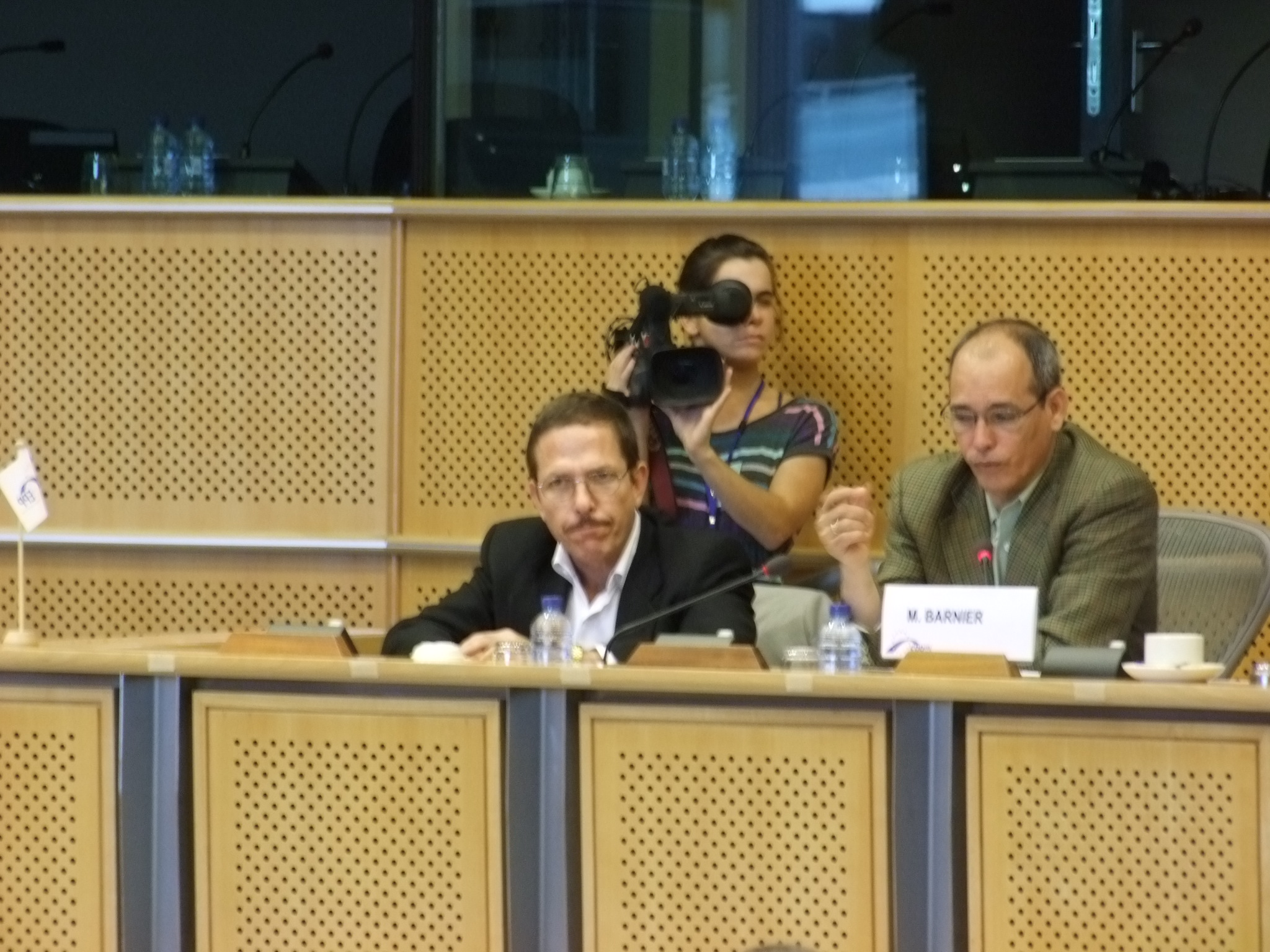
Antonio Díaz Sánchez on the left

Antonio Ramon Díaz Sánchez (born Juni 14, 1962) is a Cuban dissident. He participated in the gathering of signatures for the Varela project and was a member of the Christian Liberation Movement.

Antonio Díaz Sánchez was imprisoned during the 2003 crackdown on dissidents. Amnesty International declared him a prisoner of conscience.

His wife, Gisela Sanchez Verdecia, was active in the Ladies in White.

In 2010, Díaz Sánchez was exiled to Spain along with nineteen other political prisoners.
