= René Gómez Manzano =

Cuban dissident (born 1943)

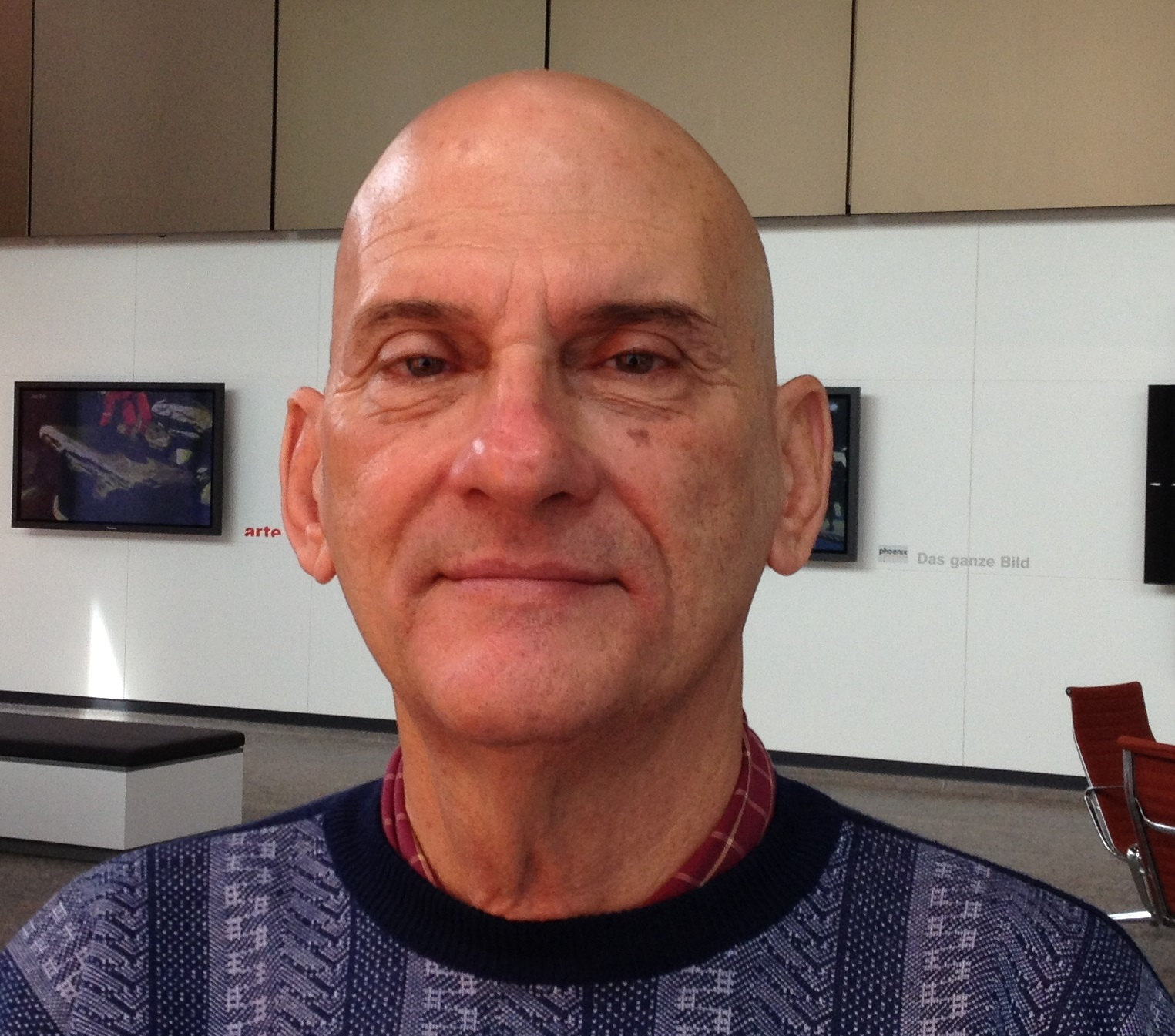
- Born: 19 December 1943; Havana, Cuba
- Occupation: Defense lawyer
- Organization(s): Corriente Agramontista; Internal Dissidence Working Group; Assembly to Promote Civil Society in Cuba
- Known for: Democracy activism, 1997-2000 and 2005-2007 imprisonments
- Awards: ABA International Human Rights Award (1997)

René de Jesús Gómez Manzano (born 19 December 1943 in Havana) is a Cuban dissident known for his essay "The Homeland Belongs to All", which he co-wrote with Marta Beatriz Roque, Vladimiro Roca, and Felix Bonne, as well as his repeated imprisonment by the Cuban government. Amnesty International has named him to be a prisoner of conscience three times.

== Background ==
Gomez Manzano was born in Havana, Cuba. At the age of eleven, he was sent by his parents to study in the Appalachian Mountains region of the U.S. After completing his secondary education, Manzano enrolled in the University of Havana to study law. However, his studies in Cuba were cut short due to the Cuban Revolution. He then earned a scholarship to Moscow's Patrice Lumumba University, where he studied International Law and graduated with a law degree in 1966. As a result of his travels, he is fluent in Spanish, Russian, English, and French. He is a Roman Catholic and an avid chess player.

A defense lawyer, he entered the dissident movement when he began to defend political prisoners in the late 1980s. He became a cofounder of Corriente Agramontista in 1990, an organization of lawyers willing to file suit against the state to force it to fulfill its own laws.

On 6 August 1994, he was arrested and detained in what Amnesty International called "an apparent round-up of known government critics and human rights activists"; the group designated him a prisoner of conscience.

For several years, Gomez Manzano was married to fellow dissident and independent journalist Ana Margarita Perdigón Brito until she decided to leave Cuba with her daughter and seek exile in the United States in 2012.

== ‘The Group of Four’ ==
In 1997, Gomez Manzano, Marta Beatriz Roque, Vladimiro Roca, and Felix Bonne founded the Internal Dissidence Working Group. They then published a paper titled "The Homeland Belongs to All," which discussed Cuba's human rights situation and called for political and economic reforms. They also called for a boycott of elections in Cuba's one-party system and for investors to avoid Cuba, giving several news conferences to discuss their concerns.

Gomez Manzano and the other members of the group were arrested on 16 July 1997. The four were detained for 19 months and then tried for sedition in March 1999 in a one-day trial closed to the foreign press. Gomez Manzano was sentenced to four years' imprisonment. The defendants became known as the "Group of Four". The United States, Canada, the European Union and the Vatican all called for his release. Amnesty International again declared the four prisoners of conscience, "detained solely for peacefully exercising their rights to freedom of expression and association", and called for their immediate release.

Gomez Manzano was released early without explanation on 24 May 2000, having served just under three years in prison. Other members of the Group of Four were released around the same time. In November 2000, the four published another essay, titled "Social Facets", as President Fidel Castro attended a summit in Panama. The essay stated that Cuban education was designed to indoctrinate children, that many children were malnourished from food shortages, and that foreigners in Cuba were allowed privileges—such as cars, computers, and cell phones—that ordinary Cuban people were not.

== Later activism ==
Gomez Manzano was critical of fellow dissident Oswaldo Payá's Varela Project, in which Payá presented the National Assembly of People's Power (NAPP) with 25,000 signatures in an attempt to force a constitutional referendum. Gomez Manzano stated that appeals to the NAPP were useless as long as it was dominated by the Communist Party.

In July 2005, Gomez Manzano was arrested while leaving his home, allegedly to join a protest at the French Embassy with Marta Beatriz Roque's Assembly to Promote Civil Society in Cuba. He was detained without charge for eighteen months, during which time he later stated that he undertook two hunger strikes. Amnesty International again designated him a prisoner of conscience and lobbied for his release.

He was released on 9 February 2007. Having been banned from practicing law, he stated that he relied on aid from "compatriots in exile". He told reporters that he nonetheless intended to remain in Cuba and continue his activism, stating, "Change will come sooner than later".

In an April 2009 diplomatic cable leaked in December 2010, Jonathan D. Farrar, head of the U.S. Interests Section in Havana, described Gomez Manzano, Oswaldo Paya, and other dissidents as "hopelessly out of touch", writing, "They have little contact with younger Cubans and, to the extent they have a message that is getting out, it does not appeal to that segment of society."

== Awards and Distinctions ==
In 1997, the American Bar Association awarded him its International Human Rights Award, but Gomez Manzano was unable to travel to receive it due to his detention. In 1999, Gómez Manzano, along with his co-authors Roque, Roca and Bonne, were awarded the Grand Prize for Press Freedom by the Inter-American Press Association for the publication of "The Homeland Belongs to All." In 2007, an international jury of various bar associations awarded him the Ludovic Trarieux International Human Rights Prize for lawyers, the presentation of which he was again prevented from attending.
