= Alfredo Felipe Fuentes =

Cuban journalist

Alfredo Felipe Fuentes (May 26, 1949 – April 30, 2025) was a Cuban journalist.

He was an independent journalist, a member of an illegal trade union (the United Council of Cuban Workers), and an activist in the Varela project.

He was arrested during the "Black Spring" in 2003 and sentenced to 26 years in prison.
