= José Miguel Martínez Hernández =

Cuban dissident

José Miguel Martínez Hernández is Cuban dissident. He was a representative of Movimiento 24 de Febrero and was involved in Varela project. He was a librarian at General Juan Bruno Zayas Library.

He was sentenced to 13 years in prison in 2003, as a result of Black Spring crackdown on dissidents. His cellmates refer to him as the Green Spider.
