= Alfredo Domínguez Batista =

Cuban dissident

- Born: November 15, 1961 (age 64)
- Occupation: Dissident
- Known for: prisoner of conscience
- Movement: Christian Liberation Movement
- Penalty: 14 years imprisonment

Alfredo Domínguez Batista (born November 15, 1961) is a Cuban dissident. Amnesty International has declared him as a prisoner of conscience.

He is a member of the Christian Liberation Movement and was involved in the Varela project. He was arrested during the Black Spring in 2003 and sentenced to 14 years in jail.
