= Lauzerique =

Lauzerique is a surname. Notable people with the surname include:

- Arnaldo Ramos Lauzerique, Cuban independent economist
- George Lauzerique (born 1947), Cuban-American baseball player
