= Antonio Augusto Villarreal Acosta =

Cuban dissident (born 1950)

Antonio Augusto Villarreal Acosta (born 1 September 1950, Morón, Cuba) is an economist, librarian, and Varela project coordinator. He published reports about problems of the transport facilities, the food supply and the housing shortage.

He was arrested on 19 March 2003, during the Black Spring, a general crackdown on opposition activists. On 3 April, he was sentenced to 15 years in prison. Amnesty International declared him a prisoner of conscience. In 2007, International Society for Human Rights reported that he was in an acutely critical condition, having lost 60% of his former weight.

Villarreal was released on 13 July 2010 following an agreement between Fidel Castro, the Catholic Church, and the government of Spain. He then resettled in La Rioja, Spain.
