= Mijail =

Mijail can be a masculine given name or a surname. Notable people with the name include:

== Given name ==
- Mijail Bárzaga, Cuban dissident
- Mijail Lopez, better known as Mijaín López (born 1982), Cuban Greco-Roman wrestler
- Mijail Mulkay, Cuban actor

== Surname ==
- Johan Mijail, Dominican writer and performance artist

== See also ==
- Michael (given name)
