= Barzaga =

Barzaga is a surname. Notable people with the surname include:

- Elpidio Barzaga Jr. (1950–2024), Filipino lawyer and politician
- Jenny Barzaga (born 1975), Filipino nurse and politician
- Kiko Barzaga (born 1998), Filipino politician and animal welfare advocate
- Mijail Bárzaga, Cuban dissident
- Norbelis Bárzaga (born 1975), Cuban sport shooter
- Third Barzaga, Filipino politician
