= Ricardo Gonzalez =

Ricardo Gonzalez may refer to:

- Ricardo González Alfonso (born 1950), Cuban journalist
- Ricardo González (footballer, born 1965), Chilean footballer
- Ricardo Primitivo González (born 1925), Argentina basketball player
- Ricardo González (bobsleigh) (1900–1947), Argentine bobsledder
- Ricardo González (golfer) (born 1969), Argentine golfer
- Ricardo González (footballer, born 1974), Costa Rican footballer
- Ricardo González (Paraguayan footballer) (born 1945)
- Ricardo González (racing driver) (born 1978), Mexican racing driver
- Ricardo González (rower) (born 1937), Argentine Olympic rower
- Ricardo González (swimmer) (born 1947), Colombian swimmer
- Ricardo Gonzalez (politician) (born 1946), American politician
- Ricardo Maldonado Gonzalez, American convicted murderer

== See also ==
- Ricardo Gonzales (disambiguation)
