= De Cuba =

Cuban periodical

De Cuba was the first privately owned, independent magazine in Cuba since the end of Fulgencio Batista dictatorship. It was published on a bimonthly basis.

Only three issues of the magazine were published: December 2002, February 2003 and September 2003.

== Journalists ==
- Ricardo González Alfonso
