= Blas Giraldo Reyes Rodríguez =

Cuban dissident (born 1955)

Blas Giraldo Reyes Rodríguez (born August 7, 1955) is a Cuban librarian and a member of Varela project. He was imprisoned in 2003 during a crackdown on dissidents and sentenced to 25 years in prison. Amnesty International has declared him as a prisoner of conscience.

His wife, Isel Acosta, is a member of Ladies in White. Isel Acosta has been assaulted by mobs: "banging on windows and doors, shouting insults and making threats against her life. The Cuban government has organized mob assaults against its critics in the past, and there are indications of official involvement in this incident, as well".
