= Nelson Aguiar Ramírez =

Cuban dissident

Nelson Alberto Aguiar Ramírez is a Cuban dissident. He was arrested and sentenced to 13 years in jail during the Black Spring in 2003. Amnesty International declared him a prisoner of conscience. He is president of the unofficial Partido Ortodoxo de Cuba (Cuban Orthodox Party).

He is an electrician by trade.

== See also ==
- Black Spring (Cuba)
