= Roberto de Miranda =

Cuban professor (born 1947)

- Born: 1947 (age 78–79); Camaguey, Cuba
- Occupation: Professor

Roberto de Miranda (born 1947 in Camagüey, Cuba) is a Cuban professor and head of the College of Independent Teachers of Cuba, a non-governmental organization that he founded in July 1992. The organization seeks "the de-ideologization of education in Cuba and denounces violations against students and professors that do not share the political ideals of the system." Roberto de Miranda also founded the Félix Varela Independent Library in 2000.

The goal of this system is to create false nationalism - something that has hurt our youth tremendously. [...] It is a grotesque invention, a lie that has been perpetrated for 40 years. [...] There isn't one young person on the island who believes in Communism. Our youth is more rebellious by the day and less [academically] prepared. They reject the system because there is too much manipulation. We are fooling ourselves if we think otherwise.

He was imprisoned during the Black Spring crackdown on dissidents in 2003 and sentenced to 20 years in prison. Amnesty International declared him as a prisoner of conscience.

He received the 2003 Pedro Luis Boitel Freedom Award.

He was released after 14 months of jail, possibly because the Cuban government feared the international backlash if he had died in jail.
