= Omar Pernet Hernández =

Cuban librarian

- Known for: Cuban dissident, human rights activist

Omar Pernet Hernández is a Cuban librarian, human rights activist, and a former political prisoner.

He was imprisoned during the Black Spring in 2003 and released to exile in Spain in 2008. Amnesty International considered him a prisoner of conscience.
