= Vladimiro Roca =

Cuban dissident (1942–2023)

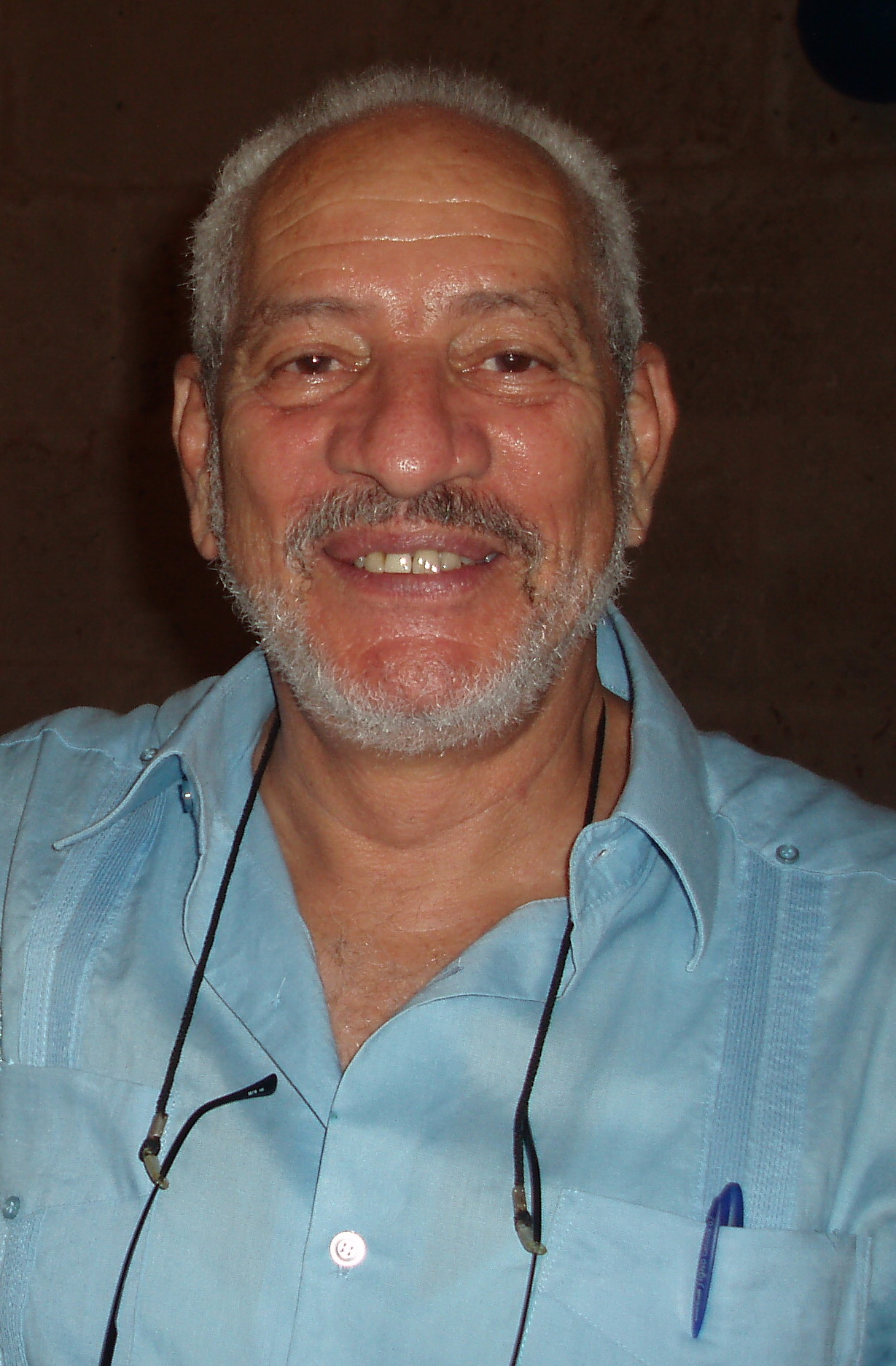
- Roca in 2007
- Born: 21 December 1942; Havana, Cuba
- Died: 30 July 2023 (aged 80); Havana, Cuba
- Occupations: Activist; dissident
- Known for: 1997–2002 imprisonment with pro-democracy "Group of Four"
- Spouse: Magaly de Armas
- Children: 2
- Father: Blas Roca Calderio
- Awards: Civil Courage Prize (2002)

Vladimiro Roca Antúnez (21 December 1942 – 30 July 2023) was a Cuban dissident and leader of the Cuban Social-Democratic Party. A member of the "Group of Four", he was imprisoned from 1997 to 2002 after co-authoring a paper calling for democratic reforms.

== Early life ==
Vladimiro Roca Antúnez was born in Havana, Cuba, on 21 December 1942 and was named after early Soviet leader Vladimir Lenin. His father was Blas Roca Calderio, a co-founder of the Communist Party of Cuba. In 1961, at the age of 18, he was among the first batch of young elite selected for training as fighter pilots in the Soviet Union. He served for ten years in the Cuban Revolutionary Armed Forces and subsequently worked as an economist for the government. He became an active dissident in 1991, four years after his father's death. Roca and his father were close, though the son never had the same enthusiasm for Fidel Castro's socialist revolution. He was then fired from his state job.

== The Group of Four ==
In August 1996, Roca linked up with three other Cuban professionals who favored change: economist Marta Beatriz Roque, engineer Félix Bonne Carcassés, and attorney René Gómez Manzano, and formed the Working Group for Internal Dissidence. The group published a paper titled "The Homeland Belongs to All", which discussed Cuba's human rights situation and called for political and economic reforms. They also called for a boycott of elections in Cuba's one-party system and for investors to avoid Cuba, giving several news conferences to discuss their concerns. The Los Angeles Times columnist described Roca and Bonne's criticism as carrying extra weight because they were "the only known black dissidents in Cuba", and stated that "given Castro's claim that the revolution has ended racial discrimination, he can ill afford to let well-educated blacks challenge him, even as gently as the four defendants had done."

Roca and the other members of the group were arrested on 16 July 1997. The four were detained for nineteen months, then tried for sedition in March 1999 in a one-day trial that was closed to foreign press. Roca was sentenced to five years of imprisonment. The defendants became known as the "Group of Four". The United States, Canada, the European Union, and the Vatican all called for his release, while Amnesty International declared them prisoners of conscience, "detained solely for peacefully exercising their rights to freedom of expression and association".

Roque, Bonne, and Gómez were released in May 2000, but Roca was held for an additional two years. The Human Rights Committee of the American National Academy of Sciences speculated that he was "singled out for particularly severe treatment because he had been a member of the Cuban Communist Party and his father had been one of its founding members".

Roca entered prison an atheist, but was baptized Roman Catholic on 24 September 1999; he credited his new faith with helping him endure imprisonment. He was released from prison on 6 May 2002, 70 days before his five-year sentence would have expired. CNN described the early release as "apparently a conciliatory gesture" by Castro ahead of a visit by former American president Jimmy Carter. Roca told reporters, "I plan to continue working like I was before being arrested ... to continue the struggle because I believe I will see a change in Cuba before too long". Roca met with Carter a week after his release.

== Later activism ==
In March 2003, Roca, Roque, and Elizardo Sánchez lobbied the European Union not to sign a trade agreement with Cuba. Roca stated that "we do not believe a country with such a black human rights record should be allowed to join". Roca also criticized the EU's lifting of sanctions against Cuba in 2008, accusing leaders of pushing the measure through against the popular will.

In May 2005, Roca and Roque organized a meeting of 200 dissidents which was, unusually, not interrupted by police. Roque described it as "the first such gathering in Fidel Castro's 46 years of communist rule" and "a point of departure" for further discussion.

== Personal life ==
Roca was married to Magaly de Armas and they had a son and a daughter. He died from complications of diabetes and Alzheimer's disease in Havana, on 30 July 2023 at the age of 80.

== Recognition ==
In 2002, he won the Civil Courage Prize, which recognizes "steadfast resistance to evil at great personal risk—rather than military valor."

== See also ==
- Cuban dissident movement
