= Víctor Rolando Arroyo Carmona =

Cuban geographer and journalist

Víctor Rolando Arroyo Carmona is a Cuban geographer and journalist who was imprisoned on March 18, 2003, and sentenced to 26 years in prison, according to the Committee to Protect Journalists. Carmona ended a 25 hunger strike on October 4, 2005, when he was removed from the prison and placed in a hospital in critical condition.

He was a journalist for the independent news agency Unión de Periodistas y Escritores Cubanos Independientes and directed a local independent library belonging to Varela project.
