= Normando Hernández González =

Cuban writer and journalist (born 1969)

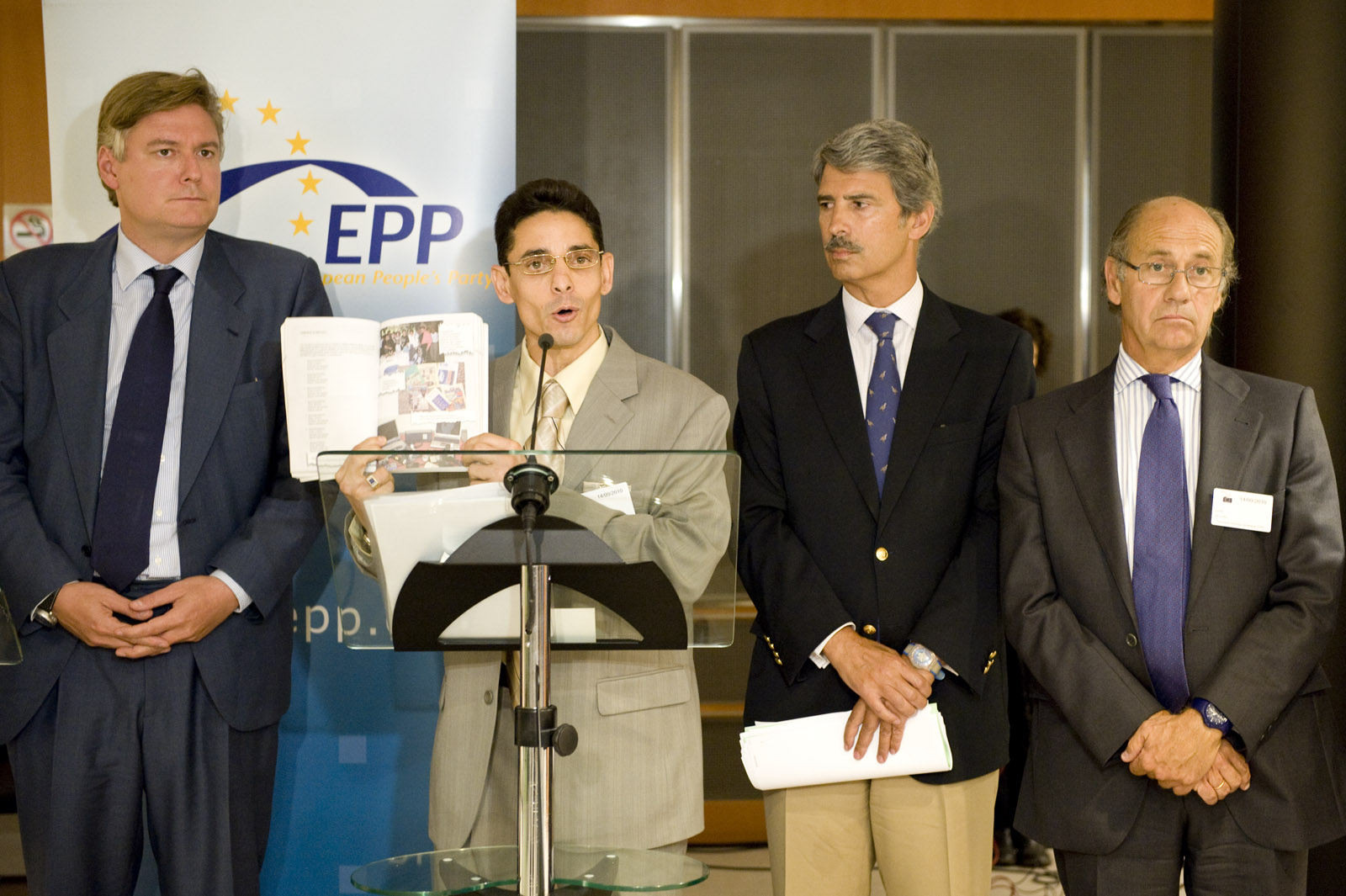
- Addressing the EPP Political Assembly
- Born: October 21, 1969 (age 56); Camagüey, Cuba
- Education: Self-taught
- Occupation: Journalist
- Known for: Political Prisoner
- Notable work: The Art of Torture: Memories of a Former Cuban Prisoner of Conscience
- Spouse: Yarai Reyes Marin
- Parent: Blanca Gonzales (Mother)

Normando Hernández González (born Camagüey, October 21, 1969) is a Cuban-born writer and journalist who now lives in the United States.

He was the youngest of 75 persons rounded up by Cuban authorities on March 18, 2003, a day that is now commonly known as "Black Spring". Arrested for having criticized conditions under the Fidel Castro government, he was held for seven years in various prisons, from 2003 to 2010. During his incarceration, he spent long periods in solitary confinement and was subject to beatings and torture.

Released in 2010 as a result of efforts by the Catholic Church and the government of Spain, Hernández spent several months in Madrid, where, he later said, he and his family were treated abusively by Spanish authorities, whom he accused of serving as accomplices to "the Castro brothers". In 2011, he accepted asylum in the United States, where he founded the Cuban Institute for Freedom of Expression and the Press and the Cuban Foundation for Human Rights and became a Reagan-Fascell Democracy Fellow at the National Endowment for Democracy.

== Early life and education ==
Hernández is a self-taught journalist who founded the Camagüey College of Independent Journalists in his hometown of Camagüey. He is the son of Normando Hernández and Blanca Rosa González. His wife is Yarai Reyes Marin.

== Arrest ==
On March 18, 2003, a day that would later become known as "Black Spring", Hernández and 74 other journalists, writers, and human-rights activists were rounded up by Cuban authorities in an extensive crackdown on dissent. Under Article 91 of Cuba's Criminal Code, Hernández was sentenced to 25 years for writing about the poor quality of government services and for criticizing the state's management of tourism, agriculture, fishing, and other industries.

== Imprisonment ==
=== 2003–2006 ===
In August 2003, he and seven other prisoners held a hunger strike to protest prison conditions. As a result, Hernández was moved to Kilo 5½ prison in Pinar del Río, more than 400 miles from Camagüey. In a prison essay in which he described in detail the meals he was given, Hernández wrote that "prisoners in Cuba are being held in conditions similar to pigs in a pigsty."

In March 2004, Hernández's wife, Yaraí Reyes Marín, was given permission to visit him and traveled to Pinar del Rio. At the prison she was stripped and interrogated and denied access to her husband. She also found out that Hernández had allegedly been beaten by the prison's security chief. He was in very poor health, but was being denied medical care. In December 2006, Hernández suffered fainting spells and was admitted to the Amalia Simoni Provincial Hospital in Camagüey. Although he was in critical condition, he was kept for a week in a room without a bed, table, or chair, where he sat on a bucket and had his food pushed under the door on a tray. On December 27, 2006, Hernández was sent from the hospital to Kilo 7 prison in Camagüey on the grounds that the hospital lacked the resources needed to treat him. In prison, his health further deteriorated and he lost over 35 pounds. On September 14, 2007, Hernández was transferred from Kilo 7 Prison to the Carlos J. Finlay Military Hospital in Havana, where he was diagnosed with several digestive ailments.

As his health deteriorated, the PEN American Center and other groups campaigned with increasing urgency for the release of Hernández and other "Black Spring" inmates. In April 2007, the Costa Rican legislature, at the urging of Hernández's mother, granted Hernández a humanitarian visa. In June, Cuban authorities announced their refusal to give him an exit permit.

=== 2007–Release ===
On August 14, 2007, Bloomberg reporter Jeremy Gerard reported that Costa Rican legislator Jose Manuel Echandi Meza, whose attempts to secure Hernández's release had previously been rebuffed by the Cuban government, had "redoubled his efforts" and was now working with an unnamed "Western European government." On September 10, 2007, Echandi Meza formally complained to the UN about the conditions under which Hernández was being held.

After the February 28, 2008, signing by Cuba's Foreign Minister, Felipe Pérez Roque, of the International Covenant on Civil and Political Rights (ICCPR) and the International Covenant on Economic, Social and Cultural Rights (ICESCR), which guarantee a multitude of rights, including freedom of opinion and expression and freedom from cruel, degrading treatment, Larry Siems of the PEN American Center called on Cuba "to move quickly to abide by the terms of these covenants" by releasing Hernández and other dissidents still in prison.

On May 7, 2008, Hernández was secretly moved from the Finlay Hospital, where he was still receiving "essential medical treatments," to Kilo 7 Prison, where he was placed in solitary confinement.

In May, a fellow dissident, Marta Beatriz Roque, informed a reporter that Hernández's cell was "known as the ‘cell of the condemned" and that the conditions under which he was living were "subhuman." He had no light or potable water, "and the heat is unbearable." Also, he was being fed "two spoonfuls of rice with worms, watery meat, lentils and a rotten mass, commonly known as ‘dog vomit.’"

On January 8, 2009, after developing a growth on his Adam's apple, Hernández was transferred to a Havana prison hospital, Combinado del Este. Six weeks later, on February 25, he was returned to Kilo 7, even more ill, according to his wife, Yarai Reyes Marin, than when he had been admitted to the hospital. Reportedly, he had been given "only cursory examinations" at the hospital and was down to 114 pounds. Reyes Martin told a reporter that she believed Hernández was being held, even as some other dissidents were being released, "because he insists upon his status as a political prisoner....He refuses to subjugate himself. The prisoners look up to him. So the prison authorities hate him even more." Asked if she wished Hernández would "bend a little in order to come home to his family," she said no. "He’s been through so much -- only to cave in now? He would rather be dead than dishonored."

In October 2009, Hernández was again admitted to Combinado del Este, this time with left ventricular atrophy and polyps on his gallbladder.

Amnesty International declared Hernández a prisoner of conscience in March 2010. In 2007 González received in absentia the Dr. Rainer Hildebrandt Human Rights Award endowed by Alexandra Hildebrandt. The award is given annually in recognition of extraordinary, non-violent commitment to human rights.

In 2010, the committee to Protect Journalists published a short piece by Hernández about his life in prison, with "the murmurs of suffering, the plaintive screams of torture, the screeching bars, the unmistakable music of padlocks, the garrulous sentinels....the dismal silence of those petrified dungeons. The eternally cold nights spent in punishment cells. The rats, the cockroaches, the spiders...and most of all the swarm of mosquitoes that drained my blood every second of my ephemeral existence in that hell." He described the food: "the burundanga, that main course composed, so they say, of animal guts, but which everyone knows contains skull, brain and even excrement," and the "rotten tenca, the fish that resembled a magnet covered with pins when it was served to us."

== Exile ==
=== Spain ===
On July 10, 2010, as a result of talks between the Cuban government, the Catholic Church, and the Spanish foreign minister, Hernández and two other "Black Spring" dissidents, Dr. José Luis García Paneque and Léster Luis González Pentón, were released from prison. On July 13 Hernández, his wife, his daughter, and the two other dissidents flew from Havana to Spain. PEN American Center President Kwame Anthony Appiah called his release "a very hopeful sign" and "an enormous relief to PEN and to all those around the world who have followed his ordeal."

Hernández and the other dissidents who were flown to Spain were given the option of staying in Spain or living in United States or Chile, both of which had offered the men asylum. Hernández and his family spent what a reporter would later describe as "a jarring 10 months at a shabby hostel in an industrial section of Madrid." Hernández complained that in Madrid, he and his family had not found freedom, but had instead been treated with contempt and cruelty. "We had no status in Spain, ninguno," he said. "Once we arrived, we asked for political asylum. We got no response. By the time I left after 10 months, the Spanish government, in violation of its own law, had still not responded to my petition for political asylum."

During his time in Spain, Hernández was invited to a conference in Norway, but Spanish officials refused to let him go, purportedly because of his "International Protection in Spain" and "Political Asylum" status, but really, in his view, because the Spanish government was serving as an "accomplice to the totalitarian government of the Castro brothers." He wrote an essay describing in detail his "trip which never happened."

=== United States ===
In May 2011, Hernández, his wife, Yarai, and their 9-year-old daughter, Daniela, moved from Madrid to Miami.

After settling in Miami, Hernández founded the Cuban Institute for Freedom of Expression and the Press, which promotes citizen journalism in Cuba. He also co-founded the Cuban Foundation for Human Rights.

In February 2012, Hernández testified before the House Subcommittee on Africa, Global Health, and Human Rights. On June 7, 2012, Hernández testified before the Senate Foreign Relations Subcommittee on the Western Hemisphere.

In another March 2013 interview, he described his new life in exile. "I had to relearn how to live with my wife and daughter. They also had to get used to me....It's very hard to live away from your own country, but it is important to enjoy a life of freedom." He said he was happy to see his daughter thriving in her studies and also happy to support his fellow Cubans' struggle for freedom."

In 2015, University of New Orleans Press released a memoir about Hernández's experiences in Cuba entitled Normando Hernández González: 7 Years In Prison For Writing About Bread .
