= Black Spring (Cuba) =

2003 crackdown on Cuban dissidents

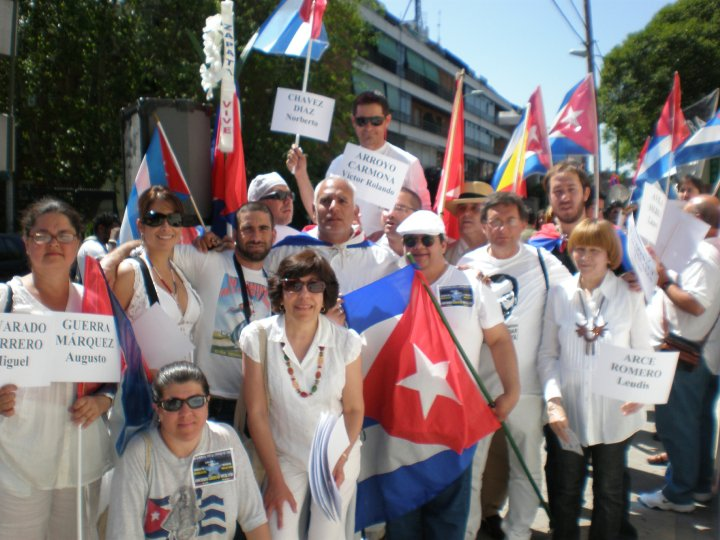
Cubans protesting in Madrid in 2010

Black Spring was the 2003 crackdown by the Cuban Government on Cuban dissidents. The government imprisoned 75 dissidents, including 29 journalists on the basis that they were acting as agents of the United States by accepting funds from the US government and George W. Bush's administration at the time. Amnesty International described the 75 Cubans as "prisoners of conscience". The Cuban government stated at the time: "the 75 individuals arrested, tried and sentenced in March/April 2003... are demonstrably not independent thinkers, writers or human rights activists, but persons directly in the pay of the US government. [...] [T]hose who were arrested and tried were charged not with criticizing the [Cuban] government, but for receiving American government funds and collaborating with U.S. diplomats".

The crackdown on dissidents began on 18 March, during the US invasion of Iraq, and lasted two days. It received international condemnation from several countries, with critical statements coming from George W. Bush's administration, the European Union, the United Nations and various human rights groups. Responding to the crackdown, the European Union imposed sanctions on Cuba in 2003, which were then lifted in January 2008. The European Union declared at the time that the arrests "constituted a breach of the most elementary human rights, especially as regards freedom of expression and political association". Some criticized the dissidents, such as former CIA agent Philip Agee, who described them as "central to current US government efforts to overthrow the Cuban government and destroy the work of the Revolution." US sociologist and scholar James Petras noted that "No country in the world tolerates or labels domestic citizens paid by, and working for a foreign power to act for its imperial interests, as 'dissidents'".

All of the dissidents were eventually released, most of whom were exiled to Spain starting in 2010.

On 11 April 2003, Cuban authorities executed three men by firing squad, after finding them guilty of hijacking a ferry and kidnapping 30 people to flee to the United States, in what is sometimes seen as part of the Black Spring crackdown.

== Imprisoned people ==
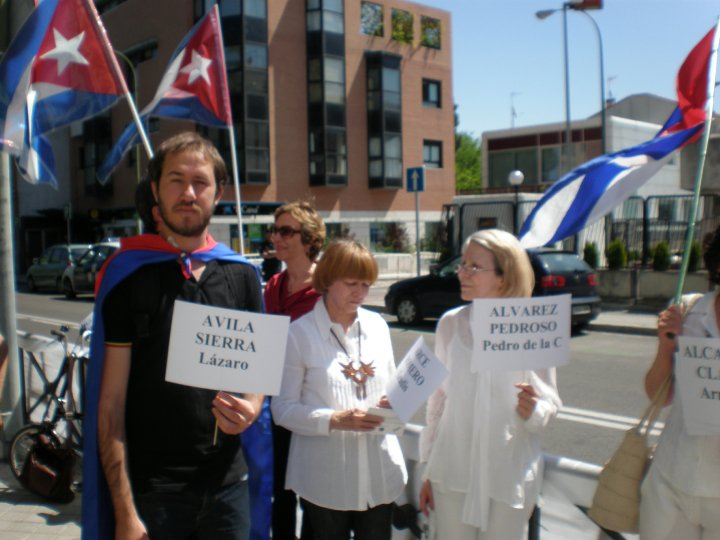
Demonstrators holding up signs of imprisoned people during the Black Spring

Manuel Vázquez Portal received the International Press Freedom Award in 2003. Héctor Maseda Gutiérrez received the same prize in 2008, while locked up in a maximum-security prison.

List of 75 jailed dissidents and their prison sentences:

- Nelson Aguiar Ramírez 13 years
- Osvaldo Alfonso Valdés 18 years
- Pedro Pablo Alvarez Ramos 25 years
- Pedro Argüelles Morán 20 years
- Víctor Rolando Arroyo Carmona 26 years
- Mijail Barzaga Lugo 15 years
- Oscar Elías Biscet González 25 years
- Margarito Broche Espinosa 25 years
- Marcelo Cano Rodríguez 18 years
- Roberto de Miranda Hernández 20 years
- Carmelo Díaz Fernández 15 years
- Eduardo Díaz Fleitas 21 years
- Antonio Díaz Sánchez 20 years
- Alfredo Domínguez Batista 14 years
- Oscar Espinosa Chepe 20 years
- Alfredo Felipe Fuentes 26 years
- Efrén Fernández Fernández 12 years
- Adolfo Fernández Sainz 15 years
- José Daniel Ferrer García 25 years
- Luis Enrique Ferrer García 28 years
- Orlando Fundora Alvarez 18 years
- Próspero Gaínza Agüero 25 years
- Miguel Galván Gutiérrez 26 years
- Julio César Gálvez Rodríguez 15 years
- Edel José García Díaz 15 years
- José Luis García Paneque 24 years
- Ricardo Gonzales Alfonso 20 years
- Diosdado González Marrero 20 years
- Léster González Pentón 20 years
- Alejandro González Raga 14 years
- Jorge Luis González Tanquero 20 years
- Leonel Grave de Peralta 20 years
- Iván Hernández Carrillo 25 years
- Normando Hernández González 25 years
- Juan Carlos Herrera Acosta 20 years
- Regis Iglesias Ramírez 18 years
- José Ubaldo Izquierdo Hernandez 16 years
- Reinaldo Labrada Peña 6 years
- Librado Linares García 20 years
- Marcelo López Bañobre 15 years
- José Miguel Martínez Hernández 13 years
- Héctor Maseda Gutiérrez 20 years
- Mario Enrique Mayo Hernández 20 years
- Luis Milán Fernández 13 years
- Nelson Moliné Espino 20 years
- Angel Moya Acosta 20 years
- Jesús Mustafá Felipe 25 years
- Felix Navarro Rodríguez 25 years
- Jorge Olivera Castillo 18 years
- Pablo Pacheco Avila 20 years
- Héctor Palacios Ruíz 25 years
- Arturo Pérez de Alejo Rodríguez 20 years
- Omar Pernet Hernández 25 years
- Horacio Piña Borrego 20 years
- Fabio Prieto Llorente 20 years
- Alfredo Pulido López 14 years
- José Gabriel Ramón Castillo 20 years
- Arnaldo Ramos Lauzerique 18 years
- Blas Giraldo Reyes Rodríguez 25 years
- Raúl Rivero Castañeda 20 years
- Alexis Rodríguez Fernández 15 years
- Omar Rodríguez Saludes 27 years
- Marta Beatriz Roque Cabello 20 years
- Omar Moisés Ruiz Hernández 18 years
- Claro Sánchez Altarriba 18 years
- Ariel Sigler Amaya 20 years
- Guido Sigler Amaya 20 years
- Ricardo Enrique Silva 10 years
- Fidel Suárez Cruz 20 years
- Manuel Ubals González 20 years
- Julio Antonio Valdés Guevara 20 years
- Miguel Valdés Tamayo 15 years
- Héctor Raúl Valle Hernández 12 years
- Manuel Vázquez Portal 18 years
- Antonio Augusto Villareal Acosta 15 years

== Related movements ==
The wives of imprisoned activists, led by Laura Pollán, formed a movement called Ladies in White. The movement received the Sakharov Prize for Freedom of Thought from the European Parliament in 2005.

== See also ==
- Cuban dissidents
