= Pablo Pacheco Avila =

Cuban journalist

Pablo Pacheco Avila is a Cuban journalist who has contributed to the Ciego de Ávila Independent Journalists Cooperative (CAPI). He has been exiled from Cuba since 2010.

== Information ==
Pablo Pacheco Avila was about 35 years old when he was put in prison. He is married and has one son.

== Political Prisoner ==
Pacheco Avila was arrested for six hours by Fidel Castro's officers after trying to video two totalitarian police officers mishandling two women. Avila was imprisoned during the Black Spring in 2003 and sentenced to 20 years in prison for providing news coverage on a peaceful pro-democracy meeting. He was released in 2010, and he deported to Spain. He now lives in Malaga.

== See also ==
- Cuban dissident movement
