= Raúl Rivero =

Cuban poet, journalist, and dissident (1945–2021)

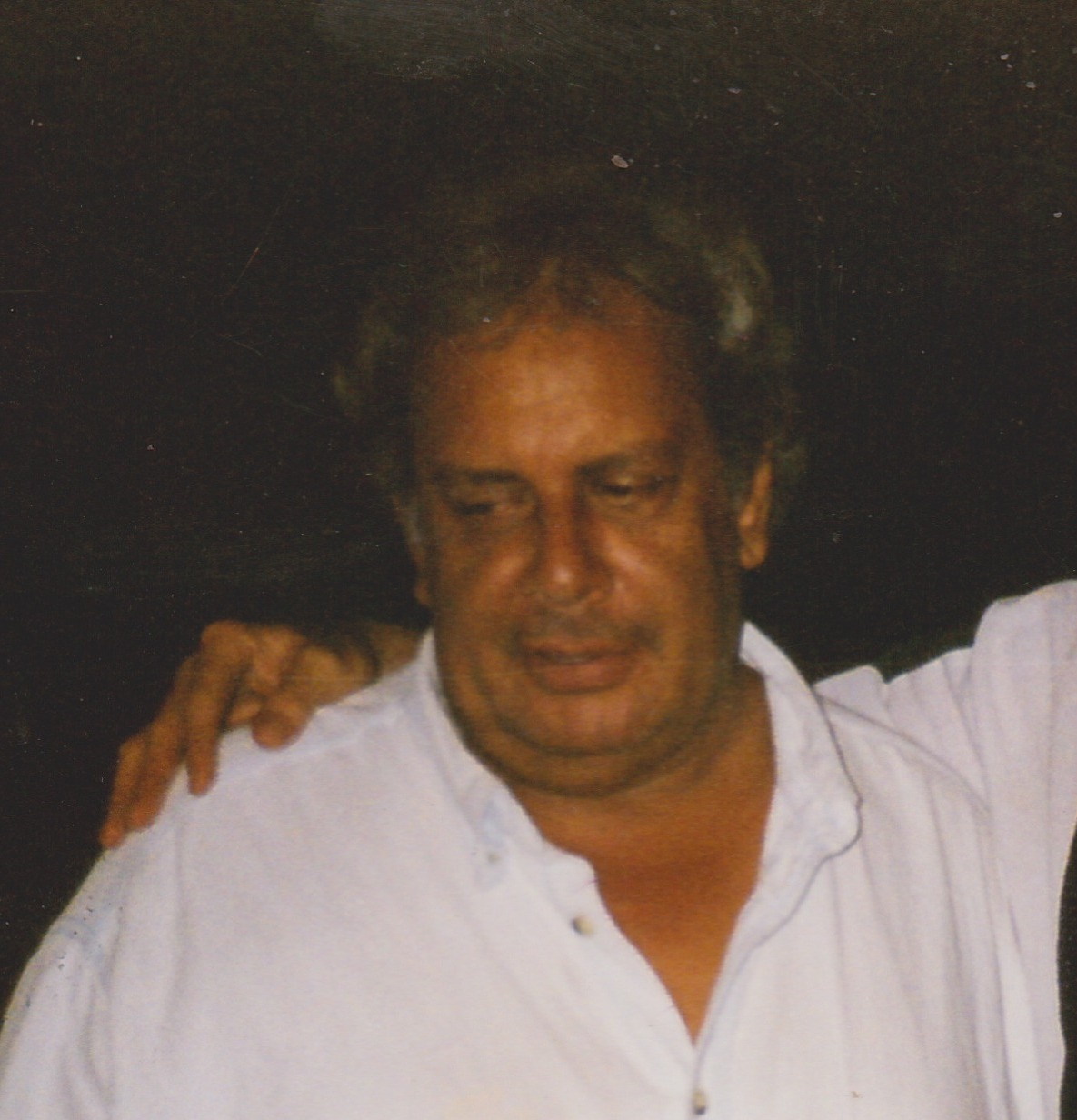
Rivero in 1998

Raúl Ramón Rivero Castañeda (23 November 1945 – 6 November 2021) was a Cuban poet, journalist, and dissident.

== Early life and career ==
Rivero was born on 23 November 1945 in Morón, Camagüey, in central Cuba.

In his youth, he was an ardent follower of Fidel Castro and the Cuban Revolution. He was among the first generation of journalists to graduate after the triumph of the Revolution. From 1973 to 1976 he was the chief correspondent of the official Cuban press in Moscow. He also served as chairman of the pro-regime National Union of Writers and Artists (UNEAC). He was then known as "the Poet of the Revolution", and associated with the major cultural figures of communist Cuba.

== Dissident work ==
In 1999 Rivero was awarded Columbia University's Maria Moors Cabot prize for International Journalism. The following year, he was named as one of the International Press Institute's 50 World Press Freedom Heroes of the past 50 years.

During the Cuban government's 2003 "Black Spring" crackdown on dissidents, Rivero was charged with "acting against Cuban independence and attempting to divide Cuban territorial unity", as well as with writing "against the government", organizing "subversive meetings" at his home, and collaborating with U.S. diplomat James Cason. Rivero was convicted and sentenced to twenty years' imprisonment. He spent his first 11 months in a tiny one-man cell with no windows or any contact to the outside world. The arrest and imprisonment of Rivero was later defended by Cuban writer and culture minister Abel Prieto who argued that Rivero "was not arrested for his views, but for receiving US funding for his collaboration with a country that has besieged our island." Rivero asserted, in prison interrogations as well as in public, that all the funds which he received consisted of fees for his articles, paid by the publishing media, not by governments or political organizations. His account of his life and his treatment by the Cuban government is given in his book "Proof of Contact".

In November 2004 he was released following international pressure on Cuba and subsequently relocated to Spain, and was awarded the UNESCO/Guillermo Cano World Press Freedom Prize.

== See also ==
- Human rights in Cuba
- Cuban dissident movement
- Varela Project
