= Manuel Díaz Gil =

Spanish footballer

Liz
Personal information
- Full name: Manuel Díaz Gil
- Date of birth: 29 March 1929
- Place of birth: Seville, Spain
- Date of death: 28 March 1966 (aged 36)
- Place of death: Seville, Spain
- Position: Forward

Youth career
- Sevilla

Senior career*
Years	Team	Apps	(Gls)
1952–1956	Sevilla	86	(21)
1956–1957	Deportivo La Coruña	11	(3)
1957–1958	Sevilla	5	(0)
1958–1960	Almería	32	(2)
Total		134	(26)
- * Club domestic league appearances and goals

Manuel Díaz Gil (29 March 1929 – 28 March 1966), commonly known as Liz, was a Spanish footballer who played as a forward.

== Club career ==
Born in Seville, Andalusia, Liz played six seasons in La Liga, five with Sevilla FC and one with Deportivo de La Coruña. He made his debut in the competition with the latter on 21 September 1952 in a 2–6 away loss against RCD Español, and scored his first goal on 23 November of the same year, but in a 1–2 home defeat to Racing de Santander; on 22 February 1953, against precisely Deportivo, he netted a hat-trick in a 6–2 home rout, going on to add a further two during the campaign to help his team rank in fifth position.

Liz suffered relegation with Deportivo in 1957, but scored against former club Sevilla in a 3–1 home success. He retired professionally in 1960, with AD Almería from Segunda División.

== Personal life ==
Manuel's younger brother, Antonio, was also a footballer and a forward. He too represented Sevilla.
