= Pedro Argüelles Morán =

Cuban cartographer and journalist

Pedro Argüelles Morán (pseudonym Pedro del Sol) is a Cuban cartographer and journalist who was arrested during the "Black Spring" in 2003 and sentenced to 20 years in prison.

Argüelles Morán joined the Comité Cubano por los Derechos Humanos (Cuban Committee for Human Rights) in 1992. He was a director of the independent news agency Cooperativa Avileña de Periodistas Independientes at the time of his arrest.
