= Arturo Pérez de Alejo Rodríguez =

Cuban dissident

- Born: 1951; Manicaragua, Villa Clara, Cuba
- Died: 25 January 2017 (aged 66); Miami, Florida, U.S.
- Known for: Cuban dissident
- Spouse: Ada Moraima León Sabina
- Children: Ailén, Claudia

Arturo Pérez de Alejo Rodríguez (1951 – 25 January 2017) was a Cuban dissident and had been declared as a prisoner of conscience by Amnesty International.

He was president of the human rights organization Frente Escambray and activist supporter of the Varela project. He was a member of the Democratic Action Movement, National Action Party and the Independent Democratic Front.

He was imprisoned during the Black Spring in 2003 and sentenced to 20 years in prison. At the time of his arrest he was president of the Escambray Human Rights Front.

Pérez de Alejo Rodríguez died on 25 January 2017 in Miami, Florida, U.S. at the age of 66.
