= Marcelo Cano Rodríguez =

Cuban physician

Marcelo Cano Rodríguez is a Cuban physician and a member of the Comisión Cubana de Derechos Humanos y Reconciliación Nacional (CCDHRN, English: Cuban Commission for Human Rights and National Reconciliation).

Marcelo Cano Rodríguez was imprisoned during the Black Spring crackdown on dissidents in 2003.
