= Nelson Moliné Espino =

Cuban dissident

Nelson Moliné Espino is a Cuban dissident who was declared a prisoner of conscience by Amnesty International.

He was president of the unofficial Confederación de Trabajadores Democráticos de Cuba (English: Confederation of Democratic Workers of Cuba), and a member of the unofficial Partido 30 de noviembre (English: 30 November Party). He was arrested during the Black Spring in 2003 and sentenced to 21 years in jail. After Tripartite talks between the Cuban government, the Catholic Church in Cuba and the Spanish government in 2010 he was released on July 7, 2010, and traveled to Spain.
