= Félix Bonne =

Cuban academic

- Born: Félix Bonne Carcassés c. 1939
- Died: January 6, 2017 (aged 77); Havana, Cuba
- Occupation: engineering professor
- Known for: imprisonment with pro-democracy "Group of Four"
- Relatives: Luis Bonne Bonne (paternal grandfather)

Félix Bonne Carcassés (c. 1939–2017) was a Cuban engineering professor and dissident, best known for his 1997–2000 imprisonment as a member of the pro-democracy "Group of Four".

== The Group of Four ==
In 1997, Bonne, Marta Beatriz Roque, Vladimiro Roca, and René Gómez Manzano founded the Internal Dissidence Working Group. They then published a paper entitled "The Homeland Belongs to All," which discussed Cuba's human rights situation and called for political and economic reforms. They also called for a boycott of elections in Cuba's one-party system and for investors to avoid Cuba, giving several news conferences to discuss their concerns. A The Los Angeles Times columnist described Bonne and Roca's criticism carrying extra weight as "the only known black dissidents in Cuba", stating that "Given Castro's claim that the revolution has ended racial discrimination, he can ill afford to let well-educated blacks challenge him, even as gently as the four defendants had done."

Bonne and the other members of the group were arrested and detained for nineteenth months. They were then tried for sedition in March 1999 in a one-day trial closed to foreign press. Gomez Manzano was sentenced to four years of imprisonment. The defendants became known as the "Group of Four". The United States, EU, Canada, and the Vatican all called for their release. Amnesty International again declared the four prisoners of conscience, "detained solely for peacefully exercising their rights to freedom of expression and association", and called for their immediate release.

Bonne was released early without explanation on 13 May 2000, having served just under three years in prison. Other members of the Group of Four were released shortly thereafter. In November 2000, the four published another essay, entitled "Social Facets", as President Fidel Castro attended a summit in Panama. The essay stated that Cuban education was designed to indoctrinate children, that many children were malnourished from food shortages, and that foreigners in Cuba were allowed privileges—such as cars, computers, and cell phones—that ordinary Cuban people were not.

== Later activism ==
In July 2005, Bonne was detained in another crackdown on dissidents, again, along with Roque and Manzano. On May 20, 2005 Bonne opened his house to The Assembly for the Promotion of Civil Society.

On 11 March 2010, Bonne pledged to go on a hunger strike "to the death" if hunger-striking dissident journalist Guillermo Fariñas died from his own fast.

== Personal life ==
Bonne died of a heart attack on 6 January 2017 at his home in Havana. Bonne was the grandson of Cuban independence fighter Luis Bonne Bonne.
