= Herman Winick =

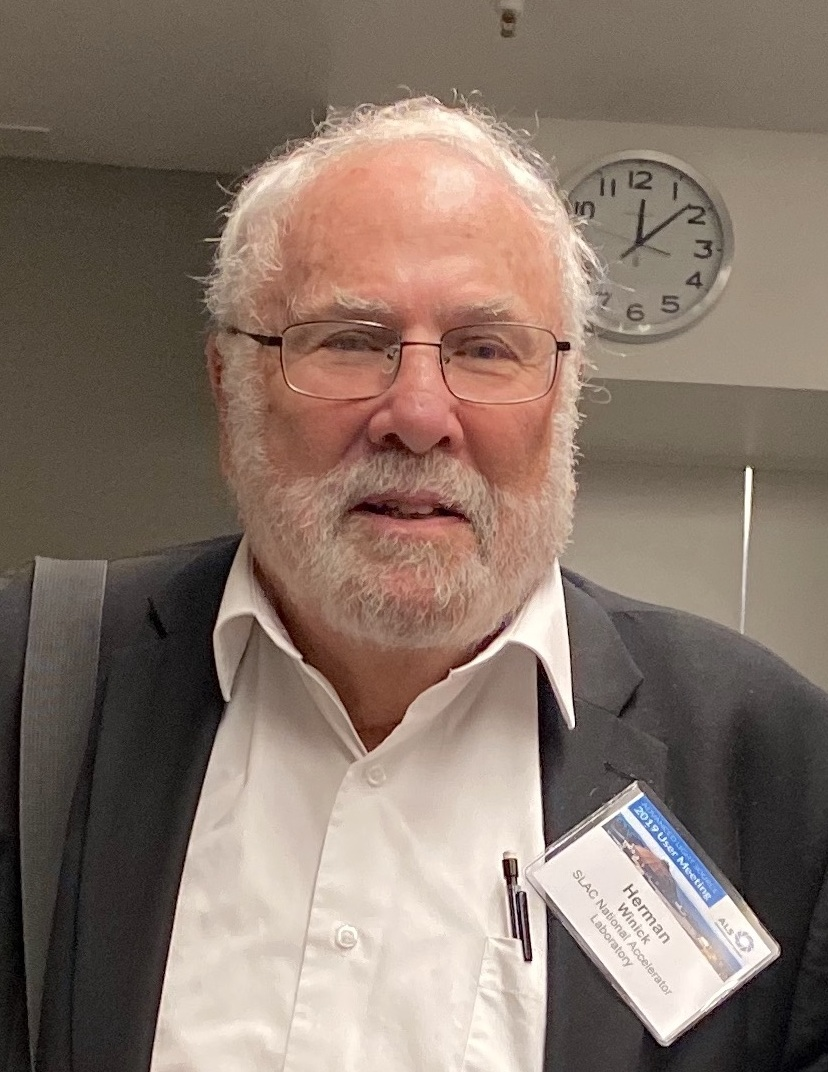
Herman Winick in 2019

Herman Winick (born June 27, 1932) was an American scientist and professor emeritus at the Stanford Linear Accelerator Center (SLAC) and the Applied Physics Department of Stanford University.

== Biography ==
After receiving his AB (1953) and PhD (1957) in physics from Columbia University, he continued work in experimental high energy physics at the University of Rochester (1957–59) and then as a member of the scientific staff and assistant director of the Cambridge Electron Accelerator at Harvard University (1959–73).

Dr. Winick married his childhood sweetheart Renee Winick and is the father of three children; Lee, Lisa and Laura. He is the grandfather of seven, including YouTube celebrity Julien Solomita who is the husband of Jenna Marbles.

== Work ==
He is best known for his leadership role, starting in the mid-1970s, in the development of wiggler and undulator magnet insertion devices as advanced synchrotron radiation sources.

Since retirement he is focusing largely on synchrotron light sources in developing countries such as the International Centre for Synchrotron-Light for Experimental Science Applications in the Middle East (SESAME), work he began in 1998, the African Light Source and the Mexican Light Source.

== Human rights activities ==
His human rights activities started in the 1980s working on behalf of dissidents from the China, Iran, the Soviet Union, and other countries.

== Award ==
In 2005 he received the Heinz R. Pagels Human Rights of Scientists Award from the New York Academy of Sciences.

Winick received the third Andrei Sakharov Prize from the American Physical Society (APS) in 2010 "for tireless and effective personal leadership in defense of human rights of scientists throughout the world".
