= Carmelo Díaz Fernández =

Cuban journalist

Carmelo Díaz Fernández was a Cuban journalist. He was editor of the Cuban Independent Trade Union Press Agency (APSIC), an executive board member of the Unitary Council of Cuban Workers (CUTC), and president of the banned Christian Trade Union.

The communist regime in Cuba imprisoned Fernández during the Black Spring in 2003. He was released in 2004 for health reasons.
