= Ricardo Gonzales =

Ricardo Gonzales may refer to:

- Ricardo Babs Gonzales
- Ricardo Gonzales (boxer), see Boxing at the 1951 Pan American Games

== See also ==
- Ricardo Gonzalez (disambiguation)
