= Laura Pollán =

Cuban dissident (1948–2011)

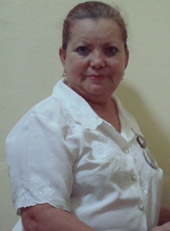
Laura Pollan

Laura Inés Pollán Toledo (February 13, 1948 in Manzanillo, Cuba – October 14, 2011) was a prominent Cuban opposition leader. Pollan founded the dissident group Ladies in White, which holds pacific protest marches with the wives and spouses of political prisoners in Cuba to demand their release.

Pollan worked as a literature teacher until her retirement in 2004. In 2003, her husband, Héctor Maseda Gutiérrez, and seventy-four other Cubans, now known as the Group of 75, were arrested in the Black Spring, a crackdown on opposition figures. The group included journalists, activists, and commentators whom the Cuban government accused of taking money from foreign governments, including the United States.

Pollan soon began appearing outside government facilities where her husband could have potentially been imprisoned. She soon ran into the wives of other political prisoners, which led to the founding of the Ladies in White. Pollan always wore white, a symbol of the organization, and became a key opposition figure in Cuba. Her home at 963 Calle Neptuno in Havana became a center of opposition where she hosted literary tea for wives of political prisoners.

Pollan died of cardiorespiratory arrest on October 14, 2011, at the age of 63. She had been hospitalized since October 7. According to the Cuban government, she had suffered from dengue fever.
