= Committee on Human Rights of Scientists =

Organization centered on human rights for scientists

The Committee on Human Rights of Scientists of the New York Academy of Sciences "was formed in 1978 to pursue the advancement of the basic human rights of scientists throughout the world. The Committee intervenes in cases where scientists, engineers, health professionals and educators are detained, imprisoned, exiled, murdered, "disappeared," or deprived of the rights to pursue science, communicate their findings with their peers and the general public, and travel freely in accordance with established policies of The International Council for Science (ICSU)."

"Throughout its history, the committee has intervened in numerous cases to ameliorate the restricted conditions of individual scientists and to secure for them the protections of the rule of law. Russian physicist Andrei Sakharov and Chinese dissident Fang Lizhi made their first U.S. appearances at the Academy and credited the committee for coordinating the international pressure that led to their releases. The committee marshaled the scientific community on behalf of Wen Ho Lee, the Chinese-American scientist accused of mishandling classified information, and Marta Beatriz Roque Cabello, a Cuban economist jailed for her human rights activities. Other countries where the committee has recently taken action are Belarus, Egypt, Ethiopia, Indonesia, Iran, Israel, Kenya, Palestinian Authority, Sudan, Syria, Turkey, Turkmenistan, Ukraine, and Vietnam."

== The Heinz R. Pagels Human Rights of Scientists Award ==
"This award is given to scientists in recognition of the contributions they made to safeguard or advance the human rights of scientists throughout the world. It was retitled in 1986."

- 2006: Mesfin Woldemariam, Ethiopian geographer and prominent human rights defender, and Joseph Birman, distinguished professor of physics at City College of The City University of New York.
- 2005: Zafra Lerman, distinguished professor of Science and Public Policy and head of the Institute for Science Education and Science Communication at Columbia College Chicago, and Herman Winick, assistant director and professor emeritus of the Stanford Synchrotron Radiation Laboratory at Stanford University
- 2004: Nguyen Dan Que, Medical Doctor, Former Director of Cho-Ray Hospital in Ho Chi Minh, Former Director of Medical Department at Saigon Medical School
- 2003: Saad Eddin Ibrahim, Director of the Ibn Khaldun Center for Development Studies and sociology professor at the American University in Cairo
- 2002: Marta Beatriz Roque Cabello, economist and one of the founders of Internal Dissidents Working Group for Analysis of the Cuban Socio-Economic Situation, and Mohammad Hadi Hadizadeh Yazdi, Professor of nuclear physics, Physics Department School of Science, Ferdowsi University, Mashhad, Iran
- 2001: Alexander Nikitin (Russian Nuclear Engineer, Representative of Bellona Foundation in St. Petersburg) and Betty Tsang (Nuclear Physicist, National Superconducting Cyclotron Laboratory, Michigan State University)
- 2000: Sidney D. Drell, Professor Emeritus, Stanford Linear Accelerator Center, Stanford University, and Lin Hai, Software Engineer, freelance web consultant, webmaster of freechina.com
- 1999: Israel Halperin (Professor Emeritus of Mathematics, University of Toronto, Canada)
- 1998: Boris Altshuler, Physicist, Lebedev Institute; Director, Moscow Research Center for Human Rights, Moscow, Russia, and Morris Pripstein, Physicist, Lawrence Berkeley National Laboratory, Berkeley, California
- 1997: Prof. Laurent Schwartz (Mathematician Emeritus, Universite de Paris and Ecole Polytechnique, Paris and Palaiseaux, France) and Prof. Zuhal Amato (Public Health and Medical Ethics, Dokuz Eyul University, Izmir, Turkey)
- 1996: Prof. Joel Lebowitz, Director, Center for Math Sciences Research, Rutgers University, and Dr. Sergei Kovalev, Biologist, Deputy of the State Duma, Moscow, Russia
- 1995: Prof. Xu Liangying, Physicist and Translator of Albert Einstein's collected works, and Prof. Ding Zilin, Philosopher at Beijing's Chinese People's University
- 1994: Dr. Vil Mirzayanov, Russian Chemist
- 1993: Dr. Abdumannob Pulatov (Physicist, Chairman of the Uzbek Human Rights Committee)
- 1992: Mr. A. M. Rosenthal (Columnist and former Chief Editor of The New York Times)
- 1990: Prof. Inga Fisher-Hjalmars (Chemist and Physicist, former Vice President of the Swedish Academy of Sciences)
- 1989: Prof. Henri Cartan, Mathematician, Professor at ENS, Paris, France
- 1988: Prof. Fang Li-Zhi (prominent Chinese Physicist and Human Rights Advocate)
- 1987: Mrs. Dorothy Hirsch (executive director of the Committee of Concerned Scientists)
- 1986: Dr. Lipman Bers, Mathematician, Professor at Columbia University
- 1979: Prof. Andrei Sakharov, Physicist - presidential Award for his scientific and human rights work
