= Omar Ruiz Hernández =

Cuban journalist (born 1947)

Omar Moisés Ruiz Hernández (born November 16, 1947) is a Cuban journalist. Amnesty International declared him as an international prisoner of conscience after he was imprisoned in 2003 during a crackdown on dissidents. He worked for dissident press agency Grupo de Trabajo Decoro (Decoro Working Group) before sentenced to 18 years in prison.

He has been vice delegate of the unofficial Partido Solidaridad Democrática (Democratic Solidarity Party) in Villa Clara.

He is an Honorary Member of Swedish PEN Centre.

He is believed to have endured maltreatment such as solitary confinement, being held in punishment cells and harassment. The Inter American Press Association reported in 2007 that he had tuberculosis and a chronic parasitic infection, and weighed only 45 kilograms (about 100 pounds).
