= Héctor Maseda Gutiérrez =

Cuban dissident (1943–2026)

Héctor Fernando Maseda Gutiérrez
- Born: January 18, 1943; Havana, Cuba
- Died: May 30, 2026 (aged 83)
- Occupations: Nuclear engineer, journalist
- Spouse: Laura Inés Pollán Toledo
- Awards: CPJ International Press Freedom Award (2008)

Héctor Fernando Maseda Gutiérrez (18 January 1943 - 30 May 2026) was a Cuban nuclear engineer and a journalist.

The Fidel Castro regime arrested him during the 2003 "Black Spring" and sentenced him to 20 years in jail. He was released in February, 2011. Amnesty International named him a prisoner of conscience and called for his immediate release. In 2008, he won an International Press Freedom Award from the Committee to Protect Journalists. The award is given for journalists who show courage in defending press freedom in the face of attacks, threats or imprisonment.

Finally, I believe this testimony could be assumed as an insistent voice for all those who suffer the horror that characterizes despotic and oligarchic government models. This work will travel, like a galloping knight armed with his sword, morally strengthened or blessed by the truth, to all the latitudes of the planet it can visit and it will act as a public and challenging message to those who control people and countries in any part of the world.

— Héctor Maseda Gutiérrez in his acceptance letter, sent from Aguïca Maximum Security Prison.

He was a nuclear engineer before being sacked at the end of the 1980s for ideological errors.

Héctor Maseda Gutiérrez was married to Laura Inés Pollán Toledo. Pollán Toledo was a founding member of the Ladies in White. She lost her job as a high school Spanish teacher in 2003. Laura Inés Pollán Toledo died on October 14, 2011.

In prison, Héctor Maseda Gutiérrez managed to write his memoirs, Enterrados Vivos (English: Buried Alive), which was smuggled out one page at time. His wife sent a copy to Fidel Castro. Upon his release in February, Maseda claimed that he was "released against his will," as he refused to leave jail unless he was exonerated or pardoned, along with the rest of the Black Spring prisoners.

He died on May 30, 2026.
