= Jorge Olivera Castillo =

Cuban poet and dissident

- Born: 1961 (age 64–65); Havanna, Cuba
- Occupations: Activist, poet, writer
- Writing career
- Language: Spanish
- Years active: 1994-present
- Genre: poetry

Jorge Olivera Castillo (b. Havana, Cuba, 1961) is a Cuban poet and dissident.

He worked as a journalist for the Cuban state-run television station ICRT for 10 years. He was briefly detained in 1992 for trying to leave the country on a raft; in 1993, he left his position at ICRT and began writing reports for Radio Martí, a U.S.-funded, Miami-based station critical of the Cuban government. With two other journalists, he founded an independent news agency, Havana Press, in 1995, and later became the director.

Olivera Castillo was arrested in 2003 as part of the Black Spring crackdown and sentenced to eighteen years in prison for writing articles "against national independence and Cuba's economy". In prison, he spent nine months in solitary confinement, and suffered from a range of health problems. He began writing poetry and fiction while in prison as a coping mechanism. His wife, Nancy Alfaya, became a member of the Ladies in White, agitating for his release. After international pressure, he was released for health reasons after serving only 18 months of his sentence, but remained under close supervision. He is currently a visiting scholar at Harvard University.

== Works ==
=== Poetry ===
- Confesiones antes del crepúsculo. Miami: Ed. Proyecto de Bibliotecas Independientes, 2005.
- En cuerpo y alma. Ed. Olgy and Olega Krylovových. Prague: PEN Czech Republic, 2008. (Spanish and Czech)

—, 2010. (Spanish and French)

- Sobrevivir en la boca del lobo. Madrid: Editorial Hispano Cubana, 2012. ISBN 9788493742379.
- Cenizas alumbradas. Warsaw: Lech Walesa Foundation, 2010. (Spanish and Polish)
- Tatuajes en la memoria. Prague, 2013.
- Quemar las naves. [Miami]: Neo Club Ediciones, 2015. ISBN 9781519200570.

=== Short stories ===
- Huésped del infierno. Valencia: Editorial Aduana Vieja, 2007. ISBN 978-84-935219-8-1.
- Antes que amanezca : y otros relatos. Buenos Aires: Fundación Cadal, 2010. ISBN 9789872344627.
