= Marta Beatriz Roque =

Cuban political dissident (born 1945)

Marta Beatriz Roque Cabello
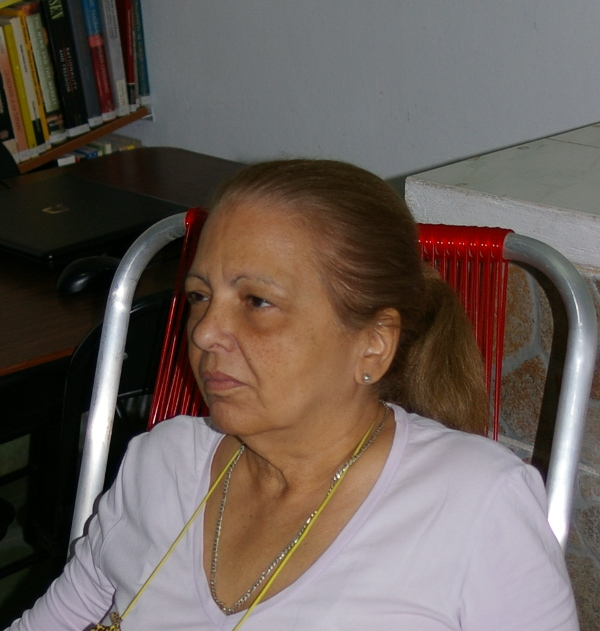
- Born: 16 May 1945 (age 80)
- Occupation: economist
- Organization: Assembly to Promote Civil Society in Cuba
- Known for: dissident politics, imprisonment
- Awards: Heinz R. Pagels Human Rights of Scientists Award (2002)

Marta Beatriz Roque Cabello (born 16 May 1945) is a Cuban political dissident. She is an economist by training and the founder and director of the Cuban Institute of Independent Economists. Agence France-Presse described her in 2007 as Cuba's "leading woman dissident".

== The Group of Four ==
In 1997, Roque, Vladimiro Roca, Felix Bonne and Rene Gomez Manzano published a paper titled "The Homeland Belongs to All," which discussed Cuba's human rights situation and called for political and economic reforms. They also called for a boycott of elections in Cuba's one-party system and for investors to avoid Cuba, giving several news conferences to discuss their concerns.

The four were detained without trial for nineteen months. In May 1998, Roque smuggled a letter out of the prison written on toilet paper, telling foreign journalists that the four were suffering from poor medical care and political indoctrination. The four were then tried for sedition in March 1999 in a one-day trial closed to foreign press. The defendants became known as the "Group of Four". Roque was sentenced to three-and-a-half years' imprisonment, but won the right to appeal her case after staging a hunger strike in June 1999. The US, EU, Canada, and the Vatican all called for her release. Ultimately, she served all but a few months of her sentence and was released in May 2002.

Other members of the Group of Four were released around the same time. In November 2000, the four published another essay, titled "Social Facets", as President Fidel Castro attended a summit in Panama. The essay stated that Cuban education was designed to indoctrinate children, that many children were malnourished from food shortages, and that foreigners in Cuba were allowed privileges such as cars, computers, and cell phones that ordinary Cuban people were not.

== Later activism ==
In March 2003, she and other dissidents lobbied the EU not to sign a trade agreement with Cuba until its human rights record improved. She also began a hunger strike calling for the release of political prisoners.

She was arrested the same month along with 74 other dissidents in what some have called the "Black Spring" crackdown. On 3 April 2003, Roque was brought to trial and convicted in a one-day trial. PEN International reported that she and the other defendants were given insufficient time to prepare a case. Roque was sentenced to 20 years in prison for "acts against the independence or territorial integrity of the state". Amnesty International adopted her as a prisoner of conscience, and Roque's sister Isabel was invited to meet with U.S. President George W. Bush in Washington, D.C. to discuss the case.

Reports stated that Roque lost 30 pounds (14 kg) while imprisoned from vomiting and diarrhea and was hospitalized in July 2003. On 22 July 2004, Roque was given early release from prison due to her declining health.

In 2005, Roque founded the Assembly to Promote Civil Society in Cuba (Asamblea para Promover la Sociedad Civil en Cuba), serving as the organization's director. Varela Project organizer Oswaldo Payá feuded with Roque over the group's formation, accusing her of collaborating with security forces to justify a further crackdown. Wayne Smith, a former chief of the US Interests Section in Havana, criticized her group as seeming "virtually to operate out of the U.S. Interests Section", arguing that this weakened her credibility with Cubans.

She was detained again on 27 September 2007 when she was forced onto a bus during a rally at Cuba's Justice Ministry building. Police reportedly informed her that they were protecting her from "the wrath of the people".

Roque refuses to leave Cuba, stating, "We need enough space in our society and we are working for this. We need to make a hole inside the government to live, to think, to talk ... We need to be here. Me in particular. I don't want to live out of my country. This is my country and my country needs what we do."

In 2012, she participated in a hunger strike in support of human rights in Cuba. The official Cuban media denied her participation by showing a video in which she accepted food from a neighbor. The Government used the video to demonstrate the dissidents' lack of credibility on the Island.

She maintains a profound difference with dissident Rosa María Paya Acevedo, daughter of former dissident Oswaldo Paya, accusing her of making a profit with her father's memory and carrying out activism abroad, thus protected from the repressions of the Cuban Government.

== Prizes ==
She is a recipient of the 2002 Heinz R. Pagels Human Rights of Scientists Award of the New York Academy of Sciences and an honorary member of the Canadian, English, and Finnish PEN.

She is a recipient of the 2024 International Women of Courage Award.
