= Fidel Suárez Cruz =

Cuban farmer from Pinar del Río

Fidel Suárez Cruz is a Cuban farmer from Pinar del Río.

He became an independent librarian and a member of the pro-democracy Party for Human Rights in Cuba. He was arrested during the 2003 crackdown on dissidents and summarily sentenced to jail. Amnesty International recognized him as a prisoner of conscience.

== See also ==
- Cuban democracy movement
