= Luis Milán Fernández =

Cuban physician from Santiago de Cuba (born 1970)

- Born: February 21, 1970 (age 56); Santiago de Cuba, Cuba
- Occupation: Physician
- Known for: imprisonment in Black Spring
- Spouse: Lisandra Lafitta Hernández

Luis Milán Fernández (born 21 February 1970) is a Cuban physician from Santiago de Cuba. In 2001, he and his wife, a dentist named Lisandra Lafitta Hernández, signed "Manifiesto 2001", which called for basic freedoms to be respected in Cuba.

He was one of 75 dissidents arrested in 2003 as part of the crackdown known as the Black Spring. He was sentenced to thirteen years in prison, and Amnesty International recognized him as prisoner of conscience.

In 2005, Milán was transferred to a psychiatric ward despite having no reported psychological problems. According to Lafitta, he was confined with two or three mental patients, one of whom cut his own ear off during their confinement. In June 2007, the Internet news agency BosNewsLife reported that Milán's health was deteriorating as a result of his confinement.

In July 2010, tripartite negotiations between Cuban President Raúl Castro, Roman Catholic bishop Jaime Ortega, and Spanish Foreign Minister Miguel Angel Moratinos resulted in pardons being granted to the remaining 52 Black Spring prisoners on the condition that they go into exile in Spain. Milán was released from prison the following week, and he and his family departed for Spain. They resettled in Málaga, where Milán said that he would try to continue working as a physician.
