= Antonio Díaz Gil =

Spanish footballer

Liz II
Personal information
- Full name: Antonio Díaz Gil
- Date of birth: 10 May 1934
- Place of birth: Seville, Spain
- Date of death: 5 April 2014 (aged 79)
- Place of death: Seville, Spain
- Position: Forward

Youth career
- Sevilla

Senior career*
| Years | Team | Apps | (Gls) |
| 1953–1954 | Coria | | |
| 1954–1955 | Granada | 14 | (1) |
| 1955–1958 | Sevilla | 3 | (1) |
| 1956–1957 | → Cádiz (loan) | 18 | (9) |
| 1957–1958 | → Cádiz (loan) | 18 | (5) |
| 1959–1960 | Celta | 5 | (1) |
| 1960–1961 | Xerez | | |
| Total | | 58 | (17) |
- * Club domestic league appearances and goals

Antonio Díaz Gil (10 May 1934 – 5 April 2014), commonly known as Liz II, was a Spanish footballer who played as a forward.

== Club career ==
Born in Seville, Liz II played only for clubs in his native Andalusia, the sole exception being RC Celta de Vigo. He also represented, in an eight-year professional career, Coria CF, Granada CF, Sevilla FC, Cádiz CF and Xerez CD. With Sevilla, where he coincided with legendary manager Helenio Herrera, he scored his only goal in La Liga, in a 3–0 home win against Deportivo Alavés on 13 November 1955.

Liz II died in his hometown on 5 April 2014, one month shy of his 80th birthday.

== Personal life ==
Antonio's older brother, Manuel, was also a footballer and a forward. He too represented Sevilla.
