= Diosdado González Marrero =

Cuban dissident

Diosdado González Marrero is a Cuban dissident.

Diosdado was a member of the Peace, Democracy and Liberty Party. He was imprisoned during the Black Spring crackdown on dissidents in 2003, and named a prisoner of conscience by Amnesty International.

González Marrero's wife Alejandrina García de la Riva reports that she been harassed:
