= Ricardo Enrique Silva =

Cuban doctor and dissident

Ricardo Enrique Silva is a Cuban doctor and dissident who was imprisoned during the Black Spring in 2003.

Physicians for Human Rights reports that he has eye problems.
