= Ricardo Silva (footballer, born 1980) =

Portuguese footballer

Personal information
- Full name: Ricardo Nuno Pinto Pinheiro da Silva
- Date of birth: 12 May 1980 (age 46)
- Place of birth: Porto, Portugal
- Height: 1.85 m (6 ft 1 in)
- Position: Goalkeeper

Team information
- Current team: Wolverhampton Wanderers (goalkeeper coach)

Youth career
- 1990–1994: Porto
- 1994–1995: Vilanovense
- 1995–1996: Oliveira do Bairro
- 1996–1997: Oliveira Douro
- 1997–1999: Ermesinde

Senior career*
Years	Team	Apps	(Gls)
1999–2000	Ermesinde		
2000–2003	Porto B		
2003–2004	Lixa		
2004–2005	Desportivo das Aves	1	(0)
2005–2006	Marco	2	(0)
2006–2007	Tourizense		
2007–2008	Vila Meã		
2008–2009	Amarante		
2009–2010	Cinfães		
2010–2012	Fafe	30	(0)
2012–2013	Arouca	1	(0)
2013–2014	Moreirense	2	(0)
2014–2016	Varzim	27	(0)
2016–2017	Sanjoanense	26	(0)
- * Club domestic league appearances and goals

Ricardo Nuno Pinto Pinheiro da Silva (born 12 May 1980) is a Portuguese football coach and former player, who is the goalkeeper coach of EFL Championship club Wolverhampton Wanderers.

== Career ==
Silva made his professional debut in the Segunda Liga for Desportivo das Aves on 30 April 2005 in a game against Leixões.
