= Manuel Vázquez Portal =

Cuban poet, writer and journalist (born 1951)

- Born: 1951 (age 74–75); Morón, Ciego de Ávila province, Cuba
- Education: Villa Clara University
- Occupation: journalist
- Known for: 2003 imprisonment
- Spouse: Yolanda Huerga
- Awards: CPJ International Press Freedom Award (2003)

Manuel Vázquez Portal (born 1951 in Morón, Ciego de Ávila Province) is a Cuban poet, writer and journalist known for his 2003 imprisonment.

== Background ==
Vázquez Portal received a degree in philology from Villa Clara University. Prior to his imprisonment, he worked a variety of jobs, including teaching high school, reporting for state-owned media, and advising at the Ministry of Culture. During his tenure with government media, Vázquez Portal received three official prizes, but in 1995, he was expelled by the National Union of Writers and Artists of Cuba (UNEAC) for expressing dissident opinions. In the same year, he co-founded the independent Cuba Press. He founded another independent news agency, Grupo de Trabajo Decoro, in 1998, working there for the following five years. Among his articles were various criticisms of the national economy and electoral system.

Vázquez Portal is married to Yolanda Huerga, with whom he has a son, Gabriel.

== Incarceration ==
In March 2003, the Cuban government launched a general crackdown (later called the "Black Spring") on dissidents, including a number of journalists. Seventy-five people were ultimately arrested, including Vázquez Portal. On 4 April 2004, he was sentenced to 18 years in prison for "endangering Cuba's independence" through his articles and his meetings with US officials.

Vázquez Portal's imprisonment was condemned by several human rights organizations, including Amnesty International, which designated him a prisoner of conscience, and Reporters Without Borders. In late 2003, the Committee to Protect Journalists awarded him its International Press Freedom Award, which recognizes journalists who show courage in defending press freedom despite facing attacks, threats, or imprisonment. Vázquez Portal was unable to attend the ceremony due to his imprisonment.

During his incarceration, Vázquez Portal kept a makeshift diary on sheets of blank paper brought by his family. In June 2003, his wife Huerga smuggled the diary from the prison and shared photocopies with the Associated Press. The diary told of poor conditions, including miserable food, constant mosquitoes and flies, and rat infestations in the cells. Huerga also helped found the Ladies in White, a protest group composed of the wives of imprisoned dissidents.

In August 2003, Vázquez Portal reportedly joined several other prisoners in a hunger strike, following which the group was split up and transferred to different prisons. He began to suffer from pulmonary emphysema and was released for medical reasons in June 2004. He subsequently emigrated to the US with his family, settling in Miami, Florida, where Huerga continued to be active in anti-Castro protests.
