= Antonio Fernando =

Spanish footballer

Personal information
- Full name: Antonio Fernando Díaz Bizcocho
- Date of birth: 3 August 1970 (age 56)
- Place of birth: Coria del Río, Spain
- Height: 1.77 m (5 ft 9 1/2 in)
- Position: Right back

Youth career
- Coria
- 1987–1989: Betis

Senior career*
| Years | Team | Apps | (Gls) |
| 1988–1990 | Betis B | 15 | (0) |
| 1990–1992 | Betis | 24 | (2) |
| 1992–1993 | Écija | 26 | (1) |
| 1993–1994 | Recreativo | 26 | (0) |
| 1994–1995 | Almería | 13 | (1) |
| 1995–1996 | Yeclano | 26 | (0) |
| 1996–1997 | Marbella | 17 | (1) |
| 1997–1998 | Isla Cristina | 31 | (1) |
| 1998–2002 | Gimnástica | 104 | (1) |
| Total | | 282 | (7) |

International career
| 1987 | Spain U16 | 5 | (0) |
| 1988 | Spain U18 | 3 | (0) |
| 1991 | Spain U23 | 2 | (0) |
- * Club domestic league appearances and goals

Antonio Fernando Díaz Bizcocho (born 3 August 1970 in Coria del Río, Andalusia), known as Antonio Fernando, is a Spanish former footballer who played as a right back.
