= Ricardo González Alfonso =

Cuban journalist

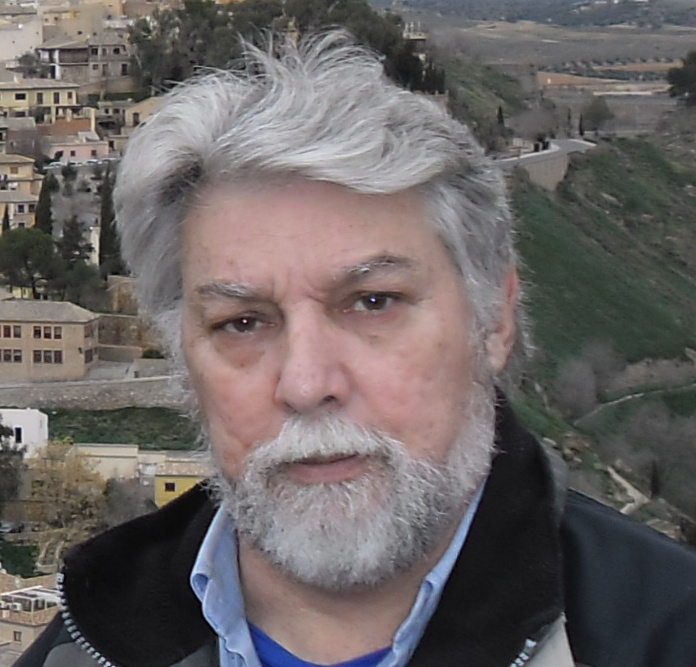
- Ricardo González Alfonso
- Born: 1950 (age 75–76)
- Occupation: journalist
- Known for: 2003-2010 imprisonment
- Awards: Reporter of the Year 2008

Ricardo González Alfonso (born 1950) is a Cuban journalist. He was arrested in March 2003, and sentenced to 20 years in jail. Reporters Without Borders named González its Reporter of the Year in 2008.

== Background ==
Ricardo González Alfonso was born in 1950. By 1995, González had begun working for Cuba Press, an independent news agency, and by 1998 had become a correspondent for Reporters Without Borders. He also published stories on everyday life in Cuba for foreign outlets.

In addition to his journalism, González published a volume of poetry, Hombres sin Rostros (Men Without Faces). and worked as a scriptwriter for the state television station Televisión Cubana.

== Imprisonment ==
In 2003, González was arrested at his home on the first day of the national press crackdown that would later be called the Black Spring. Cuban authorities accused him of being "in the pay of the United States" and "undermining Cuba's independence and territorial integrity", and he received a twenty-year prison term. Amnesty International named him a prisoner of conscience and called for his immediate release.

In 2009, he was reported to be in deteriorating health while held in an isolation cell.

In a deal brokered between the Government of Cuba and the Roman Catholic Church, González and 51 other "Black Spring" political prisoners and their families were released and sent to Spain. González and 6 other released prisoners arrived in Spain on July 13, 2010. Upon his arrival in Spain, González said "This is a continuation of the fight".

== Awards ==
González Alfonso founded the newsmagazine De Cuba, which received a special citation from the Maria Moors Cabot prize of the Columbia University Graduate School of Journalism for "outstanding reporting on Latin America".

In 2008, Reporters Without Borders named González "Reporter of the Year" for 2008, citing him "for helping an independent press to survive in Cuba". Although in prison, González was able to send a message to his wife, journalist Alida de Jesús Viso Bello. The message was read at the award ceremony by Alejandro Gonzalez, a friend and colleague of González Alfonso. González Alfonso dedicated the award to 22 reporters jailed in Cuba.
