= Luis Fernández (footballer, born 1989) =

Paraguayan footballer

Personal information
- Full name: Luis Ignacio Fernández Villalba
- Date of birth: 1 May 1989 (age 37)
- Place of birth: Asunción, Paraguay
- Height: 1.85 m (6 ft 1 in)
- Position: Midfielder

Team information
- Current team: Patriotas

Senior career*
Years	Team	Apps	(Gls)
2012–2013	Atlético Colegiales		
2013–2014	Magallanes	41	(5)
2014–2015	Lota Schwager	23	(5)
2015–2016	Santiago Morning	15	(3)
2016	Sportivo Luqueño	4	(0)
2018	2 de Mayo	26	(8)
2019–2020	Deportivo Capiatá	1	(0)
2022	General Caballero JLM	17	(0)
2022	12 de Octubre	10	(1)
2023	Atyrá	20	(2)
2024	Independiente FBC	10	(1)
2024–	Patriotas	–	(–)
- * Club domestic league appearances and goals as of 9 November 2024

Luis Ignacio Fernández Villalba (born 1 May 1989 in Paraguay) is a Paraguayan footballer who plays as a midfielder for Patriotas.

== Career ==
Fernández came to Chile in 2013 from Atlético Colegiales. In that country, he played until 2016 for Magallanes, Lota Schwager and Santiago Morning.

In 2024, Fernández joined Independiente FBC. In the second half of the same year, he switched to Patriotas in the Primera B Nacional.
