= Jestina Mukoko =

Zimbabwean human rights activist

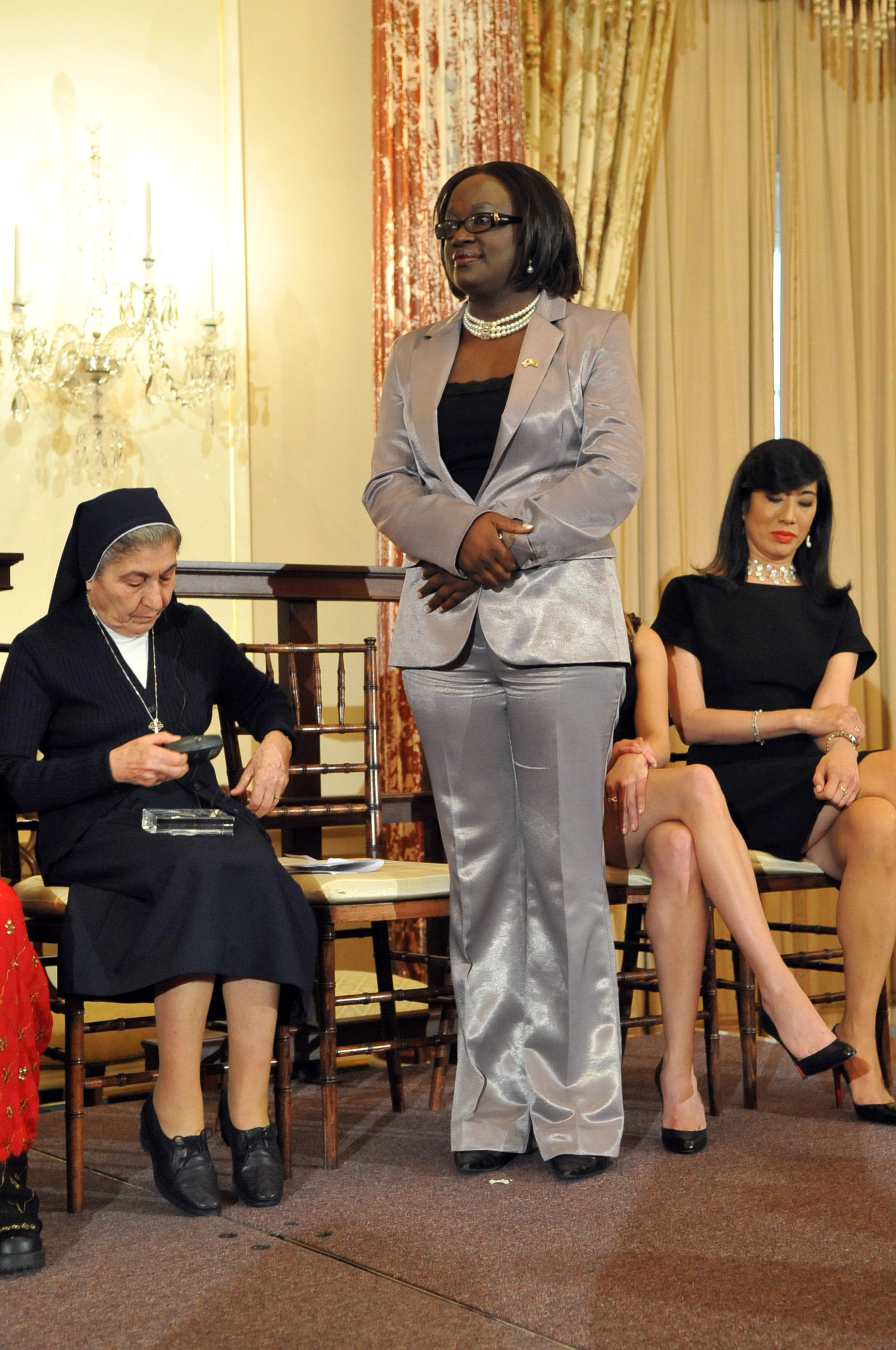
Jestina Mukoko is recognized at the International Women of Courage Award ceremony, 10 March 2010.

Jestina Mukoko is a Zimbabwean human rights activist and the director of the Zimbabwe Peace Project. She is a journalist by training and a former newsreader with the Zimbabwe Broadcasting Corporation.

In March 2010, Mukoko was one of ten human rights defenders honoured in the U.S. State Department's International Women of Courage Awards to women who have shown exceptional courage and leadership in advancing women's rights. She was also selected and served as the 2010 fellow with the Oak Institute for the Study of International Human Rights at Colby College.

== Abduction and detention ==
On 3 December 2008, Mukoko was abducted during the night from her home north of Harare. Dumisani Muleya of Business Day reported that she had been "abducted by suspected state agents for allegedly being involved in plans for anti government demonstrations."

She subsequently told The Independent newspaper that she was taken away for interrogation about her NGO, the Peace Project, then accused of recruiting youths for military training with the opposition Movement for Democratic Change. She was beaten on the soles of her feet with rubber truncheons (allegedly a favourite torture instrument of the regime in Zimbabwe because they leave no marks likely to be visible at later court appearances).

After three days, she was handed over to another group of interrogators who claimed they were "law and order" officials. She was threatened with "extinction" if she chose not to be a witness to the alleged cases of military training.

Prominent world figures including Gordon Brown and Condoleezza Rice demanded her release. The so-called "Group of Elders", including Jimmy Carter, Kofi Annan and Graça Machel, who at the time were being refused admission to Zimbabwe, made an appeal for Mukoko's release at a news conference in South Africa.

The Zimbabwe High Court ordered the Zimbabwe Republic Police to look for Mukoko. The order was ignored by the police who denied knowledge of her whereabouts.

Meanwhile, Mukoko had been forced to kneel on gravel for hours while being interrogated in an attempt to force her to sign a statement that she had recruited an ex-policeman to the supposed plot. Her medical condition deteriorated and she was eventually given medicine to treat serious allergies. She was forced to read statements to camera and pressured to admit links to the former policeman Fidelis Mudimu. She overheard someone say they were at the King George VI Barracks outside Harare.

She was eventually told that she and another abductee, her colleague, Broderick Takawera, were in police custody. She was moved around between different police stations and forced to accompany police on searches of her home and office.

On 24 December, the state-run Herald newspaper reported that Mukoko had appeared in court in Harare on charges of attempting to recruit people for military training to try to overthrow the government. She had not been able to consult with lawyers. She appeared in court with seven other abductees, including a 72-year-old man and a two-year-old boy whose father and mother, Violet Mupfuranhehwe and Collen Mutemagawo, were also in detention.

In March 2009, three months after her abduction, Mukoko was released on bail. Her bail conditions required her to report to her local police station in Norton on a weekly basis and surrender her passport.

On 21 September 2009, the Zimbabwe Supreme Court ordered a permanent stay of criminal proceedings against Mukoko. Amnesty International welcomed the decision, commenting that the charges were widely believed to have been trumped up by the Mugabe government as part of a wider strategy to silence perceived political opponents. Under the umbrella of the German parliaments’ godparenthood program for human rights activists, German politician Marina Schuster has been raising awareness for Mukoko's work.
