= Jorge Luis González Tanquero =

Cuban dissident

- Born: c. 1970
- Died: 27 November 2016 (aged 46); Miami, Florida, U.S.

Jorge Luis González Tanquero (c. 1970 – 27 November 2016) was a Cuban dissident. He was declared a prisoner of conscience by Amnesty International.

When his family defected to the United States, then-President of the United States George W. Bush noted "They recently arrived from Cuba, but without Melissa's father. Jorge Luis Gonzalez Tanquero dared to defend the human rights of his countrymen. For that, he was arrested for crimes against the state. He languished in poor health inside a Cuban prison".
