= Omar Rodríguez Saludes =

Cuban journalist

Omar Rodriguez Saludes is a well known Cuban dissent journalist. He was sentenced to 27 years in jail.

According to his wife, his cell conditions are very bad. There is no light in his cell and he has to suffer from mosquitoes.

His sentence was changed to exile to Spain in 2010.
