= Antônio de Jesus Dias =

Brazilian politician (1942–2020)

Member of the Chamber of Deputies from Goiás
- In office 1987–1995

Member of the Legislative Assembly of Goiás
- In office 1980–1981

Personal details
- Born: 28 January 1942 Anápolis, Goiás, Brazil
- Died: 3 September 2020 (aged 78) Goiânia, Goiás, Brazil
- Party: Brazilian Democratic Movement (PMDB)
- Other political affiliations: PDS (former); ARENA (former)
- Education: Pontifical Catholic University of Goiás
- Profession: Politician, Psychologist

Antônio de Jesus Dias (28 January 1942 – 3 September 2020) was a Brazilian pastor and politician who served as a Deputy. He died from COVID-19 during the COVID-19 pandemic in Brazil.
