= António Dias Cardoso =

Angolan politician (born 1933)

- Born: 1933; Luanda, Angola
- Died: 24 June 2006 (aged 72–73); Lisbon, Portugal
- Political party: MPLA (after 1975); Democratic Movement of Angola (before 1975)

António Dias Cardoso (1933 – 24 June 2006) served as the president of the Democratic Movement of Angola until he joined the MPLA in 1975.

Cardoso was born in Luanda. He became a student activist after World War II. He was arrested in 1959 and 1961 by the Portuguese Secret Police and exiled to the Tarrafal de Santiago prison in Cape Verde. He died of prostate cancer in Lisbon, Portugal. After his release in 1974, he returned to Angola where he wrote many books about his time in prison during the colonial era. He worked as the editor of the Progresso newspaper of the MPLA after independence. He is the author of many books and poetry, including Poemas de Circunstancia (1961), Panfleto (1979), Poemas da Cadeia (1979), and Economia Politica (1979).
