= Zimbabwe Peace Project =

Zimbabwe Peace Project also known as ZPP is a human rights monitoring group in Zimbabwe. The ZPP was established in 2000 by a group of civilians and church members. It is critical of the human rights situation in Zimbabwe, and its Director Jestina Mukoko was abducted by secret Police and freed only after Zimbabwe High Court orders. It is a non-registered organization and has faced many obstacles because the government suspected that they are creating violence among the society. ZPP alleged that human rights lawyer Beatrice Mtetwa had been kidnapped. ZPP was involved in documenting human rights abuses by the Zimbabwe government. Other activists have also been abducted by the Secret Police.
