= Adolfo Fernández Sainz =

Cuban journalist

Juan Adolfo Fernández Saínz (born in 1947) is a Cuban journalist. Before his imprisonment, he was an independent journalist with the Patria news agency. Adolfo Fernández Sainz also contributed to foreign publications, particularly in Sweden. He was correspondent of the Russian human rights news agency Prima since 2001.

Adolfo Fernández Sainz was arrested and sentenced to 15 years in prison during the Black Spring crackdown on dissidents in 2003. In prison, he has protested through hunger strikes. A 2003 hunger strike demanded decent food and medicine for seriously ill prisoners. Amnesty International has recognized him as a prisoner of conscience.

The Freedom for Fernandez International Committee has demanded Adolfo Fernández Sainz to be released.

Adolfo Fernández Sainz was the prisoner of the month of the English PEN in March 2006.

Fernández Sainz was released from prison on 19 August 2010. The next day, he traveled to Spain to live there. His release from prison was based on direct negotiation between deputies of the Catholic Church and the Spanish government.
