= Mijail Bárzaga =

Cuban dissident

Mijail Bárzaga Lugo
- Occupation: journalist
- Known for: 2003–2010 imprisonment

Mijail Bárzaga Lugo (his name being the Spanish rendering of the Russian name Михаил, usually spelled Mikhail in English) is a Cuban dissident who worked as a freelance journalist in Havana and was incarcerated in Cuba for seven years as a prisoner of conscience recognized by Amnesty International.

In 2003, during the Black Spring crackdown on dissidents, the regime accused Mijail Bárzaga of publishing subversive and counter-revolutionary news on Internet sites such as Cubanet, Cubaliberal and Payolibre. He was sentenced to 15 years in jail for his journalism. He was released from prison in July 2010 and immediately exiled to Spain together with his family.
