= Christian Liberation Movement =

Christian Liberation Movement Movimiento Cristiano Liberación
- Leader: Eduardo Cardet
- Secretary-General: Antonio Díaz
- Spokesperson: Regis Iglesias
- Founder: Oswaldo Payá
- Founded: 8 September 1988
- Headquarters: Velasco, Holguín, Cuba
- Think tank: Varela Project
- Ideology: Christian democracy Anti-communism
- Political position: Centre-right
- International affiliation: Centrist Democrat International
- Regional affiliation: Christian Democrat Organization of America
- Colors: Blue; Red

Website
- mcliberacion.org

The Christian Liberation Movement (Spanish: Movimiento Cristiano Liberación, MCL) is a Cuban centre-right political organization established in 1988. The movement advocates peaceful democratic reform, civic participation, and respect for human rights in Cuba. It has been led by Eduardo Cardet since 2014.

The MCL promotes political pluralism, national reconciliation, and a transition toward democratic governance through non-violent civic action. Although inspired by Catholic social teaching, the organization states that it is non-denominational and open to both religious and non-religious supporters who share its principles.

== History ==
The Christian Liberation Movement was founded on 8 September 1988 in Havana by a group of five lay Catholic activists from Cerro: Oswaldo Payá, Ramón Antúnez, Dagoberto Capote Mesa, Fernando Avedo, and Santiago Cárdenas. The organization emerged during the Special Period of economic and political stagnation in Cuba, and sought to promote peaceful civic engagement within the existing legal framework.

From its founding until his death in 2012, the movement was led by Payá, who became one of Cuba’s most prominent dissident figures. Under his leadership, the MCL expanded its network across the country and gained international attention for advocating democratic reforms through legal and non-violent initiatives. In December 2007, the MLC proposed a draft bill to the National Assembly of People's Power to guarantee the effective respect of constitutional and human rights, but the project was not considered.

Following Payá’s death in a car crash in July 2012, which the organization has repeatedly described as an assassination carried out by Cuban authorities, the movement underwent a leadership transition. On 19 November 2014, Eduardo Cardet was elected National Coordinator, succeeding Payá.

On 30 November 2016, five days after the death of Fidel Castro, Cardet was detained and later sentenced to three years in prison on charges of attack on authority, contempt, and "offense against the Commander." The charges were related to statements in which he criticized the official mourning period following Castro’s death, which authorities alleged insulted Castro’s memory. He was released on probation in May 2019. Following his release, he stated from his home that he considered the sentence "unjust and arbitrary" and indicated that it was scheduled to end on 30 September of that year.

During the 2021 Cuban protests, the MCL expressed support for the demonstrations and condemned their suppression. The organization announced a solidarity campaign advocating for two ultimate objectives: the unconditional release of political prisoners and prisoners of conscience, and the organization of free, pluralistic, and fair elections in Cuba. On 16 October 2022, the MCL stated that State Security agents had threatened to prosecute Eduardo Cardet following his arrest on 16 October following a protest in Velasco, Holguín. According to the organization, the alleged threat was conveyed through a document that Cardet refused to sign, stating that he considered it illegal.

== Political position ==
The Christian Liberation Movement bases its political philosophy on principles derived from Christian social doctrine and the ethical teachings of the Gospel, emphasizing human dignity, solidarity, and social justice. The organization describes itself as a civic and democratic movement committed to nonviolence and peaceful political change, advocating reforms led by Cuban citizens through civic participation and democratic processes. It identifies with a Christian democratic perspective that promotes social justice, the role of the family, and national traditions. Its program emphasizes national reconciliation through dialogue among Cubans and legal reforms aimed at expanding citizen participation and strengthening constitutional guarantees, including freedom of movement and property rights.

The MCL has urged the governments, parliaments, citizens of the European Union to support:

"in a public and sustained manner the release of those jailed in Cuba for defending, promoting and exercising peacefully their human rights; the dialogue between Cubans as a path toward achieving the changes the Cuban people desire and national reconciliation; and our demands for changes in the laws so that the civil, political, economic, social and cultural rights of all Cubans are respected".

The Christian Liberation Movement is a member of the Centrist Democrat International, the international organization promoting Christian democracy.

== See also ==
- Varela Project
- Christian democracy
