= Varela Project =

Cuban democratic reform project

The Varela Project (Spanish: Proyecto Varela) is a project that was started in 1998 by Oswaldo Payá of the Christian Liberation Movement (MCL) and named after Felix Varela, a Cuban Patriot Priest named the Father of The Homeland.

Many members were imprisoned during the Black Spring in 2003.

== The Varela Project citizens' initiative ==
The purpose of the Varela Project was to circulate a proposal of law advocating for democratic political reforms within Cuba, such as the establishment of freedom of association, freedom of speech, freedom of the press, free elections, freedom of religion, freedom to start private businesses, and amnesty for political prisoners.

About 11,000 Cubans signed the reformist Varela Project citizens' initiative. The US State Department's 2005 report on Cuba in Country Reports on Human Rights Practices (issued in 2006) stated that "activists reported increased harassment by State Security agents. Authorities arrested and detained Varela activists, confiscated signatures, fined and threatened activists and signers, and forced signers to rescind signatures. State Security impersonated canvassing volunteers and increasingly infiltrated the ranks of activists. In May and June, Oswaldo Paya reported State Security agents visited and pressured more than 50 Varela Project signatories to retract their signatures and denounce the Varela Project activists who had collected their signatures." The US State Department's 2004 report on Cuba referred to the Cuban Penal Code concept of "dangerousness," defined as the "special proclivity of a person to commit crimes, demonstrated by his conduct in manifest contradiction of socialist norms." The report said that "If the police decide that a person exhibits signs of dangerousness, they may bring the offender before a court or subject him to therapy or political reeducation". According to the Inter-American Commission on Human Rights, this provision "amounted to a subjective criterion used by the Government to justify violations of individual freedoms and due process for persons whose sole crime was to hold a view different from the official view".

The Cuban government refused to consider the petition, and the Cuban National Assembly's Constitution and Legal Affairs Committee suspended its consideration, and responded to the Varela Project with a "counter-initiative" to enshrine "irrevocable socialism" in the Cuban Constitution. The BBC reported that, over a two-week period, 9 million Cubans took to the streets and 99% of all Cuban citizens signed a petition endorsing the constitutional amendment. The BBC said that many Cubans felt pressured into signing the government's petition. An extraordinary session of the National Assembly unanimously approved the amendment in June 2002. The government closed schools, offices, and factory during the session, and nationally televised the speeches; no mention was made of the Varela Project citizens' initiative during the event.

== Support for Varela Project ==
The Cuban exile community in the United States was split on the Varela Project. Many hard-liners opposed the project out of fears that a reformist proposal would legitimize the Castro regime, and a radio commentator at Radio Mambi said that he was fired for publicly supporting the project. The Cuban American National Foundation under Jorge Mas Santos, supported the Varela Project.

The Varela Project was lauded by former U.S. President Jimmy Carter when he made a historic visit to Havana in May 2002 and gave a televised address broadcast throughout Cuba. The European Union awarded Payá the Sakharov Prize for Freedom of Thought in December 2002.

== Black Spring (2003) ==
The Cuban government dismissed the Varela Project and its petition. The Cuban government said that the project was part of a "counterrevolutionary" plot and "strategy of subversion against Cuba" orchestrated by the United States and the U.S. Interests Section in Havana.

In March 2003, Cuba arrested 75 human rights activists and dissidents, including 25 members of the Varela Project, on a variety of charges. The dissidents were sentenced in public trials to prison terms of between 6 and 28 years for "mercenary activities and other acts against the independence or territorial integrity of the state". Amnesty International said it was concerned that the 75 jailed activists may be prisoners of conscience who were imprisoned for their non-violent advocacy for democracy. According to the US State Department, many of those arrested had no access to attorneys until the day of their trial, which was by a judge subordinate to the Communist Party. The United Nations High Commissioner for Human Rights expressed concern regarding the arrests and summary trials.

The US State Department said "Jose Daniel Ferrer Garcia, a Varela Project leader and one of the 75 activists arrested in March 2003, reported serving 45 days in a punishment cell for protesting the suspension of correspondence and the delivery of food and medical supplies from his family. He did not receive food or water during the first 3 days of his confinement and slept on a cement floor. Authorities confiscated his Bible and prohibited any contact with other prisoners. Ferrer was serving a 25 year sentence for "acts against the independence or the territorial integrity of the State.""

According to the US State Department, "Fabio Prieto Llorente, one of the 75 activists arrested in March 2003, reported he was held in a small cell with leaky walls and a cement slab for a bed. The cell was infested with rats, frogs, and insects".

The US State Department said "Yarai Reyes, wife of Normando Hernandez Gonzalez, 1 of the 75 political prisoners arrested in March 2003, reported that prison authorities incited common prisoners to beat her husband".

According to the US State Department "Barbara Rojo Arias, wife of Omar Ruiz Hernandez, an independent journalist and 1 of the 75 human rights activists arrested in March 2003, reported that her husband was denied access to required medications for his heart condition and stomach problems.

The US State Department said "Oscar Espinosa Chepe, a political prisoner released during the year, reported that prison officials regularly denied him adequate medical treatment during his 20-month incarceration".

The US State Department said that Dr. Oscar Elias Biscet "was sent to a punishment cell for refusing to eat in the prison cafeteria, wear the uniform of common prisoners, and stand at attention when guards entered his cell. He was not permitted to read, write, or leave his cell to get exercise. In addition, prison authorities refused to accept food and medical supplies brought by Morejon or permit anyone to bring him food. As a result, Biscet found himself on a virtual hunger strike".
