= José Daniel Ferrer =

Cuban opposition leader (born 1970)

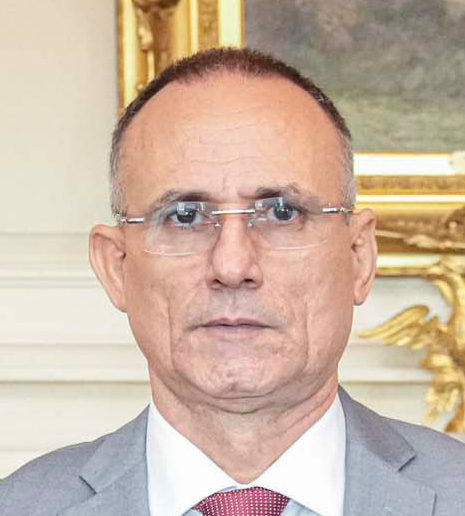
- Ferrer in 2025
- Born: José Daniel Ferrer García; July 29, 1970 (age 56)
- Occupation: Human Rights Activist
- Known for: Prisoner of conscience of the Black Spring (Cuba) and since 2021, Cuban opposition leader since Oswaldo Payá's death in 2012
- Title: Executive Secretary of the Unión Patriótica de Cuba (UNPACU)
- Opponents: Fidel Castro; Raúl Castro; Miguel Díaz-Canel
- Children: 3
- Relatives: Luis Enrique Ferrer García (brother)
- Awards: XIII Premio Internacional de Derechos Humanos de la Fundación Hispano-Cubana, con sede en Madrid. NED Democracy Award (2009)
- Website: http://www.unpacu.org

José Daniel Ferrer García (born July 29, 1970) is a Cuban opposition leader, human rights activist, whom the international and Spanish media claim to be "the visible head of the dissident movement in the interior of the island since the death of Oswaldo Payá, in July 2012." Since 2025, he has been living in exile in Miami.

As a member of the Christian Liberation Movement (MCL) in 2003, Ferrer was the oriental leader for collecting signatures among the Varela Project, in which 25,000 signatories petitioned the Cuban government to guarantee freedom of speech and freedom of assembly as well as institute a multi-party democracy. José Daniel was imprisoned in 2003 for his participation as a leader of the Varela Project, and was sentenced to 25 years. In prison from 2003 to 2011, he was declared a prisoner of conscience for the Black Spring of Cuba by Amnesty International.

Ferrer is the founder of the Patriotic Union of Cuba (UNPACU), which is an umbrella group that has hosted since 2011 many Cuban dissident organizations, a union that was extended with the merger of the Guillermo Fariñas organization in 2013, which was absorbed by UNPACU.

== 2003 arrest ==
Ferrer was detained during the subsequent Black Spring crackdown of March 2003 and sentenced to 25 years' imprisonment for being one of the main promoters of the Varela Project. His brother Luis Enrique Ferrer García, also an MCL activist by then, was sentenced to 28 years. In May 2003, José Daniel began a hunger strike after he was allegedly refused medical treatment for an intestinal issue. He was also subjected to punishment cells for refusing to stand in the presence of military or prison guards. The prison cells are reportedly and habitually below the international standard and the Standard Minimum Rules for the Treatment of Prisoners.

Amnesty International declared both Ferrer brothers to be prisoners of conscience. US President Barack Obama called for Ferrer's release in 2009, urging the Cuban government to allow him to "fully participate in a democratic future in Cuba."

Ferrer remained in prison until 2011. He and Félix Navarro Rodríguez were released on 23 March 2011 as part of an agreement between the Cuban government and the Catholic Church. They were the last two prisoners of the Black Spring to be released. Ferrer refused the option to emigrate to Spain, stating, "I want to see a free people, and the best place to fight is here inside."

== 2011-2013 ==
José Daniel Ferrer received, like the rest of the prisoners of the Group called “the 75” (“Grupo de los 75”), the option of being released in exchange for leaving Cuba to Spain, due to the pressure of the international public opinion after the death in the prison of the political prisoner Orlando Zapata Tamayo, on February 23, 2010, and the following hunger strike of Guillermo Fariñas, who demanded that the Cuban government release the sick political prisoners.

But José Daniel was one of the 12 prisoners of conscience who assumed his sentence, and refused to be forced to leave Cuba for being released, and in 2011 he still remained in prison along with very few colleagues of the 75, being finally released by the Cuban government along with Félix Navarro Rodríguez, the last two prisoners of conscience of the Group of the 75 in prison, on March 22, 2011.

On August 24, 2011, already released from jail, and in Cuba, he created the Patriotic Union of Cuba (UNPACU).

Ferrer was detained again in April 2012 for "public disorder", and again for two days in August 2012 for his work with Unión Patriótica de Cuba (UNPACU). Amnesty International described the arrests as part of "a pattern of harassment by the Cuban authorities against UNPACU members and other political dissidents." Due to his activism, Ferrer is frequently arrested and harassed by Cuban authorities. He was arrested over 100 times throughout his decades-long activism.

During the period of growth of the Patriotic Union of Cuba (UNPACU), and among numerous detentions of José Daniel Ferrer that were considered political by several reputed human rights organizations, the Patriotic Union of Cuba, on February 27, 2013, communicates the absorption of the peaceful dissident organization FANTU, one of the less numerous in the island but most notorious outside Cuba, led by then by Guillermo Fariñas, and also a multitude of other opposition organizations within the island through the integration of many of its most notorious leaders, including 8 of the 12 prisoners of conscience of the Group of 75 who decided to remain in Cuba. In the process of merging FANTU and UNPACU, Jose Daniel Ferrer and Guillermo Fariñas promulgated in a press note that the head of the new organization should be collegiate, stating "that their leadership will be collegially as a practical way to combat chieftainship".

José Daniel Ferrer García was appointed in February 2013 Executive Secretary of the Patriotic Union of Cuba (UNPACU) by all members of the UNPACU and still remains as Executive Secretary.

Since his release from prison, José Daniel Ferrer has been refused by the Cuban Government, until only once in 2016, to travel abroad, under his condition of having an extrapenal license, despite the fact that other opposition personalities have been able to do so and that the government has informed that anyone with Cuban passport could travel outside the island, since in mid-October 2012 the decree amending the immigration law in Cuba, which previously made it difficult to travel outside the island, was made official.

José Daniel Ferrer García was appointed in February 2013 Executive Secretary of the Patriotic Union of Cuba (UNPACU) by all members of the UNPACU and still remains as Executive Secretary. However, years later, following the announcement of the reestablishment of Diplomatic relations between the Governments of the United States of America and Cuba, some organizations decided to separate in friendly terms and each return to their original organization, and so Jose Daniel Ferrer resumed in front of UNPACU, while between December 2014 and January 2015, Guillermo Farinas and Felix Navarro and their respective organizations left UNPACU.

Within the opposition to the Cuban government is characterized by its willingness, through the creation of sufficient "social mass" that "through non-violent struggle forces the government to sit at the negotiating table”, to achieve an "equal to equal and serious" dialogue in order to achieve the so-called "national reconciliation" and avoid any kind of "fraticide".

== 2019-2025 ==
On October 1, 2019, Ferrer was detained by the police after being assaulted in his own home alongside four other activists. In a closed-door trial, he received a 4 ½-year-imprisonment sentence for allegedly abducting and assaulting a man in jail. He served six months in jail and then after international pressure he was released on house arrest.

On July 11, 2021, Ferrer was arrested again while attempting to join a protest in the eastern city of Santiago de Cuba which was part of coordinated anti-government protests that occurred across the country. He was detained on charges of public disorder, and then on charges that he violated his house arrest conditions. The court ordered him to serve the rest of his 4 ½ year sentence in jail instead of house arrest.

On January 16, 2025, Ferrer was released as a part of the deal under which the Cuban government agreed to release 553 political prisoners as a condition for the removal of Cuba from a US list of countries that support terrorism. On April 29, Ferrer was rearrested after his parole was revoked.

In a letter written from prison on September 10 and released by his wife Nelva Ismaray Ortega on October 3, Ferrer announced that he would go into exile by October 6 as part of an agreement with authorities after experiencing "torture" and "humiliation" in prison. He finally left on October 13 for Florida following a request by the US government.

== Recognition ==
In 2009, Ferrer and fellow Cuban dissidents Librado Linares García, Iván Hernández Carrillo, Jorge Luis García Pérez, and Iris Pérez Aguilera were jointly awarded the Democracy Award of the US National Endowment for Democracy. Ferrer was unable to attend, as he was still in prison.

In 2011, Ferrer received the XIII International Award on Human Rights of the Cuban-Hispanic Foundation, in Madrid.

== Personal life ==
The son of Daniel Ferrer and Amelia García, he has three children with his ex-wife Cantillo Belkis Ramírez: Martha Beatriz, José Daniel, Fátima Victoria. Ramirez is a member of the Ladies in White, a group of wives of political prisoners protesting every Sunday for their release. She was herself detained for 48 hours in March 2012.

José Daniel Ferrer's himself and his relatives, including his wife and children, as well as other members of the Cuban Patriotic Union have received the support of Amnesty International and the World Organization Against Torture when arrested, robbed of their homes and retained in an unknown location after police detentions.
