= 2024 State of the Union Address =

Speech by US President Joe Biden

- Full video of the speech as published by the White House
- Date: March 7, 2024
- Time: 9:00 p.m. (EST)
- Duration: 1 hour, 7 minutes
- Venue: House Chamber, United States Capitol
- Location: Washington, D.C.; 38°53′19.8″N 77°00′32.8″W
- Type: State of the Union Address
- Participants: Joe Biden; Kamala Harris; Mike Johnson
- Footage: C-SPAN
- Previous: 2023 State of the Union Address
- Next: 2025 Joint session speech
- Website: Full text by Archives.gov

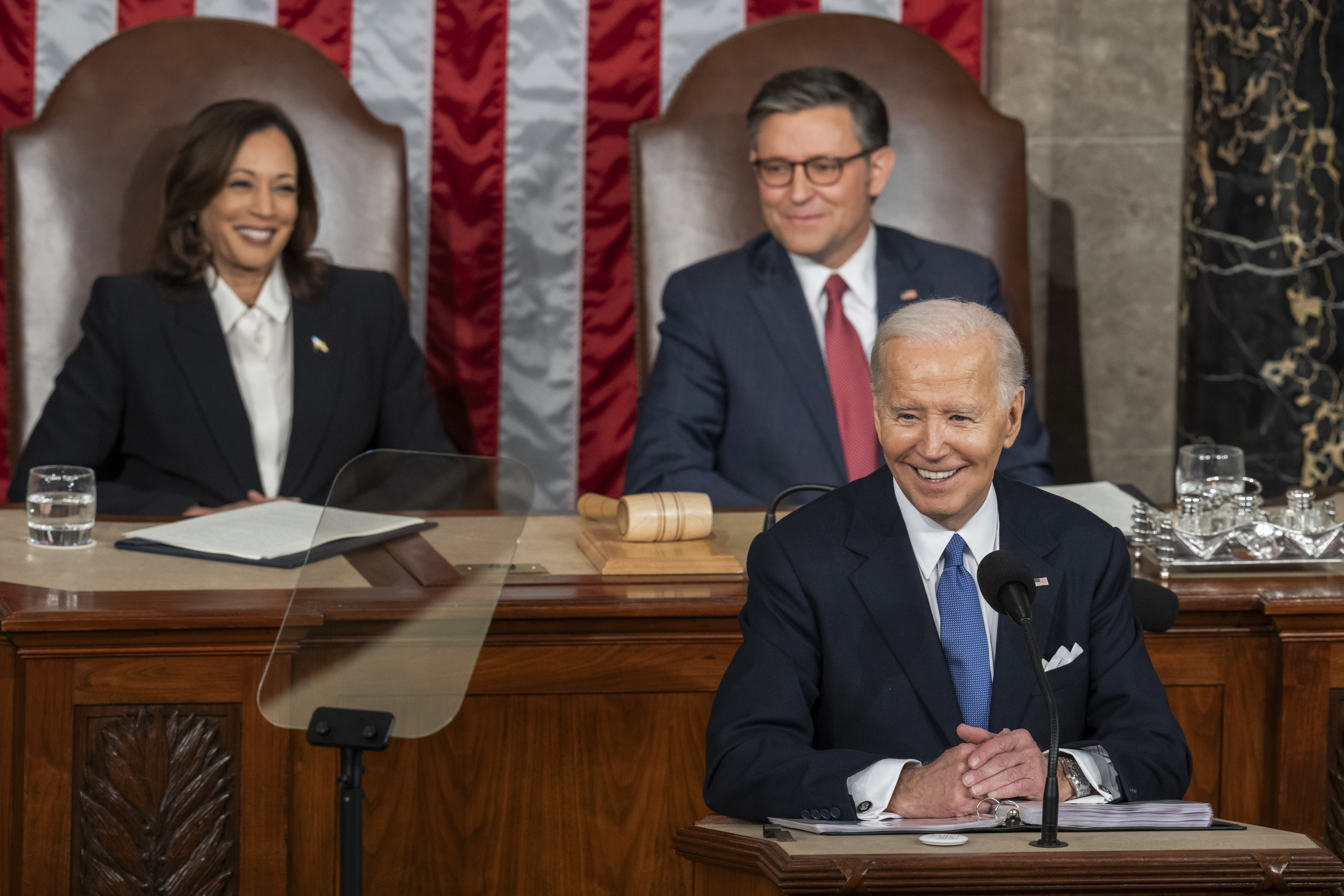
President Biden delivering the State of the Union address to the U.S. Congress

Joe Biden, the 46th president of the United States, delivered a State of the Union address on March 7, 2024, at 9:00 p.m. EST, in the chamber of the House of Representatives to the 118th Congress.

It was Biden's third and final State of the Union Address and his fourth and final speech to a joint session of the United States Congress. Presiding over this joint session was the House Speaker, Mike Johnson, accompanied by Kamala Harris, the vice president, in her capacity as the president of the Senate.

This marked the first time in history that a U.S. president gave three consecutive official State of the Union addresses in front of three different speakers, namely 2022 with Nancy Pelosi, 2023 with Kevin McCarthy, and 2024 with Mike Johnson.

== Address ==
On January 6, House Speaker Mike Johnson formally invited Biden to address the joint session of Congress. It took place two days after Super Tuesday. The speech was expected to provide Biden a chance to address issues such as the economy, democracy, abortion rights, the United States–Mexico border crisis, the Russo-Ukrainian war, and the Gaza war.

President Biden formally began his speech at 9:26 p.m. EST on March 7, 2024; his speech was scheduled for 9 p.m. EST. Like President Trump's 2019 State of the Union Address, Biden began the address without an introduction from the speaker of the House, breaking with a SOTU custom. Secretary of Education Miguel Cardona was named the designated survivor and was at an undisclosed location during the address so that, in case of a catastrophe, the continuity of government would be upheld.

=== Topics ===
Some of the topics mentioned by Biden included the Russo-Ukrainian war, the border crisis, the Gaza war, gun crime, rescheduling cannabis, student loan debt, medication prices, and abortion. He also mentioned the murder of Laken Riley the previous month before the speech in the context of border policy, and advocated for a two-state solution to the Israeli–Palestinian conflict, and also indirectly joked about his age.

While Biden did not mention former President and 2024 Republican candidate Donald Trump by name, he referred to him as "my predecessor" 13 times during the speech, including moments where he referenced Trump's praise of January 6 Capitol attack participants, and accused Trump of influencing Republican members of Congress to reject a bill intended to reduce incentives for migrants to attempt border crossings.

In an apparent unscripted moment while referencing the 2022 Dobbs v. Jackson Women's Health Organization court decision that overturned Roe v. Wade, Biden looked and spoke directly to the Supreme Court Justices seated in the audience, saying, "With all due respect, justices, women are not without ... electoral or political power... you're about to realize just how much..." before he was interrupted by audience applause.

== Protests and disruptions ==
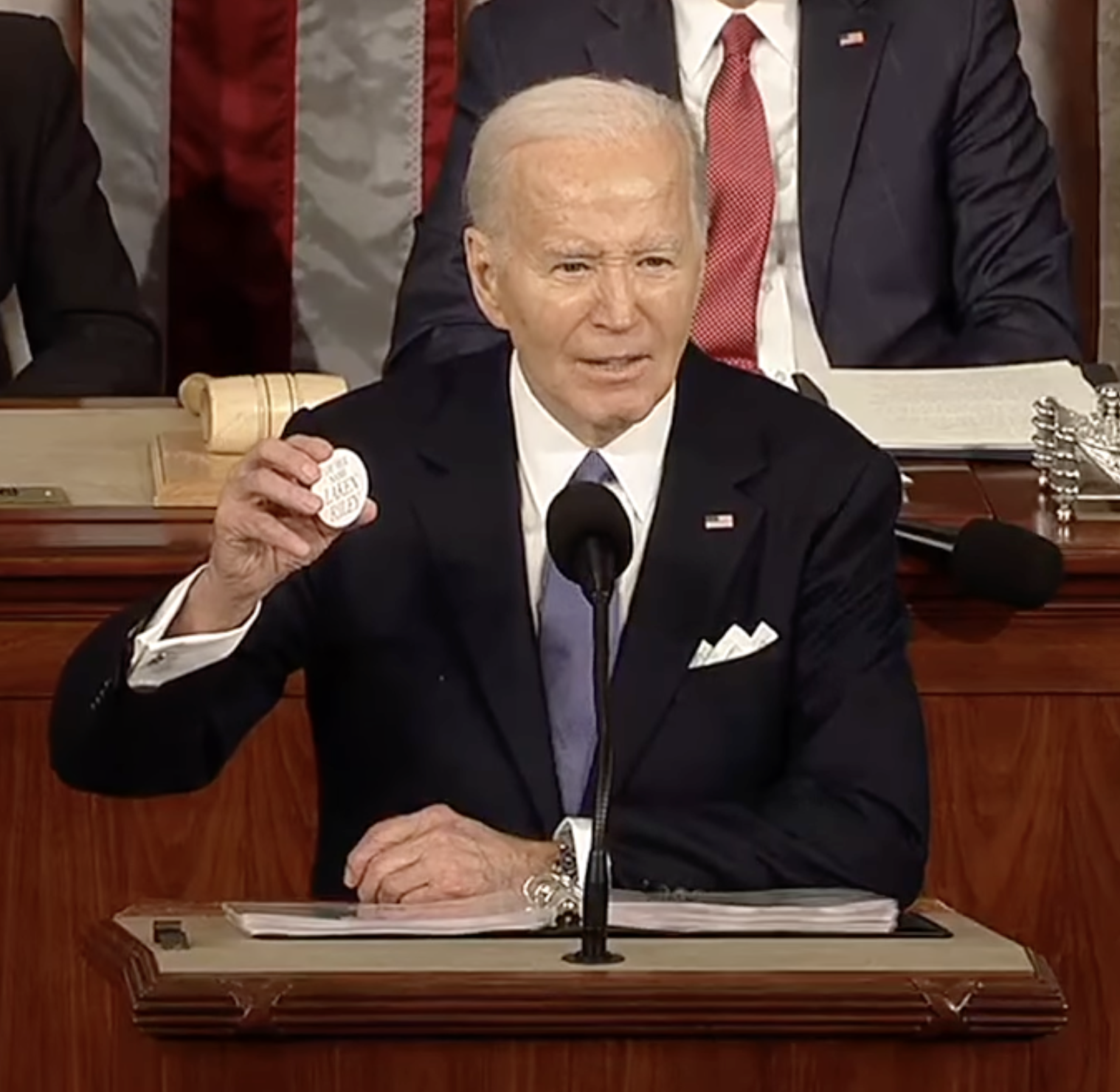
Joe Biden holds a pin given out by Rep. Marjorie Taylor Greene reading "Say her name Laken Riley" in response to her interruptions and request.

In the hours leading up to the speech, multiple pro-Palestinian groups led by Jewish Voice for Peace conducted demonstrations in the streets leading to the Capitol and blocked his motorcade. The motorcade took an alternate route which did not approach protestors.

Late in the speech, Steven Nikoui, who was attending the speech in the upper chamber, shouted repeatedly about the Abbey Gate bombing in the 2021 Kabul airport attack during the U.S. withdrawal from Afghanistan in August 2021. Nikoui was removed from the upper chamber and arrested. Republican Representative Brian Mast reported that the heckling Nikoui was a Gold Star father who lost a child at the Abbey Gate bombing and attended the event as Mast's guest.

During the speech, Rep. Marjorie Taylor Greene repeatedly interrupted Biden, particularly during his mentions of the Mexican border crisis. Biden responded by picking up a pin handed out by Greene which read "Say her name Laken Riley", and stated "Lincoln Riley, an innocent young woman who was killed by an illegal. That's right." Biden mispronounced Laken's name, instead saying "Lincoln". Greene would continue to interrupt Biden during the speech.

== Responses ==
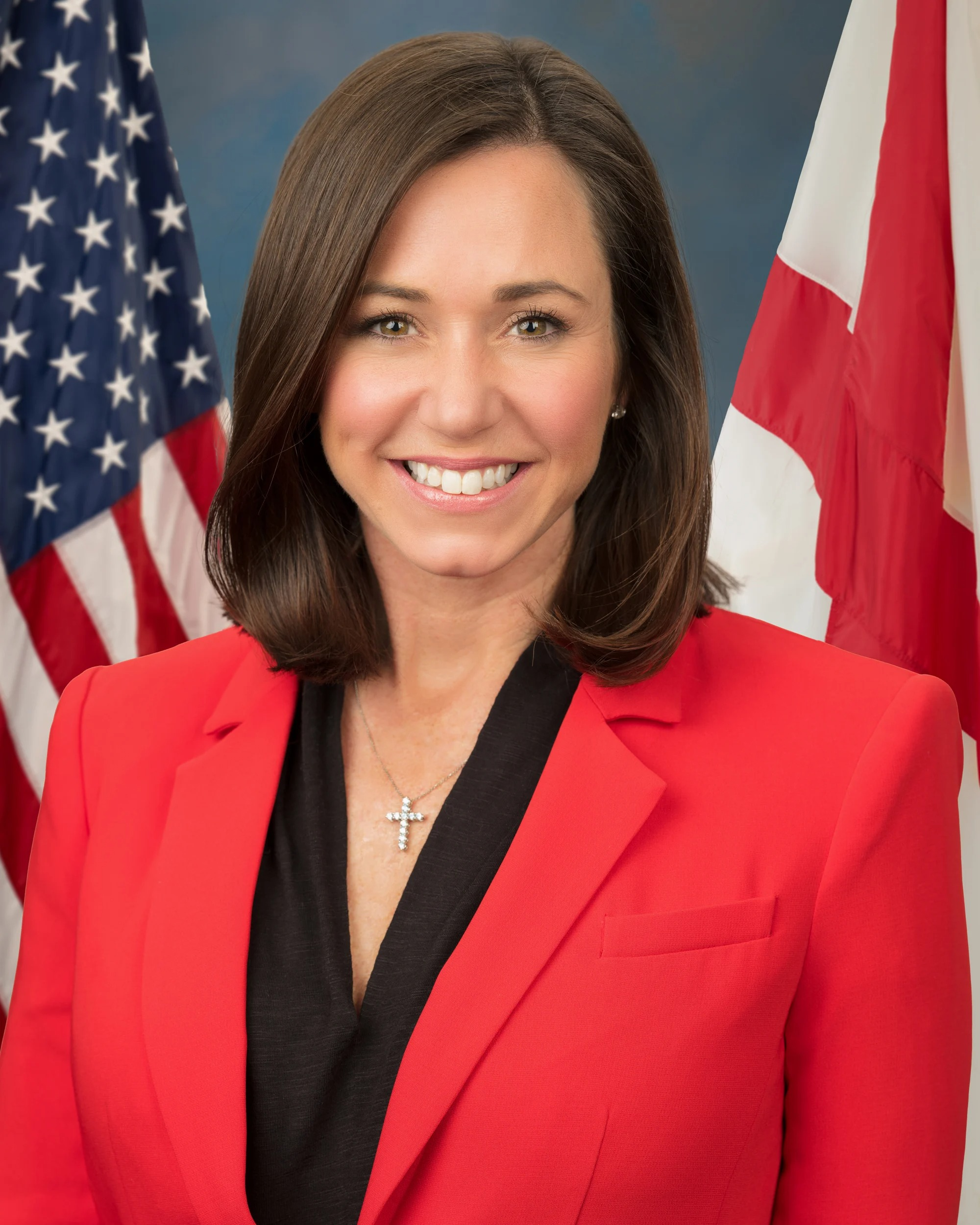
Senator Katie Britt

Republican Senator Katie Britt gave the Republican response. Republican Representative Monica De La Cruz gave a rebuttal in Spanish. Former president Donald Trump scheduled a live "play by play" rebuttal of Biden's address on his Truth Social platform at the same time as the speech; the platform experienced widespread outages and glitches upon the start of the livestream.

The first independent response was delivered by Robert F. Kennedy Jr. who also did a Spanish version of his response.

Britt's speech, which primarily touched on the issue of immigration, received largely negative reviews, including from Republicans, and was criticized for its inaccuracy. Stylistically, critics mostly focused on Britt's delivery, describing it as "dramatic", "creepy", "insincere" and "over-the-top", and questioned Britt's decision to stage the response in her kitchen. Journalist Jonathan M. Katz accused her of misrepresenting the story of sex trafficking victim Karla Jacinto Romero. According to research by Katz, the crimes described by Britt occurred in Mexico during the presidency of George W. Bush. Britt's response was the subject of that weekend's Saturday Night Live cold open with actress Scarlett Johansson portraying Britt.

== Reactions ==
Rex Huppke described the president's speech as "fiery" and Phillip Elliot said it acted as a "sharp rebuke" against concerns about Biden's age and stamina.

Some Democrats criticized Biden for referring to the killer of Laken Riley as "an illegal" instead of "undocumented" in his speech, and for mispronouncing her name as "Lincoln Riley". Biden regretted using the word "illegal" and said that he should have instead used the word "undocumented".

A fact-check by CNN found that while most of Biden's statements were accurate, some of his claims were false, misleading or needed context.

== Viewership ==
The State of the Union drew 32.2 million viewers, an 18% increase over the 2023 address. MSNBC was the only network to deliver higher viewership for the 2024 speech than for the 2022 speech.

Network	Viewers
FNC	5,640,000
ABC	5,024,000
NBC	4,328,000
MSNBC	4,200,000
CBS	3,935,000
CNN	2,511,000
Fox	1,744,000
Fox Business	240,000
CNBC	112,000

Broadcast networks Cable news networks

=== Independent response coverage ===
The Independent response was delivered by Robert F. Kennedy Jr. It received 25.4 million views in 48 hours.

Network	Viewers
TikTok	10,800,000
Twitter	10,300,000
Instagram	3,000,000
YouTube	1,000,000
Facebook	346,000
Rumble	29,000

=== 4-year average viewership ===
Here are the viewership averages for the networks, covering the four years' worth of Biden addresses to congress. CNN is the only network in 2024 to finish below its address-to-congress average.

Network	Viewers
FNC	5,115,000
ABC	4,939,000
NBC	4,088,000
CBS	3,949,000
MSNBC	3,941,000
CNN	3,233,000
Fox	1,722,000

== Guests ==
=== Activists ===
- Jazmin Cazares: Advocate for gun violence prevention following the death of her sister, Jackie, in the Uvalde shooting in 2022.
- Riley Gaines: Conservative activist and former competitive swimmer who has been advocating against transgender women in women's sports after tying for fifth with openly transgender female champion Lia Thomas in the 200-yard NCAA freestyle championship.
- Rosa María Payá: Cuban human rights activist and opposition leader whose father, Oswaldo Payá, was killed in a car crash in 2012 by Ángel Carromero.
- Bettie Mae Fikes: Singer and civil rights advocate who was present on Bloody Sunday in Selma, Alabama, in 1965, where Alabama state troopers attacked civil rights activists crossing the Edmund Pettus Bridge.
- Yulia Navalnaya: Widow of the late Russian opposition leader Alexei Navalny, who died in a penal colony on February 16 while serving a 19-year prison sentence. The United States had placed over 500 new sanctions in response to his death in late February. However, she was unable to make an appearance though she and her daughter had met with Biden in San Francisco several weeks earlier.

=== Officers or veterans ===
- Brandon Budlong: United States Border Patrol agent who has witnessed the worsening crisis at the border.
- John Frankman: Former U.S. Army Captain and Green Beret who left the military following the Department of Defense's mandated COVID-19 vaccine policy.
- Fred Hamilton: A Montana veteran who was exposed to toxins who was helped by the PACT Act.
- Steve Nikoui: Father of Marine Lance Corporal Kareem Nikoui, who was killed in Afghanistan during the U.S. withdrawal in 2021, as a guest of Brian Mast
- Shelby Nikitin: U.S. Navy officer who recently completed her command tour on board the USS Thomas Hudner, which has been protecting cargo ships in the Red Sea following attacks by Houthi rebels that has damaged ships, halted global trade, and resulted in deaths of crew members and military personnel.
- Kameryn Pupunu: Police officer for the county of Maui whose hometown of Lahaina was severely damaged by wildfires in 2023. Pupunu saved many lives during the fire, but tragically he lost four of his immediate family members.
- Zunxu Tian and Lt. Ben Kurian: Two NYPD officers who were attacked by a mob in Times Square consisting of illegal immigrants that entered through the Mexico–United States border.

=== Politicians ===
- Kathy Hochul, governor of New York, as a guest of Representative Adriano Espaillat.
- Garnett L. Johnson: Mayor of Augusta, Georgia, which has seen a Workforce Hub that will bring advanced manufacturing, construction, and other skilled trades to students in the area.
- Ulf Kristersson: Prime Minister of Sweden, which joined NATO on the same day in response to security concerns surrounding the Russian invasion of Ukraine.
- Bill Lee, governor of Tennessee, as a guest of Senator Bill Hagerty.
- Stephen Roe Lewis: Governor of the Gila River Indian Community who has brought innovative solutions to long-term issues confronted by the Community. His tenure has seen the completion of the first new schools on the Reservation in over 100 years and the first solar-over-canal project in the Western Hemisphere.
- Olena Zelenska: First lady of Ukraine who was invited but unable to come. This came as Congress stalled aid for Ukraine in the Russo-Ukrainian war.

=== CEOs or presidents of organizations ===
- Barbara Collura: President and CEO of Resolve: The National Infertility Association who has also been invited in response to the decision made on LePage v. Center for Reproductive Medicine.
- Shawn Fain: President of United Auto Workers, a union that went on strike in September 2023 following a contract disagreement that resulted in increased wages and return of cost of living adjustments, an end to two tiered employment system, improved overtime and retirement benefits, and a written contract right to strike over plant closures.
- Natalie King: Founder and CEO of Detroit-based Dunamis Charge, the first-ever African American women-owned electric vehicle charger manufacturing company in the United States that has over 135 workers and is on track to manufacture 400,000 electric vehicle chargers by 2025.
- Justin Phillips: Founder and CEO of Overdose Lifeline, a non-profit from Indiana dedicated to reducing the stigma of substance use disorder and preventing deaths resulting from opioid and fentanyl overdose. He helped sign Aaron's Law, which allows individuals to have access to Narcan to save people from overdosing.
- Rashawn Spivey: Founder of Hero Plumbing in Milwaukee after graduating from a plumbing program at Milwaukee Area Technical College and completing an apprenticeship with Plumbers Local 75, which has been replacing lead water pipes.
- Liz Shuler: President of the AFL-CIO, who has already endorsed the 2024 Biden campaign.
- Katherine Rowe: President of the College of William and Mary, as a guest of Representative Rob Wittman

=== Private or miscellaneous people ===
- Kate Cox: A Dallas mother who traveled out of state after suing to have an abortion because of the Texas Heartbeat Act, which has outlawed all abortions since the overturning of Roe v. Wade in 2022. Amanda Zurawski, who was in a situation nearly identical to Cox and is also suing the state to overturn the bans, returned to this year's event, having suffered sepsis and nearly died two years ago.
- Kayla Smith: An Idaho mother who moved her family to Washington in 2022 after she was unable to have an abortion due to abortion ban in Idaho following the overturning of Roe v. Wade.
- Caitlin Bernard: Doctor who provided an abortion in Indiana to a ten-year-old girl who was raped in Ohio in 2022 due to Ohio outlawing most cases for abortion following the overturning of Roe v. Wade.
- Elizabeth Jordan Carr: The first American to have been born via in-vitro fertilization (IVF). The invitation is in response to LePage v. Center for Reproductive Medicine where the Alabama Supreme Court ruled that frozen embryos can be considered children under state law on February 21.
- Latorya Beasley: An Alabama woman who was in the process of expanding her family with her husband through IVF until the decision made on LePage v. Center for Reproductive Medicine resulted in many IVF clinics in the state shutting down.
- Families of the American Hostages in Gaza: American families whose members or relatives in Israel were killed or abducted and held hostage in Gaza since the October 7 attacks in 2023. The hostages have suffered through starvation, physical and mental abuse, and sexual violence at the hands of Hamas.
- Intimaa Salama: Dentist and master's student at St. Louis University who has lost 35 members of her family in Gaza amid the Gaza war, which has seen nearly 40,000 people killed.
- Ella and Mikhail Gershkovich: Parents of Evan Gershkovich, a journalist and reporter for The Wall Street Journal who has been detained in Russia since March 2023 on charges of espionage.
- Jason Riley and Allyson Phillips: Parents of Augusta University student Laken Riley who was murdered while jogging. The accused is Jose Antonio Ibarra, a 26-year-old Venezuelan citizen who entered the United States illegally in 2022.
- Gabriel Shipton: Brother of WikiLeaks founder Julian Assange, who was arrested in London after being expelled from the Ecuadorian embassy in April 2019 and is currently facing extradition to the United States.
- Dawn Chapman: A St. Louis mother and founder of Just Moms, an advocacy group for victims of radiation from nuclear contamination in Missouri who supports the Radiation Exposure Compensation Act.
- Samantha Ervin-Upsher: Apprentice with the United Brotherhood of Carpenters Local 432 in Pittsburgh, Pennsylvania. The city received a boost thanks to a program by the Biden administration that focused on bringing good jobs to the city.
- Kris Blackley: Oncology nurse and the Director of Patient Navigation for the Atrium Health Levine Cancer Institute in North Carolina which received a massive boost as a result of the Cancer Moonshot initiative.
- Fat Joe: Rapper who has been fighting for price transparency in healthcare, as the cost of living increases in the United States.
- Steven Hadfield: A North Carolina man who has a rare blood cancer and is a diabetic, which both required expensive drugs that are now covered by the Inflation Reduction Act.
- Michael Knowles: Conservative political commentator and host of The Michael Knowles Show, which is part of The Daily Wire network.
- Keenan Jones: A public middle school educator from Minnesota wrote an email to President Biden thanking him for the Public Service Loan Forgiveness Program, which eliminated his remaining student loan debt after 10 years.
- Maria Shriver: Author, journalist, former First Lady of California, and founder of the Women's Alzheimer's Movement and Strategic Advisor on Women's Health and Alzheimer's at Cleveland Clinic who worked with the Biden administration in 2023 to help create the first-ever White House Initiative on Women's Health Research.
- Dawn Simms: Member of the United Auto Workers (UAW) Local 1268 and third-generation autoworker on at Belvidere Assembly in Illinois. When the plant was idled, she was faced with moving or working away from her son, but the UAW helped reopen the plant.
- Tiffany Zoeller: Military spouse and medical coder at Fort Liberty's Womack Army Medical Center who has been working with the Biden administration to help veterans and their families get good paying jobs after service.

== See also ==
- List of joint sessions of the United States Congress
- Timeline of the Joe Biden presidency (2024 Q1)

Preceded by 2023 State of the Union Address	State of the Union addresses 2024	Succeeded by 2025 joint session speech
