= Galano =

Galano is a surname. Notable people with the surname include:

- Ángel Molina Galano (1889–1936), Spanish military officer
- Clemente Galano (1610–1666), Italian missionary and theologian
- Cristian Galano (born 1991), Italian footballer
- Ivonne Malleza Galano, Cuban democracy activist
- Luis Manuel Galano (born 1982), Cuban Paralympic athlete

== See also ==
- Galanos, surname
