= Galanos =

Galanos is a surname. Notable people with the surname include:

- Alexis Galanos (1940–2019), Greek Cypriot politician
- Chris Galanos (born 1982), American Christian pastor
- Deborah Galanos, Australian actress
- Dimitrios Galanos (1760–1833), Greek Indologist
- James Galanos (1924–2016), American fashion designer and couturier
- Mike Galanos (born 1964), American news anchor

== See also ==
- Galano, surname
