= Orlando Zapata =

Cuban activist

- Born: May 15, 1967; Santiago de Cuba, Cuba
- Died: February 23, 2010 (aged 42); Havana, Cuba
- Cause of death: starvation
- Known for: Political activism

Orlando Zapata Tamayo (May 15, 1967 – February 23, 2010) was a Cuban political activist and a political prisoner who died after hunger striking for 85 days. His death received international attention, and was viewed as a significant setback in Cuba's relationship with the U.S. the EU and the rest of the world.

== Biography ==
=== Early life ===
Orlando Zapata was the second son of a family of five brothers based in Banes, where he lived with his mother, a washerwoman by profession, and his stepfather. Looking for a better future, he emigrated to Havana, where he came into contact with former political prisoner Enri Saumell Peña, with whom he began in political activism. He was a member of the Republican Alternative Movement.

=== Imprisonment ===
Zapata was arrested on December 6, 2002, by agents of the Cuban police on charges of contempt, for which he was imprisoned for over three months. On March 20, 2003, 13 days after he was freed, he was arrested for a second time during a crackdown on dissidents and sent to the Kilo 7 prison in Camagüey. At the time of his arrest, he was participating in a hunger strike organized by the Assembly to Promote a Civil Society, taking place at the home of Marta Beatriz Roque Cabello. The hunger strike was meant as a petition for the release of several comrades.

He was charged with contempt, public disorder, and disobedience and sentenced to 36 years in prison after several judicial processes. As a result, Amnesty International recognized him as a prisoner of conscience, "imprisoned solely for having peacefully exercised [his] rights to freedom of expression, association and assembly". The socialist Monthly Review, in contrast, expressed skepticism of Amnesty's statement, alleging that Zapata was arrested and convicted several times on charges of fraud, firearm possession, and assault with a machete.

Orlando Zapata Tamayo was moved around several prisons, including Quivicán Prison, Guanajay Prison, and Combinado del Este Prison in Havana. Amnesty International reported that on October 20, 2003 Orlando "was dragged along the floor of the Combinado del Este Prison by prison officials after he requested medical attention, leaving his back full of lacerations." Orlando managed to smuggle a letter out following a brutal beating that was published by Cubanet in April 2004:

"My dear brothers in the internal opposition in Cuba. I have many things to say to you, but I did not want to do it with paper and ink, because I hope to go to you one day when our country is free without the Castro dictatorship. Long live human rights, with my blood I wrote to you so that this be saved as evidence of the savagery we are subjected to that are victims of the Pedro Luis Boitel political prisoners [movement]."* This type of mistreatment went on for years. Orlando Zapata Tamayo was pushed into undergoing hunger strikes as a last measure to try to save his own life, and dignity as a human being.

=== Hunger strike and death ===
On either December 2 or 3, 2009, Zapata began a hunger strike as a protest against the Cuban government for having denied him the choice of wearing white dissident clothes instead of the designated prisoner uniform, as well as denouncing the living conditions of other prisoners. As part of his claim, Zapata was asking for conditions comparable to those that Fidel Castro had while incarcerated after his 1953 attack against the Moncada Barracks. For their part, the Cuban government stated he refused food because authorities wouldn't put a TV set, a stove and a phone in his cell.

During the hunger strike Zapata refused to eat any food other than his mother's, who visited him every three months. According to the U.S.-based opposition group Cuban Democratic Directorate, prison authorities then denied Zapata water, which led to his deteriorated health and ultimately kidney failure.

Zapata persisted in the hunger strike and was admitted to the Camagüey Hospital at an unspecified date, where he was given fluids intravenously against his will. On February 16, 2010, his condition worsened and he was transferred to Hermanos Ameijeiras Hospital in Havana, where he ultimately died on February 23, 2010, at approximately 3:30 pm EST.

It was the first time that an opponent of the Cuban government died during a hunger strike since the 1972 death of Pedro Luis Boitel.

On March 16, 2010, an open letter condemning the Cuban government for the unjust incarceration of Orlando Zapata Tamayo and asking for the release of other political prisoners was posted in an internet blog. In less than a week the letter had obtained over 30,000 signatures. Among the signatories are prominent intellectuals from both the left and right of the political spectrum.

== Reactions to death ==
The death of dissident Orlando Zapata Tamayo leads to clampdown in Cuba. Cuban security forces rounded up political activists across the island to prevent protests at the funeral of a leading dissident who died after an 82-day hunger strike. Massive arrests, the cutting off of phone services, and an intense campaign against Zapata's reputation took place in the official media. With regards to Zapata, Cuban Television News said that he had a “long criminal history” and even transmitted a hidden camera recording of his mother inside the hospital.

Regardless, there was domestic opposition, and several international organizations as well as media condemned what had happened. Orlando Zapata Tamayo became a rallying point for the Cuban democratic opposition.

As a result, Zapata's death countered the government's monopoly on media. Unlike the death of the student leader Pedro Luis Boitel, in 1972 after a hunger strike, Zapata's death was reported with sufficient immediacy to provoke extensive backlash. Months after his sacrifice, the process of releasing the prisoners of the Black Spring began.

Raúl Castro took the "unprecedented step" of expressing public regret about the death of Zapata. During his remarks, he said Zapata was treated by top doctors and denied he was tortured. Cuban state television also aired a report where doctors who treated Zapata, said they tried to get him to eat, with Dr. María Ester Hernández stating:

We explained to him the consequences of his decision at every turn and how much he was endangering his life with this. But he kept it up.

Cuban state newspapers, meanwhile, described Zapata as a "common criminal falsely elevated to martyr status."

During a plenary session of the European Parliament, MEPs condemned the cruel death of the imprisoned political dissident and voted on a joint resolution calling for more respect for the human rights of the prisoner in Cuba. A large majority of MEPs backed the resolution which was tabled by all the political groups in the parliament.

The U.S. State Department stated that it was "deeply saddened" by Zapata's death, while the European Union called on Cuba to release its remaining political prisoners. Spain issued a statement remembering Zapata as a "human rights defender", while France expressed "dismay" and stated that its government had been lobbying Cuba on Zapata's behalf. The incident was seen as a significant setback for the thawing of Spanish-Cuban and U.S.-Cuban relations, with one analyst describing it as "the nail in the coffin of Spain's efforts to improve EU-Cuba ties".

On 23 February 2012, the Ladies in White met at the former home of deceased leader Laura Pollan to commemorate the second anniversary of Zapata's death. They were protested by a group of government supporters in coordination with security agents, who chanted "Down with the worms!" and "Long Live Raúl!"

Russian Historian Yuri Doykov dedicated his book to Orlando Zapata

== See also ==
- Cuban dissident movement
- Wilmar Villar Mendoza
- Cuban Hunger Strike
