= Dania Virgen García =

Human rights activist

Dania Virgen García is a Cuban dissident, blogger, human rights activist and independent journalist. She is a native Cuban, having been born in the capital city, Havana. She has been an active dissenter in Cuban affairs since 1988. Originally writing for local self-published newspapers, in 2009 she established her blog. Her articles are also regularly published by the Cuban independent weekly newspaper "Primavera" and the internet news server "Cubanet.org", (a site which informs readers about the current political and social situation in Cuba).

== Affiliations ==
Dania Virgen García is a regular participant in Havana's Ladies in White marches, a street protest held on Sundays by wives and relatives of Cuban political prisoners. She also co-operates with the Human Rights Defence movement.

== Trouble with Cuban Authorities ==
On April 22, 2010, Dania Virgen García was arrested and subsequently sentenced to a prison term of one year and eight months. At the time of her sentencing, the charges against her had still not been made known. Her conviction was later overturned on appeal.

According to her blog, on March 27, 2012, Dania Virgen García was again arrested ahead of a papal mass celebrated by Pope Benedict XI in Jose Marti Square, Havana. She was held for 33 hours and later released without charge.
