= Wilmar Villar Mendoza =

Cuban dissident

Wilmar Villar Mendoza (also written as Wilman) was a Cuban dissident. He was born around 1980. He married Maritza Pelegrino Cabrales and had two children. He lived in the Contramaestre area of Santiago de Cuba.

== Biography ==
He was arrested in July 2011 after his mother in law alerted neighbors and police about a marital dispute involving domestic violence and charged for assault, disrespecting authority and resisting arrest.

At some time between August and September 2011, he joined the Cuban Patriotic Union and worked on dissident activity. He participated in a public protest against the government. In November of the year he was sentenced to four years in prison. He was sent to Aguaderas prison in Santiago de Cuba.

His wife Maritza Pelegrino attributed her husband's political activism to anger over his father's death in custody five years earlier, though she could not explain why he joined the movement only last year.

Villar started a hunger strike soon after arriving at the prison. He was put in solitary confinement. He was sent to Juan Bruno Zayas Hospital in January 2012 after suffering health problems. The Ladies in White and the CPU both had a vigil to support him. In January 2012 he died. The government claimed he had multiple organ failure, pneumonia, and septic shock. The hunger strike had lasted over 50 days. Amnesty International designated Villar a prisoner of conscience, the announcement coming one day after his death.

Representatives from the European Union and the governments of the United States and Spain made statements about his death, criticizing the Cuban government.

The government also stated he was not a dissident, but that he had been arrested for violence and injuring his wife at the 2011 protest. The government also stated he had not been on hunger strike.

== See also ==
- Luis Enrique Ferrer Garcia
- Orlando Zapata
- Ivonne Malleza Galano
