= Night Is Not Eternal =

2024 documentary film

- Official poster
- Directed by: Nanfu Wang
- Written by: Nanfu Wang; Michael Shade
- Produced by: Nanfu Wang; Lori Cheatle
- Cinematography: Javier Labrador Deulofeu
- Edited by: Michael Shade
- Music by: Chad Cannon; San Miguel Perez
- Production companies: HBO Documentary Films; Little Horse Crossing the River; Hard Working Movies; Secret Sauce Media; Nika Media
- Distributed by: HBO
- Release dates: October 20, 2024 (Montclair); November 15, 2024
- Running time: 92 minutes
- Country: United States
- Language: English

Night Is Not Eternal is a 2024 documentary film directed and produced by Nanfu Wang. It follows Cuban activist Rosa María Payá Acevedo over the course of several years.

It had its world premiere at the Montclair Film Festival on October 20, 2024, and a limited release on November 15, 2024, prior to a broadcast on HBO on November 19, 2024. The documentary won a 2024 Peabody Award.

== Premise ==
The film follows Cuban activist Rosa María Payá Acevedo over seven years and the growth of her political career and advocacy for democratic reform in Cuba. It compares Payá's activism with Wang's own experiences growing up in China under an authoritarian government. The film also documents Payá's partial support for U.S. presidential nominee and then president Donald Trump, and Wang's discomfort with it.

== Production and release ==
Nanfu Wang met Rosa María Payá Acevedo at a film festival, with Wang wanting to make a film revolving around those living under authoritarianism wanting to make change.

It had its world premiere at the Montclair Film Festival on October 20, 2024, and was scheduled to be released in a limited release on November 15, 2024, prior to a broadcast on HBO on November 19, 2024.

The documentary is named after a book by Payá's father Oswaldo Payá, also an activist.

== Reception ==
Metacritic, which uses a weighted average, assigned the film a score of 87 out of 100, based on 5 critics, indicating "universal acclaim".

Mayra E. Gates of RogerEbert.com gave the film 3.5 out of 4 stars, writing: "The result is a striking look at the sacrifices—and concessions—people make in the fight for freedom and a chilling portrait of how the propaganda of those with power can make this very fight seem impossible to win." Christian Zilko of IndieWire gave the film a B, writing: "Wang leaves audiences with the sense that, for good or for ill, the individuality of humans will never be fully stamped out." Carlos Aguilar, writing for Variety, overall praised the documentary while wanting more "hard-hitting, confrontational exchanges" about Payá's support for Donald Trump.
