= Solidarity Prize =

The Solidarity Prize
- Nagroda Solidarności
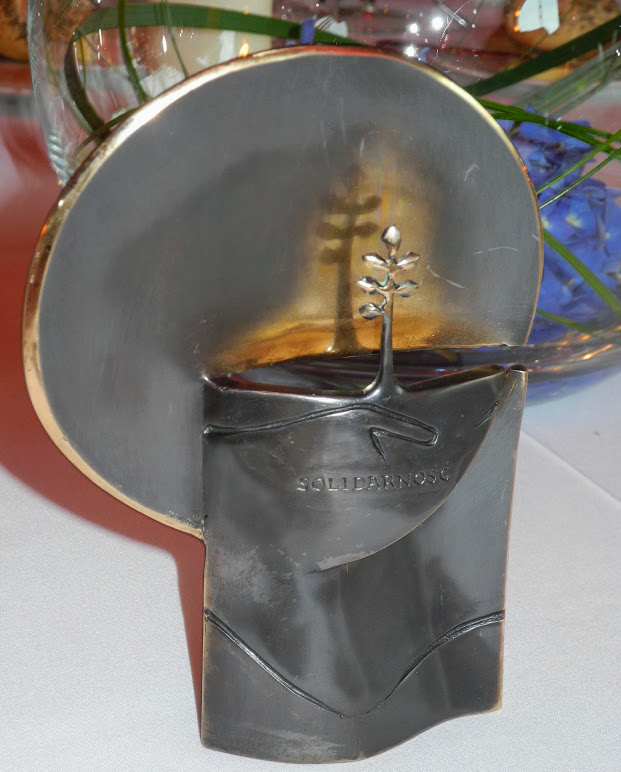
- Awarded for: Promotion and protection of democracy and civil liberties
- Country: Poland
- First award: 2014
- Website: website

The Solidarity Prize (Polish: Nagroda Solidarności) – Polish award for promotion and protection of democracy and civil liberties. The prize has been established by the Minister of Foreign Affairs of the Republic of Poland.

The award was established in 2014 but after 2015 was suspended for several years. It was relaunched in 2024 after a change of government in Poland.

== Selection process ==
The selection of the laureate is a two-stage process. Fifteen nominators, are presenting their candidates. Among nominators are Nobel Peace Prize Laureates, Polish minister of foreign affairs: current and former and globally recognized authorities in the field of democracy and human rights. Every year 1/3 of nominators is changed. The final decision on awarding the prize is made by the chapter of award, which in 2014 has been chaired by Poland's former president Lech Wałęsa.

=== Nominating committee ===
- 2014: Catherine Ashton, Władysław Bartoszewski, Carl Bildt, Emma Bonino, Carl Gershman, Paul Graham, Tawakkol Karman, Frank La Rue, Myroslav Marynovych, Roza Otunbayeva, Mary Robinson, Arseny Roginsky, Adam Daniel Rotfeld, Yoani Sánchez, Aung San Suu Kyi.

== Prize ==
Each Laureate receives a statuette. The prize has also financial dimension: 1 mln EUR in total:

- 250,000 EUR is the cash is for the laureate;
- 50,000 EUR is allocated to finance the laureate's participation in the award ceremony and study visit to Poland for the laureate or a group of persons selected by him/her;
- 700 000 EUR is to be allocated to finance development cooperation projects, indicated by the laureate.

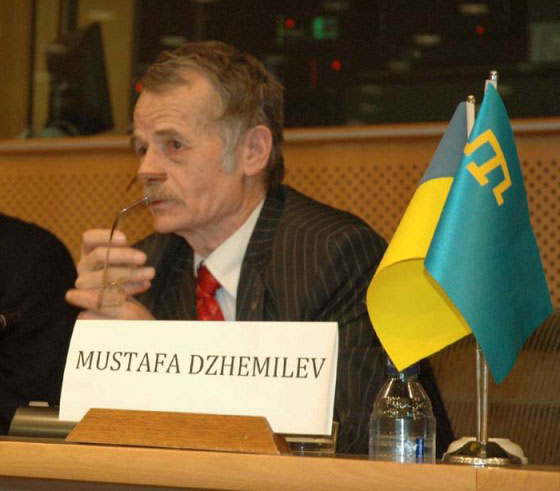
Mustafa Dzhemilev

== Laureates ==
- 2014 – Mustafa Dzhemilev – leader of the Crimean Tatars who was also nominated several times to the Nobel Peace Prize.
- 2015 – Zhanna Nemtsova, journalist, social activist, and the oldest daughter of Boris Nemtsov, Russian oppositionist assassinated in February 2015
- 2024 – Pavel Latushko, Belarusian opposition activist and Head and Representative for the Transfer of Power in the United Transitional Cabinet
- 2025 – Berta Soler, Cuban dissident and leader of Ladies in White
