= Cuban political prisoners hunger strike of 2010 =

Dissidents in Cuba have staged many hunger strikes - but the hunger strikes of 2010 had a significant impact, in part, because one protester died while in prison and another was near death. The negative worldwide publicity caused by the hunger strikers pressured the Cuban government to authorize a release of 52 prisoners.

== Background ==
On February 24, 2010, this particular protest campaign for the release of Cuban political prisoners was one of, if not the greatest struggle between the Cuban government and the political opposition. Previous protesters before this campaign including Orlando Zapata Tamayo and Guillermo Fariñas, fought for democracy within Cuba, including freedoms of speech and press, freedom to organize political parties, access to the internet, and ultimately, western democratic political freedoms. Most of those imprisoned were arrested and tried in 2003 accused of accepting aid from the United States. The major objective of this protest initiated by Orlando Zapata Tamayo, and carried on by Guillermo Fariñas, was to improve prison conditions for political prisoners.

== Guillermo Fariñas ==
Guillermo Fariñas Hernández is a Cuban psychologist, an independent journalist and a political protester, who has participated in over 23 hunger strikes in Cuba to protest the actions of the Cuban regime. Fariñas began his hunger strike on February 24 of 2010, after another prisoner, Orlando Zapata Tamayo, died while on hunger strike. Fariñas’ strike was to not only protest the death of Zapata but also for the release of 26 other gravely ill prisoners who he believed were not receiving proper medical assistance.

== The Protests ==
As Fariñas started to decline in health, other anti-communist groups stepped up to assist him in his protest, including the Institute for Democracy in Eastern Europe . A letter of support for Fariñas protest was sent by "Viasna" from the Human Rights Center as well. However, even with the hunger strike and some world support, the Cuban government showed no signs of backing down as they felt they were being pressured and even tried to argue it was because of paid U.S., mercenaries trying to overthrow their political system. On May 2, 2010, the government allowed the "Ladies in White", a non-violent activist group composed of the wives prisoners to march every Sunday . While President Raul Castro claimed he would not give into the "blackmail of the hunger strike", he changed his mind after mediation by the Catholic Church and released 52 prisoners.

== Aftermath ==
After the Cuban government had negotiations with the Roman Catholic Church and finally agreed to move the political inmates to prisons that gave better medical assistance and allowed them to be closer to their families. Elizardo Sanchez, who is an activist and spokesperson for the Cuban Commission of Human Rights and National Reconciliation, placed charges against the Cuban government for unruly arrests as well as ‘acts of repression’ against the Eastern Democratic Alliance in Santiago de Cuba. July 7, 2010 was the day that discussions between the Cuban government and the Catholic Church ended with an agreement to release the total of 52 prisoners, including the 26 inmates for which Fariñas had protested . On July 8, Fariñas ended his hunger strike, which had lasted just over 130 days.

== See also ==
- Communist Party of Cuba
- Hunger strike
- Orlando Zapata Tamayo
- Human Rights in Cuba
- Elizardo Sánchez
