= Angel Moya Acosta =

Cuban dissident

- Born: September 20, 1964 (age 60); Havana, Cuba
- Occupation: construction worker
- Organization: Alternative Option Movement
- Known for: imprisonment, democracy activism
- Spouse: Berta Soler
- Children: Luis Angel and Lienys

Angel Moya Acosta (born 20 September 1964) is a Cuban construction worker and the founder of the Alternative Option Movement.

Moya fought for one-and-a-half years in the Cuban intervention in Angola in the late 1980s. In the following decade, Moya was arrested several times for his activism. In December 1997, he was arrested on his way to join a public memorial, and in November 1999 he was arrested for participating in a prayer session for dissident Oscar Biscet. On 15 December 1999, he was arrested and imprisoned after a demonstration along with fellow Alternative Option Movement members Guido and Ariel Sigler Amaya; the latter arrest caused Amnesty International to designate him a prisoner of conscience. In 2000, he was arrested and imprisoned for a year for "disrespect" after commemorating the anniversary of the Universal Declaration of Human Rights.

He was again imprisoned during the Black Spring in 2003, and sentenced to 20 years in jail. His wife Berta Soler, now leader of the Ladies in White movement, campaigned on his behalf.

When Moya suffered a herniated disc in October 2004, Soler began a campaign to urge the government to give him an operation, submitting a letter to President Fidel Castro on his behalf and staging a rare protest in Havana's Plaza de la Revolución with the Ladies in White. She described the protest as "my right and duty as a wife". After two days of protest, Moya was given surgery.

After Moya's early release from prison in 2011, he and Soler chose to remain in Cuba and continue their calls for the release of political prisoners, despite being offered emigration to Spain.

In March 2012, Soler and Moya were detained along with three dozen other demonstrators when they staged their weekly protest ahead of a visit of Pope Benedict XVI. Soler told reporters that authorities had warned the Ladies to avoid Benedict's public appearances, including masses.

== Family ==
Soler is a microbiology technician at a Havana hospital. Moya and Soler have two sons, Luis Angel and Lienys.
