= Rosa María Payá =

Cuban dissident activist (born 1989)

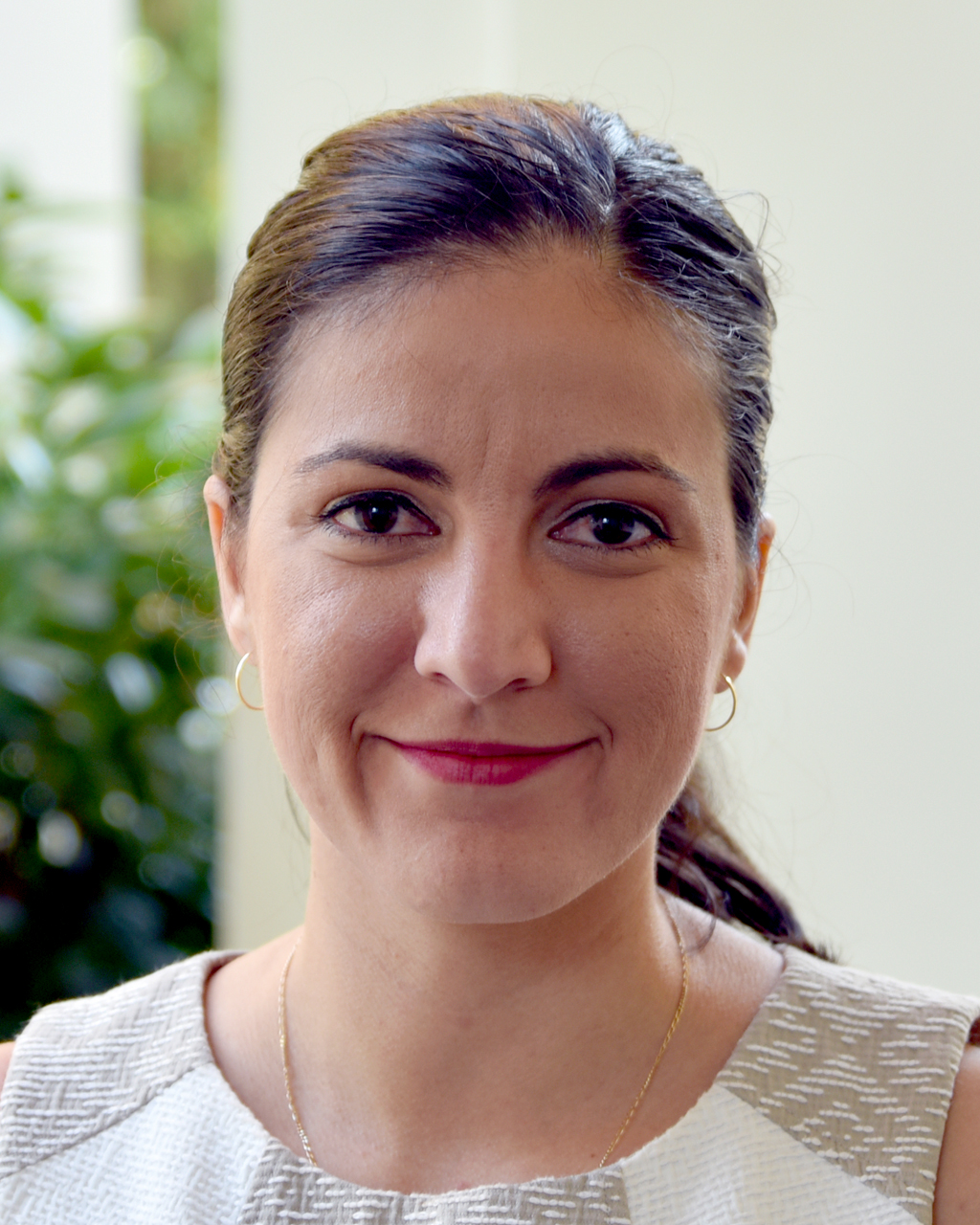
- Born: Rosa María Payá Acevedo; 10 January 1989 (age 37); Havana, Cuba
- Known for: Human rights activist
- Parents: Oswaldo Payá (father); Ofelia Acevedo (mother)

Rosa María Payá Acevedo (Havana, 10 January 1989) is a Cuban activist.

The 2024 documentary feature titled Night is Not Eternal, directed by Nanfu Wang, follows her journey as an activist. It won a Peabody Award at the 85th Annual Ceremony.

In March 2025, the OAS (Organization of American States) elected Rosa María Payá, the U.S. candidate, as a member of the IACHR (Inter-American Commission on Human Rights).

== Early life and education ==
She is the daughter of Oswaldo Payá and his wife, Ofelia Acevedo de Payá. She has two brothers, Oswaldo José and Reinaldo Isaías. She holds a degree in physics and has also studied photography.

The daughter of activist Oswaldo Payá, head of the Christian Liberation Movement, she took up much of his activist work after he was killed by Ángel Carromero on 22 July 2012; Carromero was found guilty of involuntary manslaughter, but a 2023 ruling by the Inter-American Commission of Human Rights (IACHR) holds the Cuban state responsible for the death of Oswaldo Payá.

== Activism ==
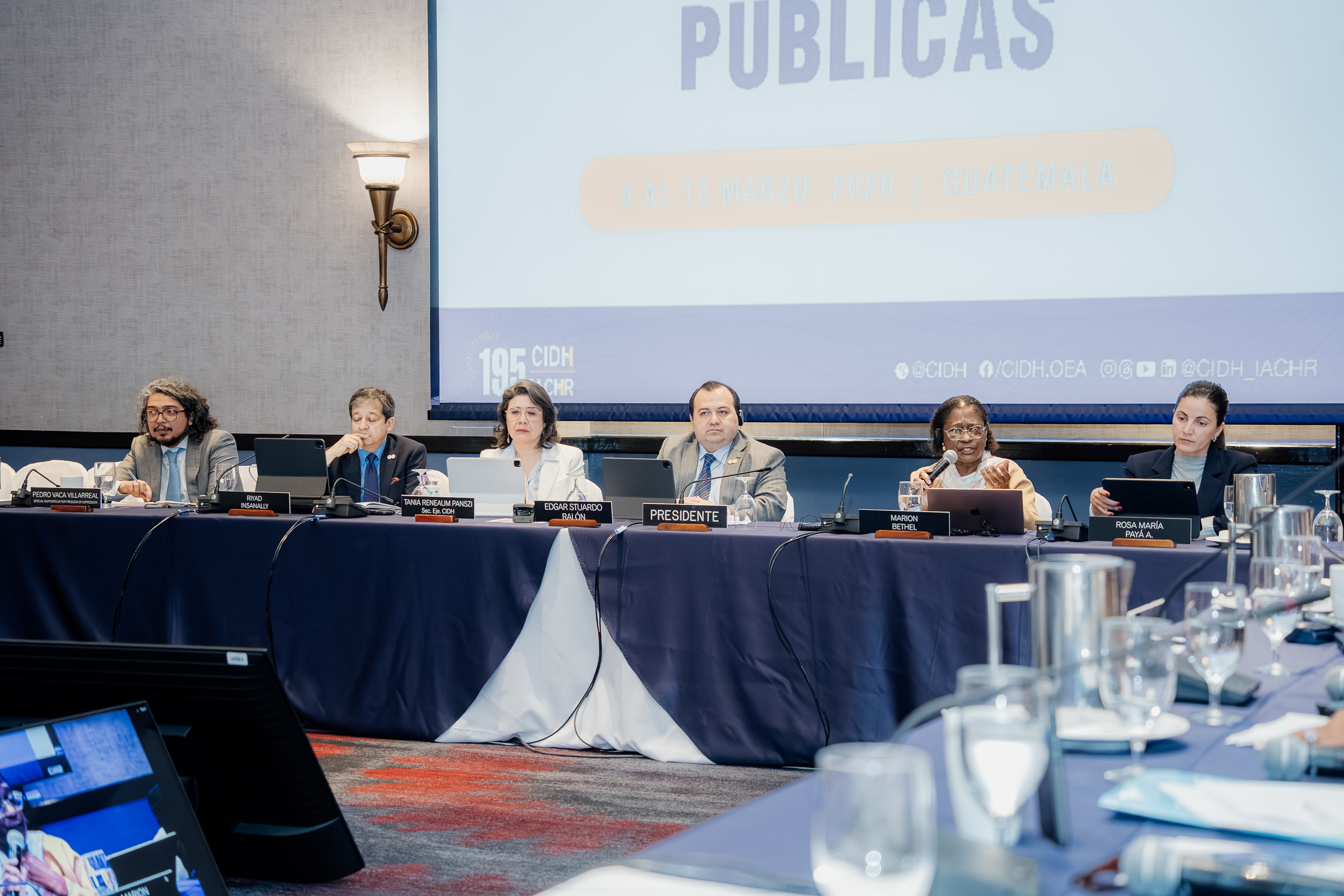
CIDH in March 2026 (on the right)

=== 2013 ===
In March 2013, Payá addressed the UN Human Rights Council, criticizing the Cuban government for its failure to allow a plebiscite on basic freedoms. When she went on to state that her father's death, contrary to the official Cuban line, was not accidental, the Cuban delegate, Juan Quintanilla, began to bang on his desk. He called Payá a “mercenary” and asked the president of the UNHRC to silence her. The US member spoke up for Payá, while the representatives of China, Russia, Pakistan, Nicaragua, and Belarus supported Cuba. Payá, after being allowed to continue, urged the UN to independently investigate her father's death and asked: “When will the people of Cuba finally enjoy basic democracy and fundamental freedoms?” Quintanilla again called her a “mercenary” and a tool of the US government, and accused her of “aggression against [her] own people.”

In a March 2013 interview with Cubanet, she discussed her efforts to persuade the United Nations to investigate her father's death, her speech at the HRC, her recent meetings with representatives of various European governments, and her dismay at the solidarity of Spanish socialist politicians with the Cuban government. Asked about Raul Castro's “reforms,” she accused the regime of trying “to sell an image of openness” without actually effecting meaningful change. The reforms themselves, she maintained, were “a mechanism of control,” having been framed not as rights but as “a concession by the government.”

Payá wrote in July 2013 about detention centers in the Bahamas where Cuban refugees were undergoing “systematic abuses.”

=== 2014 ===
In an open letter to President Barack Obama dated 19 December 2014, she questioned America's new Cuba policy, telling Obama that “your laws are not what is preventing the free market and access to information in Cuba; it is the Cuban government’s legislation and its constant censorship.” She criticized Obama for “treating as 'normal' the illegitimate government in Havana” and urged him to make “a real commitment to the Cuban people” that would involve not intervention but support for “solutions that we Cubans have created ourselves.”

In a December 2014 article, “Only Cubans Can Save Cuba,” she noted that America's change in its Cuban policy occurred only a week after 100 Cuban democracy protesters had been arrested and treated violently. “The US president has now rewarded the Cuban regime for having released a prisoner,” she wrote. “The Barack Obama administration has decided to normalize relations with a government that isn’t normal, because it is not legitimate. The Cuban people never chose it, and it violates our most fundamental human rights. In the ongoing dialogue between the elites of Washington and Havana, where are the Cuban people?”

=== 2015 ===
In January 2015, Payá attended President Obama's State of the Union Address as the guest of Senator Marco Rubio. She also spoke with several members of Congress, arguing that U.S. representatives engaged in discussions with the Cuban government should raise the issue of democracy and call for an independent investigation into her father's death. On 24 January, Payá met with the senior White House advisor for Latin America, Ricardo Zúñiga, giving him a list of specific points that she felt he should raise in talks with the Cuban government.

In April 2015, Payá was arrested upon her arrival in Panama, where she attended the Summit of the Americas. At the summit, Barack Obama was scheduled to meet with Raúl Castro, the first meeting between a U.S. president and a Cuban president since the Cuban Revolution. The arresting police officer told her: “You are going to be deported to Cuba if you cause any trouble or start raising banners. Go back to your own country to cause trouble.” After being held for four hours and having her possessions ransacked, she was released. Panamanian officials later claimed that the incident was “a bureaucratic mistake.” The same thing, however, happened to a visiting Argentinian activist, Micaela Hierro Dori. In an article, Payá noted that while “Cuban civil society activists and the foreigners who work with us were threatened and detained in Panama,” Panamanian officials did nothing to Cuban government officials attending the summit.

At the Forum of Youth Movements, also held in Panama at that time, Payá announced the establishment of a new “citizen initiative” called Cuba Decides that sought to achieve a transition to democracy. The initiative, which called for a plebiscite in Cuba, was viewed as a sort of continuation of her father's Varela Project, which, despite collecting the more than 10,000 signatures required by the Cuban Constitution for the proposal of legislative amendments, had been rejected by the National Assembly.

On 11 May 2015, after almost two years in exile, Payá returned to Cuba to visit her father's grave. “I return to Havana as a Cuban citizen, with all my documentation,” she said, “but I also go back exercising the right that entitles all Cubans — even if the law recognizes it or not — to return to our country at our own discretion.” Asked by an interviewer whether her visit was temporary or permanent, she replied: “Where I am visiting is the United States. I interrupted this visit to come to my own country. These definitions of final departure, of living forever in one country or another, belong to the language of totalitarianism. The Cuban government still keeps intact the power to decide whose departure is permanent and who is not allowed to return.” Asked whether she saw herself as a future leader, she replied: “I do not want to speak for Cubans because Cubans never elected me. I have a proposal: that Cubans have a voice.”

In July 2015 Payá went to the new Cuban embassy in Washington with a letter from her mother requesting autopsy reports for Oswaldo Payá and Harold Cepero, but embassy officials, who saw her through a window, did not answer the door and summoned the police.

Writing after the November 2015 jihadist massacre in Paris, she recalled a visit to that city two years earlier. Visiting the Eiffel Tower, she had heard a variety of languages being spoken around her and thought: “this is the sound of freedom of movement. Something thousands of Cubans have not had.” She now noted wryly, however, that this freedom of movement had also made possible the jihadist massacre. “Solidarity,” she concluded, “is no longer a question of altruism but of survival. We do not ask for whom the bell tolls. As in Paris and so in Havana, it tolls for all of us.”

In December 2015, Payá was elected president of the Latin American Youth Network for Democracy at its congress in Costa Rica. She then led a delegation from the Latin American Network of Youth for Democracy to Venezuela to observe legislative elections. The purpose, she said, was to convey a “signal of solidarity” to Venezuelan democrats. While in Venezuela she held an event with Lilian Tintori, wife of Leopoldo Lopez, to call for his release from prison.

=== 2016 ===
In February 2016, she addressed the Geneva Summit for Human Rights and Democracy, accusing the Castros of perpetrating “a fake transition not to democracy, but to legitimize their total control upon Cuban society, with a renewed image for the international public opinion, in order to attract foreign investors and financial credits.” This process, she charged, was leading Cuba toward a system of “dynastic State capitalism” or “Castro capitalism.”

Later in February, she traveled to Cuba to attend a mass in Havana in memory of her father. She also handed government representatives a petition, signed by 10,000 Cubans, asking for a plebiscite on freedom.

=== 2017 ===
In February 2017, she called on President Donald Trump to "press firmly on the Cuban government to respond to the claims of its people for the first time in 60 years." In the same month, Acevedo and other Cuban dissidents recognized Luis Almagro, the secretary-general of the Organization of American States, for "defending human rights in their country even though the government denied him entry to attend the ceremony."

=== 2025 ===
In March 2025, she was appointed a member of the Inter-American Commission on Human Rights (IACHR) of the Organization of American States. The Trump administration waged an intense campaign in support of the Cuban opposition figure. In her message, Rosa María Payá lashed out at the governments of Cuba, Nicaragua, and Venezuela, which U.S. Secretary of State Marco Rubio considers “enemies of humanity.”

== Honors ==
The magazine People en Español named her one of the 25 most powerful Latin women of 2014, along with such celebrities as Jennifer López and Sofía Vergara.

She is a Special Rapporteur on the Rights of the Child and a commissioner of the Comisión Interamericana de Derechos Humanos (CIDH).
