= Experience Life =

Church building in Texas, United States

Coordinates: 33.4989°N 101.9761°W

Experience Life was a non-denominational Christian church in Lubbock, Texas .

== History ==
The church was founded in 2007 by Chris Galanos. the church has grown to an average weekly attendance of over 3,500 people.

Experience Life had been named one of the Top 100 fastest-growing churches in the United States by Outreach Magazine. In 2009, Experience Life was named the 8th fastest-growing church in the country & the 1st fastest-growing church in the country by percentage gain, with 186% growth. In 2010, Experience Life was named the 2nd fastest-growing church in the country. In 2009 and 2010, Experience Life was also recognized as the youngest church on the fastest-growing list.

The lead pastor of Experience Life, Chris Galanos, has been named the youngest mega-church pastor in the country.

According to Experience Life's 2012 Annual Report, 4,977 people have committed their lives to Christ and 2,890 people have been baptized since the church started in 2007. In 2012, the church gave away 15% of their income and served over 10,000 hours in their community.

In the fall of 2019, Experience Life supposedly started meeting in many homes across West Texas, yet they do not advertise how to attend one of these churches. Their website is focused solely on monetary donations.
