= Patriotic Union of Cuba =

Political party in Cuba

Patriotic Union of Cuba Unión Patriótica de Cuba
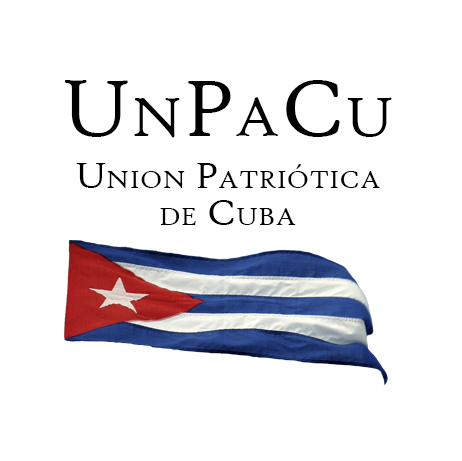
- Leader: José Daniel Ferrer
- Founded: 24 August 2011
- Split from: Christian Liberation Movement
- Headquarters: Altamira, Santiago de Cuba
- Ideology: Anti-communism; Cuban nationalism Patriotism; Christian democracy Nonviolence
- Political position: Centre-right
- Colors: Black; Blue
- Slogan: Una Cuba con todos y para el bien de todos ('One Cuba with everyone and for the good of all')

Website
- unpacu.org

The Patriotic Union of Cuba (Spanish: Unión Patriótica de Cuba, UNPACU) is a Cuban dissident political organization founded in 2011 and led by José Daniel Ferrer. It has been described as one of the largest and most active dissident organizations in Cuba, bringing together opposition activists from across the country.

The organization describes itself as a civic movement advocating peaceful opposition to restrictions on civil liberties in Cuba and promoting nonviolent political change.

== History ==
The Patriotic Union of Cuba was founded on 24 August 2011 by human rights activist José Daniel Ferrer after his departure from the Christian Liberation Movement. He has served as the organization’s General Coordinator since its founding. The organization’s National Steering Committee consists of four activists based in Cuba, with Ferrer as its leader. According to UNPACU, the group has more than 3,000 activists organized into 122 local cells coordinated through 25 headquarters across the country.

UNPACU operates a Youth Front, coordinated nationally by Carlos Amel Oliva, with Anyer Blanco Rodrserving as its representative abroad. According to the organization, the Youth Front organizes activities for children and young people focused on civic values, human rights education, and sports and recreational programs.

== Platform ==
According to its official programmatic documents, UNPACU advocates democratic political reforms in Cuba, including political pluralism, free and fair elections, and expanded civil and political liberties. The organization proposes the adoption of a social market economy combining private enterprise with social protections, recognition of multiple forms of property ownership, and legal guarantees for economic activity and investment, including participation by the Cuban diaspora.

In its foreign policy proposals, UNPACU states that a future democratic Cuba should maintain close relations with Western countries and promote cooperation and dialogue among nations. The organization criticizes the Cuban government’s alliances with states it describes as having poor human rights records and expresses support for international solidarity among democratic actors, while emphasizing that political change in Cuba should be led primarily by Cuban citizens.

UNPACU describes its strategy as based on nonviolent civic action and calls for national reconciliation, equality before the law, and institutional reforms aligned with international human rights standards. It has also advocated the release of political prisoners, freedom of expression and association, independent media, and the legalization of independent labor unions.
