= Mothers Against Repression =

Coordinates: 25.75765°N 80.205555°W

Mothers against repression or Mothers and women against repression (Spanish: M.A.R. por Cuba - Spanish: Madres y Mujeres Anti-Represión) is a human rights organization based in Miami, Florida, United States that campaigns against political repression in Cuba.

The group represents exiles from Cuba and is noted for intimidating more moderate exiles by holding all-night prayers in front of their homes. They protest any contact with the government of Cuba.

== Elian Gonzalez ==
M.A.R. was very active in the controversy around the child Elian.

== See also ==
- Ladies in White
