= Aron Modig =

Swedish politician

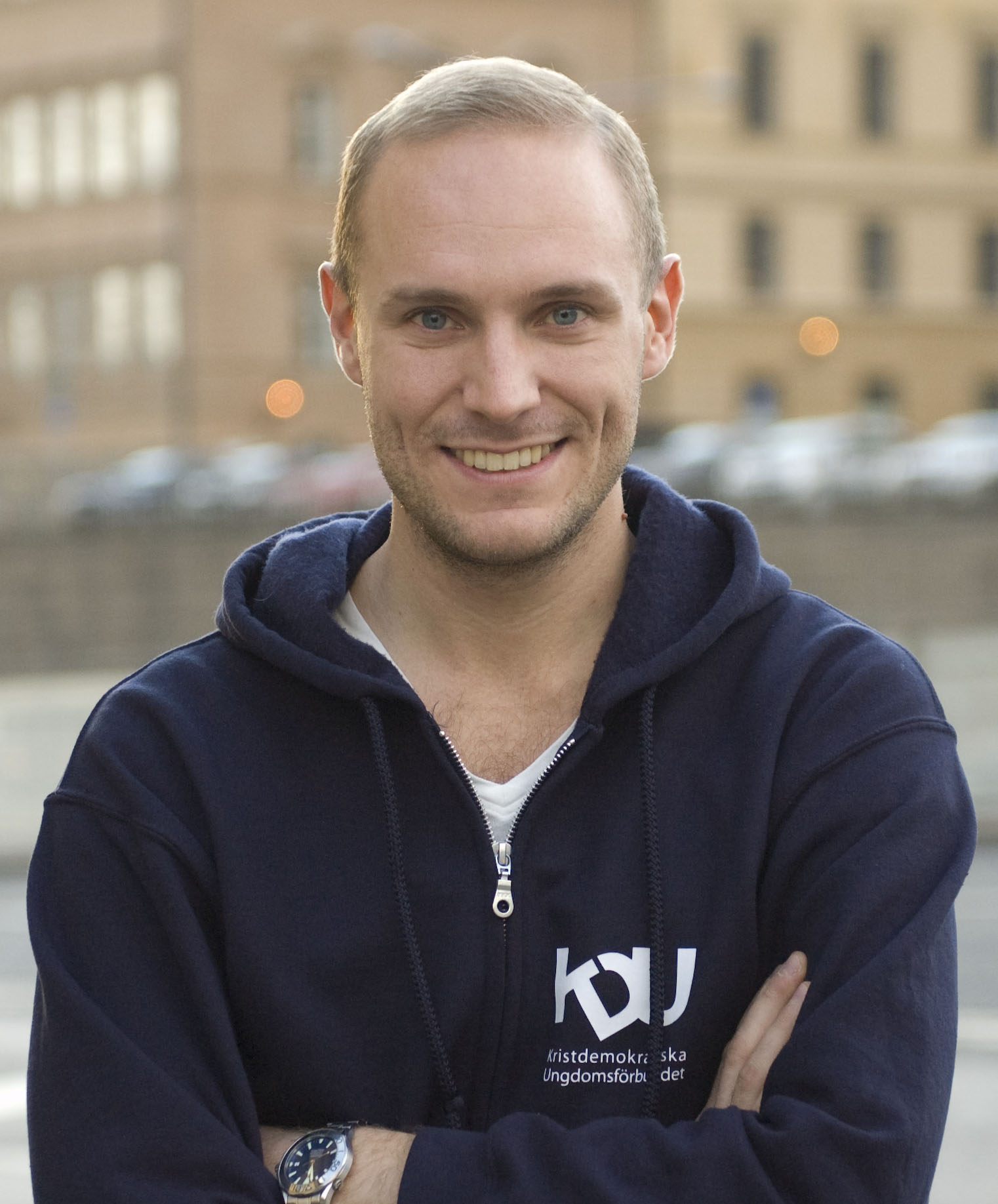

Chairman of the Young Christian Democrats
- In office June 2011 – May 2013
- Preceded by: Charlie Weimers
- Succeeded by: Sara Skyttedal

Personal details
- Born: 13 June 1985 (age 41) Söderhamn, Gävleborg County
- Party: Christian Democrats
- Education: University of Gothenburg; National University of Singapore

Aron Modig (born 13 June 1985) is a Swedish politician who was chairman of the Young Christian Democrats, the youth wing of the Christian Democrats from 2011 to 2013.

== 2012 car crash ==
In July 2012, he visited Cuba to show support for the nation's pro-democracy activists. On July 22, he was injured in a car crash while traveling with dissident and Sakharov Prize-winner Oswaldo Payá. Payá was killed at the scene.

Details of the crash are disputed. Payá's daughter Rosa María stated that her father died after the rental car in which he was traveling was rammed several times by another car. Payá's son Oswaldo added that his father had received numerous death threats and agreed that his car had been deliberately driven off the road. The official statement by the Cuban government said that the driver lost control of the vehicle and collided with a tree. Modig tells that he subsequently was taken away to an unknown place and held captive for eight days by government officials. There he was being interrogated and scolded by terms: "You shouldn't come to our country to meddle in our affairs!". He was queried about the political purposes with his stay in Cuba, but no questions were asked about the crash. At a press conference arranged by Cuban authorities on 30 July, Modig and the driver and second survivor, Ángel Carromero, stated that the crash was an accident and no other car was involved. A 2023 ruling by the Inter-American Commission of Human Rights (IACHR) held the Cuban state responsible for the murder of Oswaldo Payá.
