= Saylí Navarro =

Cuban human rights activist (born 1986)

Saylí Navarro Álvarez (born 11 March 1986) is a Cuban human rights activist. The daughter of dissident Félix Navarro Rodríguez and activist Sonia Álvarez Campillo, she has been imprisoned since 2022 after taking part in the 2021 Cuban protests. Navarro is considered to be a prisoner of conscience by Amnesty International.

== Personal life ==
Navarro was born on 11 March 1986 in Cuba. Her father, Félix Navarro Rodríguez, was a farmer who was a noted pro-democracy activist; he was arrested as part of the Black Spring in 2003 and was designated as a prisoner of conscience by Amnesty International. Navarro's mother, Sonia Álvarez Campillo, became a leading member of the Ladies in White (Spanish: Damas de Blanco), an organisation of female relatives of dissidents arrested during the Black Spring, who campaigned for their release.

== Activism ==
Navarro worked as an independent journalist reporting on human rights violations in Cuba. In 2003, following the arrest of her father, Navarro became an active member of the Ladies in White, alongside her mother, taking part in regular marches and protests. Navarro was a pro-democracy activist, serving as a leader of the Pedro Luis Boitel Democracy Movement, named after the Cuban dissident Pedro Luis Boitel.

== Arrest and imprisonment ==
On 11 July 2021, Navarro took part in protests triggered by a shortage of food and medicine in Cuba, which led to criticisms of the Cuban government, including its authoritarianism and curtailing of civil liberties, in addition to its failure to improve living conditions for ordinary Cubans. The following day, Navarro and her father were arrested in Perico, Matanzas Province while travelling to a police station to request information about detained protesters. Navarro was released on bail after several hours of detention, while her father was remanded in custody.

The trial of Navarro and her father began in January 2022; in March, Navarro was sentenced to eight years in prison on charges of assault and public disorder. After her appeal was denied the following month, she began serving her sentence on 18 April at La Bellotex, a prison in Matanzas.

In March 2023, an audio recording of Navarro was released in which she had stated Cuban authorities had been pressuring her to accept an offer of exile in exchange for being released from prison; she said she had rejected the offer.

In January 2025, Annie Zamora, the mother of political prisoner Sissi Abasca, who was imprisoned alongside Navarro, reported that Abasca and Navarro had been denied prison benefits, including access to hot water and phone calls. The poor prison conditions at La Bellotex were also criticised by Navarro's father.

In April 2026, Navarro's mother complained that Navarro had been prevented from visiting her father for over five months, despite her being legally entitled to see him once every 45 days. The prison director of La Bellotax was alleged to have told her that there was not enough fuel to transport her to Agüica, the prison where her father was detained.

In May 2026, Navarro and her father reportedly rejected an offer to be released from prison early in exchange for leaving Cuba.

In September 2026, the European Parliament approved an urgent resolution calling for the immediate release of Navarro and her father.

== Recognition ==
Navarro is considered to be a prisoner of conscience by Amnesty International, and a political prisoner by the United States government.

In 2023, Navarro was nominated for the International Women of Courage Award.
