= Yuri Doykov =

Russian historian (born 1955)

Doykov, Yuri Vsevolodovich
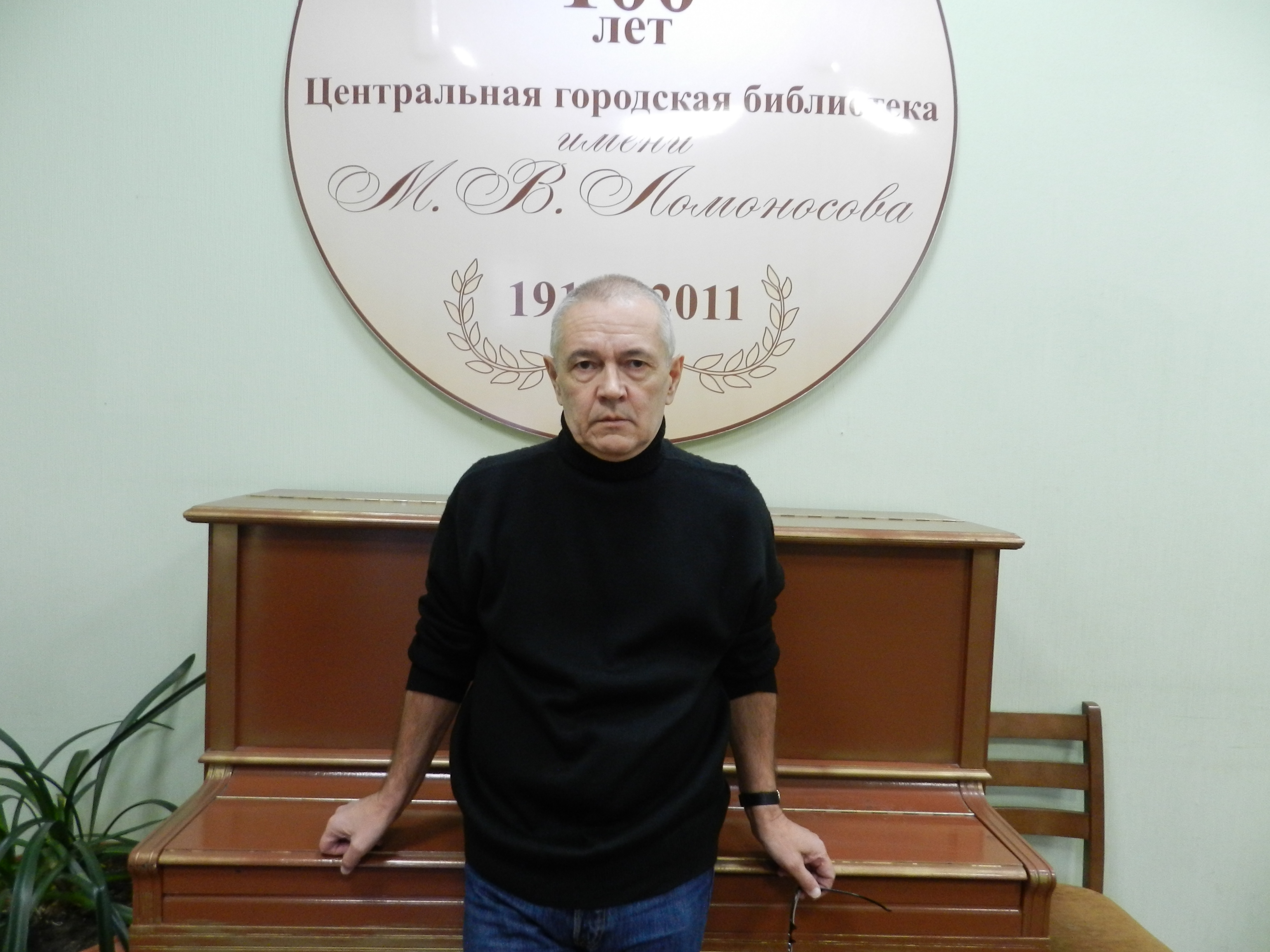
- Born: July 20, 1955 (age 71); Arkhangelsk, RSFSR, USSR
- Education: Leningrad University
- Occupations: Historian, journalist
- Writing career
- Genre: History
- Subject: Russia

Yuri Vsevolodovich Doykov (Russian: Юрий Всеволодович Дойков; born 1955) is a Russian historian.

== Biography ==
Yuri Doykov was born on July 20, 1955, in Arkhangelsk, at that time in the USSR. In 1988 he earned a Ph.D. in Russian History at Leningrad University. Since 1991, he has worked as an independent scholar in Arkhangelsk, specializing in Russia, Ukraine and Eurasia. He publishes a newsletter, Yuri Doykov's Daily, which started in 2011.

== Details about his books ==
1. Yuri Doikov defends the right of the historian on an objective assessment of the Bolshevik past of the country and its northern outskirts, the Arkhangelsk North. //Pomor Encyclopedia in five volumes, editor-in-chief N.P. Lavyorov, Academician, vice-president of Russian Academy of Science. Volume 1. History of the Arkhangelsk North. Editor-in-chief V.N. Bulatov. Compiled by A.A. Kuratov. Arkhangelsk. Pomor Federal State University named after M.N. Lomonosov. 2001. P.144.

2. "This is the odyssey of the Russian narodnik-syndicalist and popularizer of cooperatives, Andrei Andreevich Evdokimov. The author does a good job of bringing to light little-known information about his subject. He began his research with the three-volume Evdokimov case file housed in the Arkhangelsk Region Federal Security Service (FSB) archives, and he culled other sources in St. Petersburg's public library and in archives in Moscow and Ukraine". // A.A. Evdokimov: Sud’ba proroka v Rossii. By Iurii Doikov. St. Petersburg: Akropol’, 1999. 192pp. Appendix. Notes. Bibliography. Chronology. Index. Paper.

3. "Ifolge forfatteren Yuri Doikov ble om lag 200 innbyggere arrestert, mange skutt – mens andre ble sendt i fangeleir". // Opdahl, Anders. Jonas gienapner norsk konsulat I Arkhangelsk etter 72 ar. // Onsdag. 2010. 18 August. 8. 4. Shlegel, Sebastian, Jena. Jurij V. Dojkov. A.A. Evdokimov. : Sud’ba proroka v Rossii. [A.A. Evdokimov. Das Schickal eines Propheten in Rusland]. Izdat. Akropol’. S-Peterburg 1999. 190 S. // Jahrbucher fur Geschichte Osteuropas. 2004. Band 52. Helft 3.

5. Зиль, Андрій. «Не можу витерпіти чужих страждань...». 20 січня, 2006.

6. Yuri Doikov is a historian from Archangelsk, Russia, who has carried out several research projects related to Pitirim Sorokin's years in Russia. His recent book "Pitirim Sorokin in Prague" is based on ample archival materials related to the Russian emigration and diaspora in Czechoslovakia. The author has made a substantial effort to collect materials from various archives in the Czech Republic, including the Museum of National Literature, the Karlov University Archive, the Archive of the Czech Academy of Sciences, the Slavic Library, the Institute of Documentation and Investigations of Communist Crime; collections of Sergei Gessen and his sons, those of Yosef Kral, Arnost Blaha, Vladimir Kadlec, Kramarz, and private collections of Gana Vbrova-Piskachkova, Anastasiya Vukolova-Koprshiva. // The Golden Prague of Pitirim Sorokin. Written by Pavel Krotov with substantial contributions from Drs. Sergei P. Sorokin and Richard F. Hoyt

== Selected publications ==
(in chronological order)

=== Books (in Russian) ===
- Doykov, Yuri. USA, Russia, Ukraine (1917-2024). – Arhangel, 2025.
- Doykov, Yuri. Henry Kamm from the "New York" Times": Bibliography (1965-1998). - Arkhangelesk, 2024.
- Doykov, Yuri. Ukraine. Year Two... – Archangel, 2024.
- Doykov, Yuri. Why was Pitirim Sorokin silent? From the Lubyanka to Harvard (1918–1930). – Arkhangelsk, "Samizdat," 2023.
- Doykov, Yuri. Childhood in Archangel (Henry Lambton Carr). - Archangel: "Samizdat", 2023.
- Doykov, Yuri. Ukraine. 2/24.2022. - Archangel: "Samizdat", 2023.
- Doykov, Yuri. "Who are you, Dr. Shtromas?". Debriefing. - Archangel: "Samizdat", 2023.
- Andrei Amalrik. Documentary biography. — Arkhangelsk 2019
- The Memorial book: The Red Terror in the Soviet Arctic, 1920–1923: (documentaries). - Arkhangelsk 2011
- First Siberia: Biographical Dictionary of exiles of Arkhangelsk region (XII century–February 1917). Part 1. - Arkhangelsk 2011
- Candle lit ... German shadows in the Gulag of Arkhangelsk (1920–2010). Arkhangelsk 2010.
- Pitirim Sorokin in Prague (1922–1923). - Arkhangelsk 2009
- Pitirim Sorokin. Man out of season. Biography. Vol. 2. (1922–1968). - Arkhangelsk 2009
- Pitirim Sorokin. Man out of season. Biography. Vol. 1. (1889–1922). - Arkhangelsk 2008
- Arkhangelsk's shadows (FSB archives). Volume 1 (1908-1942). - Arkhangelsk 2008
- The Red Terror. Russia. Ukraine. 1917–1924. - Arkhangelsk: Documentation Center, 2008
- Chubinskiy P.P. Precursor Ukrainian freedom. - Arkhangelsk 2007 (http://diasporiana.org.ua/wp-content/uploads/books/15658/file.pdf)
- German sociologist - German Ahminov. - Arkhangelsk 2006
- Arkhangelsk Local History Society (1923-1937): payroll. - Arkhangelsk 2004
- The most famous Russian historians. - M .: Veche, 2004
- Pechersky district - Nenets National Area. The Red Terror (1918-1942). - Arkhangelsk 2003
- Killed by Arkhangelsk gubcheka (1920–1921). - Arkhangelsk 2001
- Evdokimov А. А. : the fate of the prophet in Russia. - SPb .: Acropolis 1999 (on line at https://www.sakharov-center.ru/asfcd/auth/?t=page&num=13320)
- The Red Terror in the North: the new archival documents. Vol. 1. - Arkhangelsk: Arkhang. region. com. Human Rights 1993
- Pitirim Sorokin: pages of life. - SPb.; Arkhangelsk 1992
- Yuri Doykov. Modern Thought of P.A. Sorokin. Arkhangelsk Regional Studies Museum. Emigration History Research Center. Arkhangelsk. 1995
- Jurij Dojkow. Der Deutsche Soziologe Herman Achminov. Ubersetzung aus dem Russischen von Dieter Bohm und Olaf Hartrwig. Archangelsk. 2008. - 64s (in German)

Doykov, Yuri. Operation «Convergence»: The Kremlin's Internationalists (1918-2025). A Spy's Handbook. – Arhangel: Samizdat, 2026. 120 pp. ill.

=== Editor and publisher ===
- Postnikova, Elizabeth. Notes of the revolutionary. (Arkhangelsk 2014)
- Evdokimova, Nadezhda. Memories. (Arkhangelsk 2011)
- Doikov Yu. V. Surovtsova-Olitskaya N. V. Vienna-Kolyma (1919–1939). Based on materials from the archives of the Security Service of Ukraine and L. N. Padun-Lukyanova (Kyiv), GARF (Moscow). - Arkhangelsk: Documentation Center, 2010. - 2nd ed. – 67p. Text in full posted at https://www.sakharov-center.ru/asfcd/auth/?t=page&num=13321
- Surovtseva- Olitskaya, Nadezhda. Kolyma silhouettes. (Arkhangelsk 2007)
- Postnikov, Sergey. My literary memories. (The history of the magazine. "Zavety") (Arkhangelsk 2007)
- Pirogov, Sergey. For history of the post-Stalinist camps. (Arkhangelsk 2001)
- Vilkitsky, Boris. When, how and to whom I have served under the Bolsheviks: the memories of White Guard Rear Admiral. (Arkhangelsk 2001).
- Sorokin, Pitirim. Motley lace: travel notes of 1911. (Arkhangelsk 1993)
- Smirnov, Vasily. Arkhangelsk in the early 1930s. (Saint Petersburg - Arkhangelsk 1992)

=== Bibliography ===
- Doykov, Y. For 12 years: List of publications, 1989–2000. - SPb. : Acropolis 2001
- Doykov, Y. Metaphysical Muse: bibliography (1989–2011). - Arkhangelsk 2012
