= Chris Galanos =

American pastor

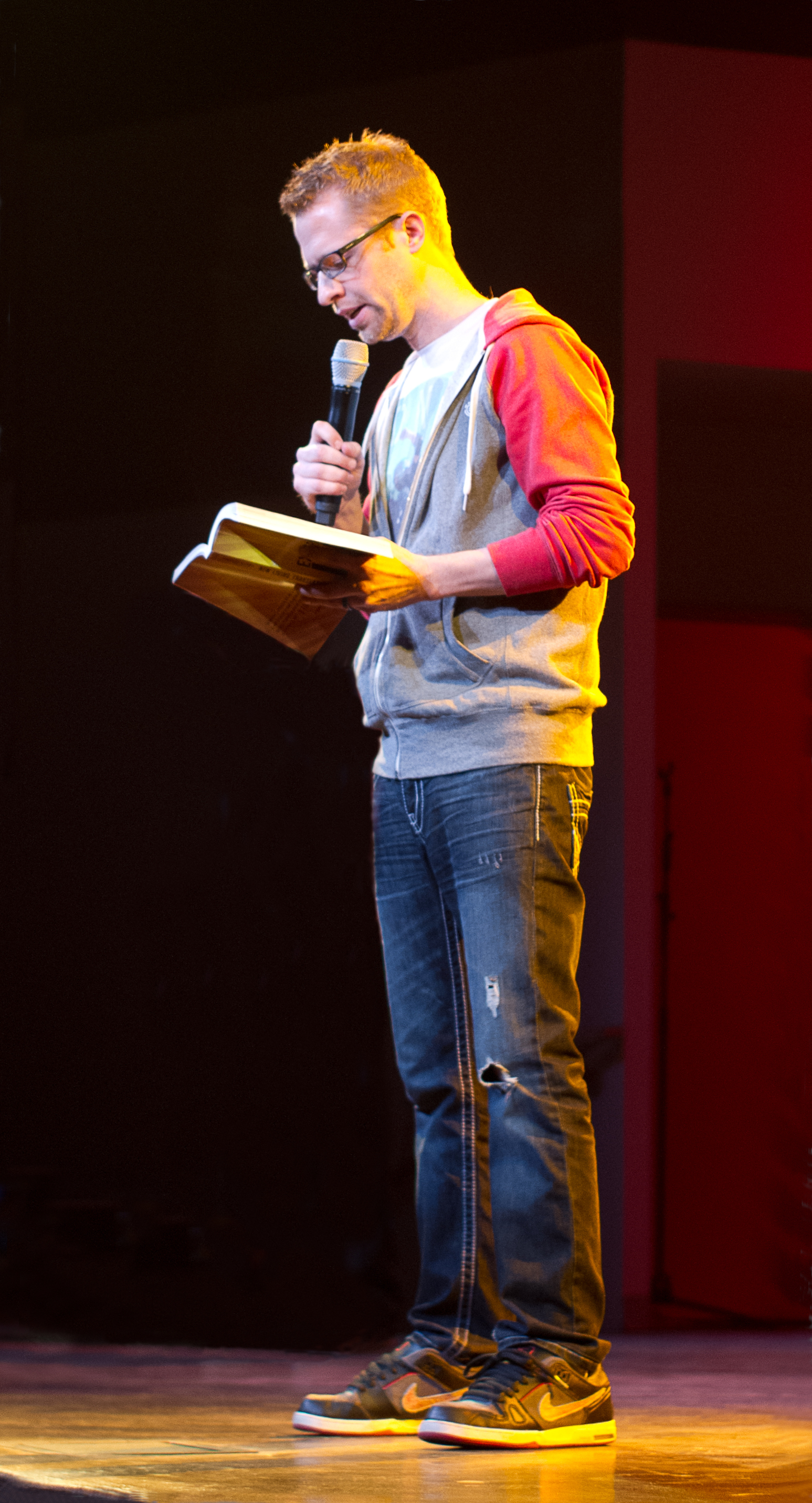
- Chris Galanos reads from the Bible in 2013
- Born: February 7, 1982 (age 44); Lubbock, Texas, United States
- Occupation: Pastor
- Spouse: Emilie Galanos
- Website: http://www.chrisgalanos.com

Chris Galanos (born February 7, 1982) was the pastor of Experience Life in Lubbock, Texas. He was named the youngest mega-church pastor in the country. The church was founded in his living room in 2007. In the fall of 2019, Experience Life supposedly started meeting in many homes across West Texas, yet they do not advertise how to attend one of these churches. Their website is focused solely on monetary donations.

== Personal life ==
During his high school years, Chris became a Microsoft Certified Professional at age 15 and a Microsoft Certified Systems Engineer at age 16.
