= Berta Soler =

Cuban dissident (born 1963)

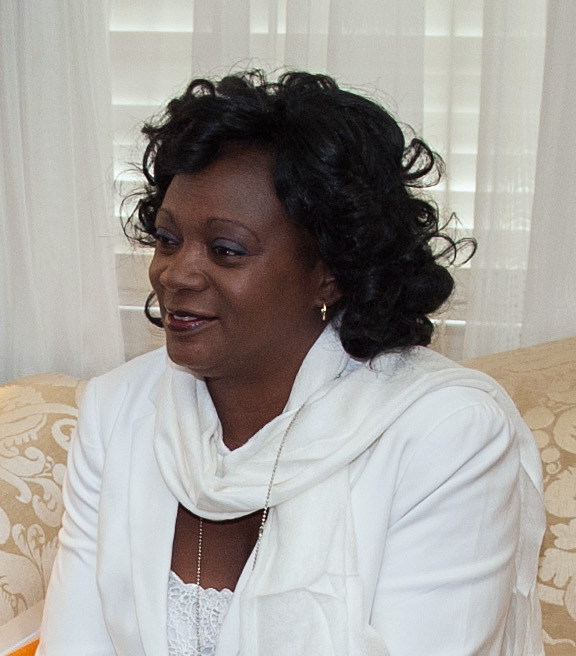
- Born: Berta de los Angeles Soler Fernandez; July 31, 1963 (age 62); Matanzas, Cuba
- Organization: Ladies in White
- Known for: Activism for political prisoners
- Spouse: Angel Moya Acosta
- Children: Luis Angel and Lienys

Berta de los Angeles Soler Fernandez (born July 31, 1963 in Matanzas, Cuba) is a Cuban dissident. She is the current leader of Ladies in White, a group originally composed of wives and female relatives of political prisoners who protested on their behalf which has since 2011 transformed into a more general human rights group open to Cuban women. She assumed leadership following the death of group founder Laura Pollan. In 2012, the Associated Press described her as "one of Cuba's leading dissidents".

== Biography ==
=== Early life ===
Soler is a former microbiology technician at a Havana hospital. She is married to Angel Moya Acosta, a construction worker and dissident, with whom she has two Children, Luis Angel and Lienys.

=== Activism ===
On March 8th 2003, Soler's husband Moya, the founder of the Alternative Option Movement, was arrested during Cuba's "Black Spring" crackdown on political dissidents in front of his wife and children. He was later sentenced to twenty years in prison.

Soler then became a founding member of the Ladies in White, a group composed of wives and female relatives of political prisoners. Each Sunday, members would dress in white and march down Havana's Fifth Avenue in protest of their husbands' continued detention.

When Moya suffered a herniated disc in October 2004, Soler began a campaign to urge the government to give him an operation, submitting a letter to President Fidel Castro on his behalf and staging a rare protest in Havana's Plaza de la Revolución with the Ladies in White. She described the protest as "my right and duty as a wife". After two days of protest, Moya was given surgery.

Soler was one of five members of the Ladies to be selected to receive the 2005 Sakharov Prize for Freedom of Thought of the European Parliament. The Cuban government barred the group's leaders from attending the Sakharov Prize award ceremony in Strasbourg, France, drawing an appeal on the group's behalf from the European Parliament.

After Moya's release in 2011 from prison, he and Soler chose to remain in Cuba and continue their calls for the release of political prisoners, despite being offered emigration to Spain.

In March 2012, Soler and Moya were detained along with three dozen other demonstrators when they staged their weekly protest ahead of a visit of Pope Benedict XVI. Soler told reporters that authorities had warned the Ladies to avoid Benedict's public appearances, including masses. She responded, "They are mistaken because who is going to prohibit us from being close to Christ, being close to God, to the pope who is represents Christ on earth?"

In 2013, seven members and former members of the Ladies in White denounced Berta Soler, accusing her of the diversion and appropriation of the funds the organization receives from the US and EU supporting governments and agencies, as well as "dictatorial" practices. Which was found to be untrue.

In September 2025, Soler received Lech Wałęsa Solidarity Prize. She was unable to attend a ceremony for political reasons. Polish Deputy Prime Minister and Minister of Foreign Affairs Radosław Sikorski handed a statuette to Irma Santos de Mas, a representative of Cuban American National Foundation.
