= Oswaldo Payá =

Cuban activist (1952–2012)

- Payá in 2012

National Coordinator of the Christian Liberation Movement
- In office 8 September 1988 – 22 July 2012
- Preceded by: Office established
- Succeeded by: Eduardo Cardet

Personal details
- Born: Oswaldo Payá Sardiñas; 29 February 1952 Havana, Cuba
- Died: 22 July 2012 (aged 60) Bayamo, Granma Province, Cuba
- Cause of death: Assassination (car crash)
- Party: Christian Liberation Movement
- Spouse: Ofelia Acevedo
- Children: 3, including Rosa María
- Education: University of Havana
- Occupation: Engineer
- Known for: Varela Project, opposition to Cuban Communist Party
- Awards: Homo Homini Award (1999); Sakharov Prize (2002)

Oswaldo Payá Sardiñas (29 February 1952 – 22 July 2012) was a Cuban engineer, activist and opposition leader. A devout Catholic, he founded the Christian Liberation Movement in 1988 to oppose the one-party rule of the Cuban Communist Party. He attracted international attention for organizing a petition drive known as the Varela Project, in which 25,000 signatories petitioned the Cuban government to guarantee freedom of speech and freedom of assembly as well as to institute a multi-party democracy. In recognition of his work, he received the European Parliament's Sakharov Prize and People in Need's Homo Homini Award.

On 22 July 2012, he was killed by the Cuban Government when the State Security rammed the car he was in. The Cuban government stated that the driver had lost control of the vehicle and collided with a tree, while Payá's children and one of the car's passengers asserted that the car had been deliberately run off of the road. In 2023, a ruling by the Inter-American Commission of Human Rights (IACHR) held the Cuban state responsible for the murder of Payá.

== Early life ==
Oswaldo Payá was born on 29 February 1952 in Cerro, Havana. The fifth of seven children, he was brought up as a Roman Catholic and attended a Marist Brothers school in Havana. Payá was the only student at the school who refused to join the Communist League following the Cuban Revolution. The school was later closed. In 1969, he was sentenced to three years of hard labor on Isla de Pinos when he refused to transport political prisoners during his mandatory military service. While there, he discovered a locked Catholic church, Nuestra Señora de Dolores, that received permission from the Bishop of Havana to reopen as a mission, giving religious talks and caring for the sick.

After his release, Payá enrolled in the University of Havana as a physics major, but was expelled when authorities discovered him to be a practicing Christian; he then attended night school and switched his major to telecommunications. Payá later became an engineer and worked at a state surgical-equipment company. He was offered an opportunity to leave Cuba in the 1980 Mariel boatlift, but chose to remain in Cuba and work for change. He married Ofelia Acevedo in 1986 in a Catholic wedding. The pair had three children: Oswaldo José, Rosa María, and Reinaldo Isaías.

== Career ==
=== Varela Project ===
In 1988, Payá founded the Christian Liberation Movement (MCL), which called for nonviolent civil disobedience against the rule of the Cuban Communist Party. The group advocates for civil liberties and freedom for political prisoners. He also began a magazine for Catholics titled People of God (Pueblo de Dios), calling for Christians to lead the struggle for human rights. However, the magazine was shut down the following year by Cuba's bishops under government pressure. Payá attempted to run for the National Assembly of People's Power (NAPP) in 1992, but was not allowed to stand.

In the late 1990s, Payá and other MCL activists began collecting signatures for the Varela Project, a petition drive that would become his best-known program. Named in honor of Félix Varela, a Catholic priest who had participated in Cuba's independence struggle with Spain, the Project took advantage of a clause in the Cuban Constitution requiring a national referendum to be held if 11,000 signatures are gathered.

In May 2002, Payá presented NAPP with 11,020 signatures calling for a referendum on safeguarding freedom of speech and assembly, allowing private business ownership, and ending one-party rule. On 3 October 2003, he delivered an additional 14,000 signatures. Former U.S. president Jimmy Carter endorsed the petition when granted a chance to speak on Cuban television, bringing Payá's efforts to the attention of a wide Cuban audience. Cuban President Fidel Castro described the petition drive as a U.S.-backed conspiracy to overthrow his government.

According to the Los Angeles Times, the petition drive was "the biggest nonviolent campaign to change the system the elder Castro established after the 1959 Cuban revolution", giving Payá an international reputation as a leading dissident. An expert described it as "the only initiative of its time that enlisted citizen participation on a large scale". Fellow dissident Rene Gomez Manzano, on the other hand, was critical of the Project, stating that appeals to the Communist-Party-controlled NAPP were futile; similarly, other Cuban exiles criticized the initiative for what they considered its implicit acceptance of the legitimacy of the Castro regime and its constitution.

Later that year, Payá's efforts were recognized by the European Parliament, which awarded him its Sakharov Prize for Freedom of Thought, although he was nearly denied an exit visa to attend the awards ceremony. In the months that followed, Payá met with Pope John Paul II, U.S. Secretary of State Colin Powell, and Mexican President Vicente Fox to discuss the cause of Cuban democratic reform. The Varela Project progress was blocked when the government launched its own petition drive to declare the socialist state "irrevocable". During the 2003 crackdown popularly known as the Black Spring, MCL members comprised around 40 of the 75 defendants, though Payá himself was not arrested.

=== Later activism ===
During Castro's illness, which culminated in his 2008 resignation, Payá continued to criticize the Cuban government as it transferred power to Castro's brother Raúl. He called on Raul Castro to allow multiparty elections and free all political prisoners, and delivered a petition asking that the Cuban people be granted freedom of travel.

In the years before Payá's death, his influence was said to be waning, and attention shifted to younger activists such as blogger Yoani Sanchez. Leaked diplomatic cables from Jonathan D. Farrar, head of the U.S. Interests Section in Havana, described Payá and other older dissidents as "hopelessly out of touch", writing, "They have little contact with younger Cubans and, to the extent they have a message that is getting out, it does not appeal to that segment of society." However, many of the younger generation of dissidents cited him as a role model and expressed grief at his death.

== Political views ==
=== Opposition to United States groups and policy ===
Payá refused to accept U.S. aid and also opposed the U.S. Cuban embargo. In a 2000 editorial for the Miami Herald, he stated that "Lifting the embargo won't solve the problems of the Cuban people. Maintaining it is no solution, either". He called on the U.S. to immediately lift the embargo on food and medicine.

He also maintained his distance from Cuban political groups based in the U.S. In particular, he refused to support their stated goal of land reacquisition upon the return of exiles to Cuba:

"It is not a neoliberal programme. For this, we are under attack by the powerful groups in Miami. When people say what is going to happen in Cuba after Fidel, we say – hold on, there are 11 million people in Cuba, not only Fidel Castro."

=== Opposition to government cooperation ===
In 2005, he also feuded with democracy activist Marta Beatriz Roque, accusing her of collaborating with security forces to provide justification for a further crackdown. Although his political activity was tolerated and on a few occasions he was allowed to travel abroad, Payá reported that both he and his family were subject to routine intimidation: "I have been told that I am going to be killed before the regime is over but I am not going to run away."

== Death ==
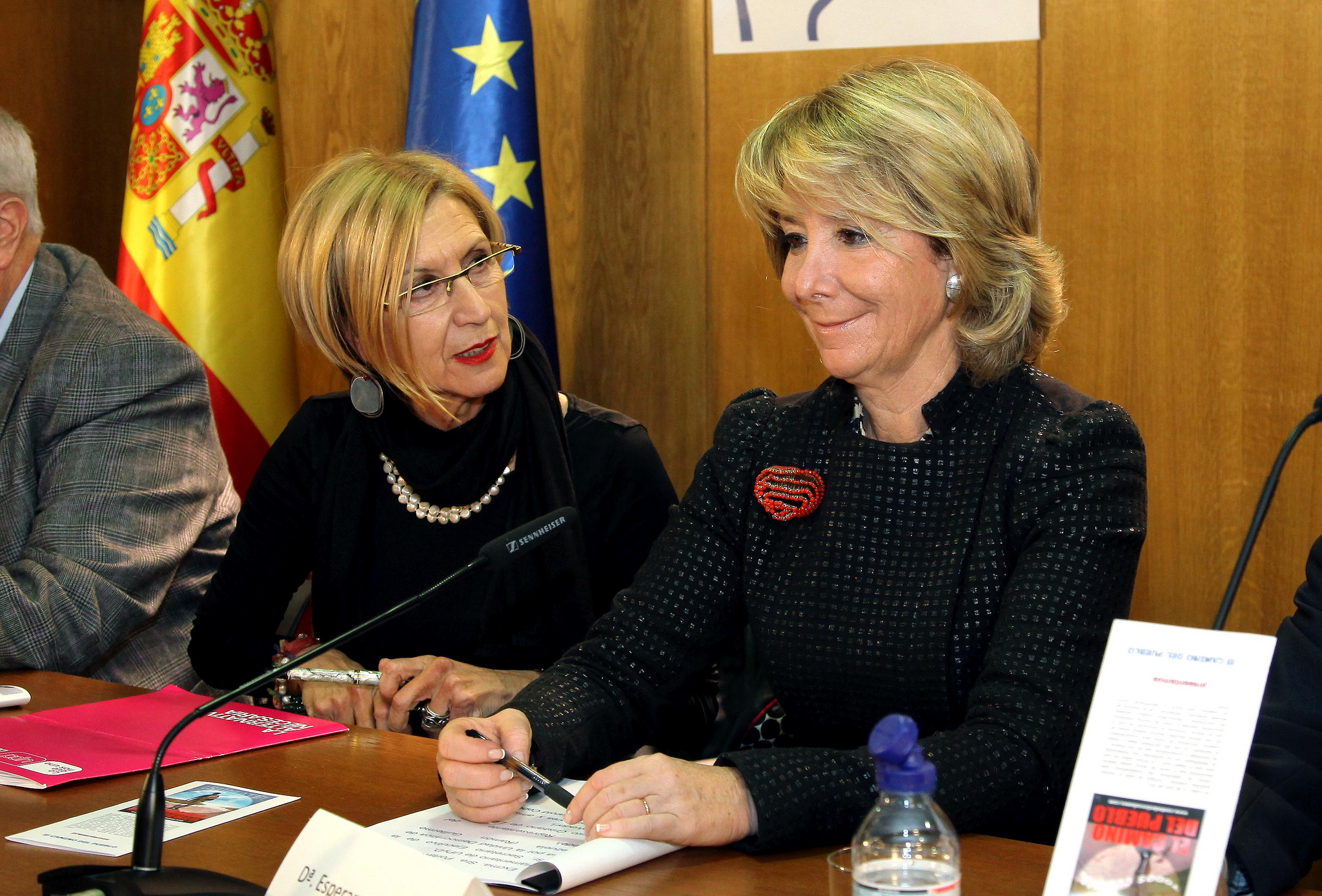
Spanish politicians Rosa Díez and Esperanza Aguirre at a tribute event for Payá.

Payá died in a car crash on 22 July 2012 at the age of 60. The incident occurred at 1:50 p.m. near Bayamo in eastern Granma province, according to a statement released by the Cuban government's International Press Center. The chairman of the MCL's youth league, Harold Cepero, also died in the crash. Swedish politician and chairman of the Young Christian Democrats Aron Modig and Spanish politician Ángel Carromero Barrios were present, but survived with minor injuries. All four were taken to Professor Carlos Manuel Clinical Surgery Hospital in Bayamo, though Payá was dead on arrival. The car was driven by Carromero, well known in his country through his numerous but minor violations of traffic laws. In late February 2014, the High Court of Spain upheld the decision of Judge Eloy Velasco, taken in September 2013, not to accept the complaint filed by the family of Oswaldo Payá against two senior Cuban military officers for the death of Payá. Carromero went on trial in Cuba, where he was convicted of non-planned murder.

At a press conference arranged by Cuban authorities on 30 July, Modig and Carromero stated that the crash was an accident and no other car was involved. Speaking in 2013 to the Washington Post, Carromero denied this version of events, stating that he had been drugged and threatened by Cuban authorities who had forced him to make a false statement. He stated instead that the car had been rammed by another vehicle with Cuban government license plates, causing the fatal crash.

Payá's daughter Rosa María stated that her father died after the rental car in which he was traveling was rammed several times by another car. Payá's son Oswaldo added that his father had received numerous death threats and stated that the accident's survivors had reported that the car had been deliberately driven off the road. The official statement by the Cuban government stated that the driver lost control of the vehicle and collided with a tree. The MCL stated that "the circumstances of these deaths have not been cleared up and are open to hypothesis" and demanded a "transparent" inquiry into the accident. On 27 July, the Cuban Interior Ministry forwarded an official report to foreign press, blaming driver error and quoting Carromero as saying that the car had skidded off the road due to poor road conditions and bad weather. Payá's widow rejected the report, stating that the crash was not an accident and that a government report could not be trusted.

U.S. President Barack Obama released a statement praising Payá as "a tireless champion for greater civic and human rights in Cuba". U.S. Senator Marco Rubio and Republican presidential candidate Mitt Romney called for an independent investigation into the crash, imploring the international community to "demand that the facts concerning Paya's death be accurately determined and that the surviving witnesses be protected". The European Union issued a statement recognizing Payá's dedication "to the cause of democracy and human rights in Cuba". Elizardo Sanchez, president of the Cuban Commission for Human Rights, stated that "This is tragic for the family and the human rights and pro-democracy movement in Cuba ... Payá was considered the most notable political leader of the Cuban opposition." Ladies in White president Berta Soler described the death as "a terrible blow".

Payá's funeral was held on 24 July 2012. Dissident groups reported that dozens of activists were arrested on their way to the funeral, including Félix Navarro Rodríguez and Guillermo Fariñas. A scuffle also broke out between activists and state security agents at the funeral itself. Amnesty International and the U.S. criticized the arrests, with the White House describing them as "a stark demonstration of the climate of repression in Cuba." The dissidents arrested in Payá's funerals were freed the following day.

In June 2023, the Inter-American Commission of Human Rights (IACHR) ruled that the Cuban state was responsible for the murder of Oswaldo Payá and Harold Cepero, concluding that "there were serious and sufficient indications to conclude that State agents directly participated in the deaths of Payá and Cepero", as well as responsible for violations of the due process right to and judicial guarantees of Ángel Carromero.

Oswaldo Payá's daughter Rosa Maria has continued his activism for democratic reforms in Cuba.

== Awards and recognition ==
- The Homo Homini Award of People in Need, a Czech NGO, 1999
- The Sakharov Prize for Freedom of Thought of the European Parliament, 2002
- W. Averell Harriman Democracy Award from U.S. National Democratic Institute for International Affairs, 2003
- Honorary Doctor of Laws degree from Columbia University in New York, 2005
- Nominated for the Nobel Peace Prize by the former Czech President Václav Havel, with fellow Cuban dissidents Raul Rivero and Óscar Elías Biscet

== See also ==
- Heinrich Maier
- Grigoris Lambrakis, Greek democratic activist who was assassinated in 1963 in the Kingdom of Greece (present-day Greece)
- Christian Democracy
- Censorship in Cuba
- Human rights in Cuba
