= Clemente Galano =

Italian theologian (1610–1666)

Clemente Galano (Latin: Clementis Galanus; 1610 – 14 May 1666) was an Italian Theatine missionary, theologian, and Armenologist. He preached Catholicism among Armenians and played an important role in bringing the Armenian community of Poland into unity with Rome. He wrote a number of works in Armenian and Latin, including a grammar of Armenian (Grammatica), published in 1645.

== Biography ==
Clemente Galano was born in Sorrento in 1610. He became a member of the Theatine order and devoted much of his missionary activity to Armenian communities, most of whom belonged, as they do today, to their own non-Chalcedonian national church. From 1636 to 1641, he preached in Georgia. In 1641, he moved to Constantinople where besides preaching he also worked as a teacher and apothecary. He founded a school in Constantinople where he instructed Armenian students in religion and languages, including Armenian. From 1648 to 1663, he taught Armenian and other subjects at the Armenian college (Collegio Armeno) of the Pontificio Collegio Urbano de Propaganda Fide.

Galano was sent by the Propaganda Fide to Lwów to found an Armenian Catholic seminary there and to reduce the influence of the Armenian archbishop Nikol Torosowicz. Torosowicz had caused the Armenian community of Poland to recognize the supremacy of Rome. However, he pursued a dual policy between the Catholic and Armenian churches and was distrusted by Rome. In 1664, Galano founded the Armenian Seminary College in Lwów and served as its first prefect. He remained in this position until his sudden death in 1666.

== Works ==
Galano wrote a number of works, some manuscript and some printed, in Latin and Armenian. In 1645, he published a textbook on logic in Armenian. It was the first such Armenian work to appear in print and helped to develop the study of logic as a separate discipline in Armenian scholarship. That same year, his grammar of Classical Armenian appeared. Galano analyzed Armenian grammar through the lens of Latin grammar. Galano also wrote the work Conciliationis ecclesiae Armenae cum Romana ex ipsis armenorum patrum et doctorum testimoniis in duas partes (The union of the Armenian Church with the Roman Church according to the Armenian fathers and teachers, in two parts), which appeared in two volumes (volume two has two parts) from 1650 to 1661. In this work, Galano used Armenian, Greek and Latin sources to narrate Armenian history and advocate for the unity of the Armenian church with Rome. Galano has been accused of falsifying information about Armenian political and church history in this work. The work is important as a primary source, as it made use of sources which have since been lost.
