= Félix Navarro Rodríguez =

Cuban farmer, teacher, and dissident

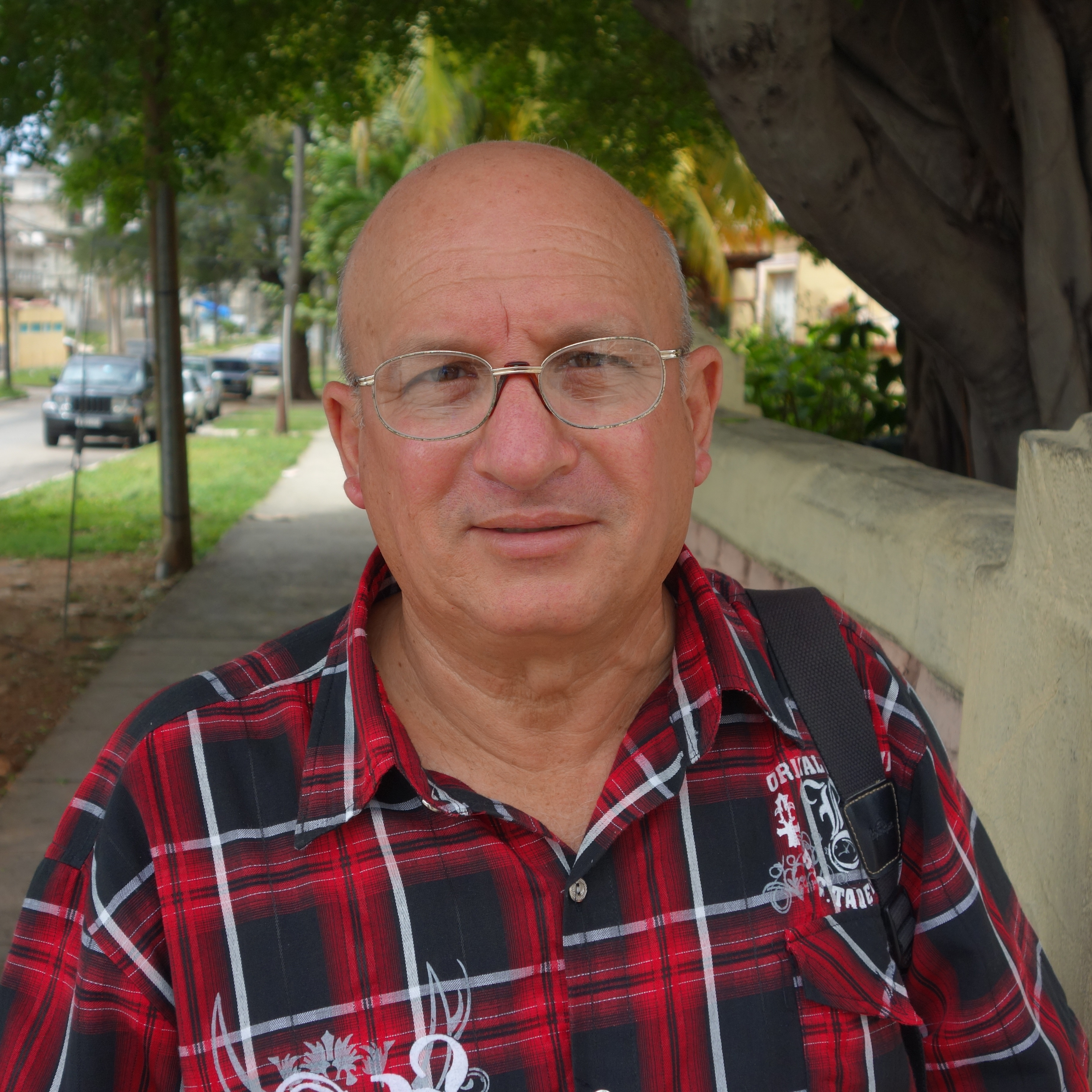
- Born: Perico, Matanzas Province, Cuba
- Occupations: farmer, teacher
- Known for: dissident politics, 2003-2011 imprisonment
- Children: Saylí Navarro

Félix Navarro Rodríguez (born c. 1955) is a Cuban farmer, teacher, and dissident from Perico, Matanzas Province.

On 18 March 2003, he was arrested as part of the Black Spring, a general crackdown by the Cuban government on pro-democracy groups. He was sentenced to fifty years in prison at Guantánamo, leading Amnesty International to name him a prisoner of conscience. In October 2005, he joined a hunger strike with other imprisoned dissidents, leading students at Florida International University to stage a fast as a show of solidarity.

Navarro remained in prison until 2011. He and Jose Daniel Ferrer Garcia were released on 23 March 2011 as part of an agreement between the Cuban government and the Catholic Church. They were the last two prisoners of the Black Spring to be released. In a statement to Reuters, Navarro announced his intention to pursue the "continue the peaceful, not violent struggle" for democracy.

On 24 July 2012, he was one of dozens of activists arrested in Havana at the funeral of dissident Oswaldo Payá. Amnesty International and the U.S. criticized the arrests, with the White House describing them as "a stark demonstration of the climate of repression in Cuba." The dissidents were freed the following day.

Navarro was arrested again following protests in 2021 alongside his daughter Saylí Navarro but was released in January 2025 as part of an agreement between the Cuban government and the United States. He was rearrested in April 2025 after his paroles was revoked.
