= Luis Enrique Ferrer García =

Cuban dissident

Luis Enrique Ferrer García is a Cuban dissident.

He was arrested during the Black Spring in 2003 and received a 28-year sentence for his work with the Varela project, a civic initiative calling for democratic reforms in Cuba.

Upon leaving the courtroom, a member of the mob struck Luis Enrique Ferrer García with a hammer, and his mother and sister were violently thrown to the ground.

To protest his unjust imprisonment, especially severe prison conditions and mistreatment by prison authorities, Ferrer García has engaged in numerous hunger strikes throughout his detention, often leaving him very ill and weak. He was the victim of numerous physical assaults by security guards and violent prisoners. According to Human Rights First, attacks are believed to be encouraged by prison authorities to harass and intimidate him.

Ferrer Garcia was freed in November 2010 and exiled with his family.

Garcia is the official representative of the Cuban Patriotic Union UNPACU outside of Cuba, the same organization that Wilmar Villar Mendoza belonged to. His brother, Jose Daniel Ferrer Garcia is the founder and official representative of UNPACU inside the island.

He spoke at the Geneva Summit for Human Rights and Democracy in March 2011 on the subject of "The Right Against Arbitrary Arrest".
