= Ivonne Malleza Galano =

Cuban democracy activist

- Organization: Ladies in White
- Known for: democracy activism, 2011-12 imprisonment
- Spouse: Ignacio Martínez Montejo

Ivonne Malleza Galano is a Cuban democracy activist who was imprisoned in 2011 by the Cuban government. Amnesty International designated her a prisoner of conscience.

== Background ==
Malleza is a member of Ladies in White, an opposition movement in Cuba consisting of wives and other female relatives of jailed political prisoners. Since its 2003 inception, the movement has been repeatedly harassed by security officials as an illegal political organization, the Cuban Communist Party being Cuba's only legal organization.

== Arrest ==
At a protest in Havana on November 30, 2010, Malleza was arrested along with her husband Ignacio Martínez Montejo. She and her husband were holding a banner reading "Stop hunger, misery and poverty in Cuba" in Havana's Fraternity Park. Two police officers confiscated the banner, handcuffed her and Martínez, and put them into a police vehicle as a surrounding crowd demanded their release. When onlooker and fellow protester Isabel Haydee Alvarez Mosqueda objected to their arrest, she was detained as well. Malleza and Alvarez were both transferred to Havana's Manto Negro women’s jail. The three prisoners were held without charge, though their relatives were told the three were being investigated for "public disorder".

The three arrests were denounced by numerous human rights groups, including the Havana-based Cuban Commission of Human Rights and National Reconciliation, which described the three prisoners as "three people who simply staged a small peaceful protest on the streets without any kind of force or violence". Amnesty International named the three prisoners of conscience and called for their immediate and unconditional release. The Irish-based organization Front Line called for their release on 15 December 2011. On 13 January 2012, US Representatives Ileana Ros-Lehtinen, Mario Díaz-Balart, Albio Sires, and David Rivera issued a bipartisan statement urging the prisoners' release, calling their detention "appalling and unjust". US Senators Marco Rubio and Robert Menendez also issued a statement calling for their release and condemning the "unrelenting tyranny" of "the Castro brothers".

== Release ==
Malleza, Martínez, and Alvarez were released on 20 January after 52 days in prison; the release came only a few hours after Amnesty International's announcement of their "prisoner of conscience" designation. The organization reported that authorities told the three that they would face "harsh sentences" if they continued their anti-government activities.

In 2012, she was a finalist for the Front Line Award for Human Rights Defenders at Risk, which ultimately went to Syrian blogger Razan Ghazzawi.
