= Ángel Carromero =

Spanish politician

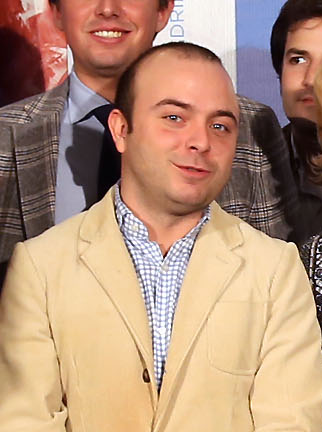
Esperanza Aguirre with members of the PP of Rivas

Ángel Francisco Carromero Barrios is the secretary general of the Madrid regional branch of the Spanish People's Party's youth organisation Nuevas Generaciones.

He served a four-year prison sentence in Spain handed to him in Cuba for the involuntary manslaughter of Cuban dissidents Oswaldo Payá and Harold Cepero. However, a 2023 ruling by the Inter-American Commission of Human Rights (IACHR) held the Cuban state responsible for the murder of Oswaldo Payá.

== Detention in relation to the death of Oswaldo Payá ==
27-year-old Ángel Francisco Carromero was detained by Cuban authorities immediately following the July 22, 2012 vehicular deaths of political dissidents Oswaldo Payá and Harold Cepero, both of whom were passengers in a car that collided with a tree. Ángel Carromero, a Spanish political operative who was driving the rented vehicle at the time of the accident, received non-life-threatening injuries; Jens Aron Modig, a Swedish politician who was also a passenger in the car, was similarly injured in a non-life-threatening way. The road the car was on has been described by news sources as being "in the process of repair, covered in abundant gravel, and, therefore, very skiddy;" following an investigation, officials declared that Carromero was speeding and failed to heed traffic signs warning of construction ahead. The accident occurred on kilometer 724 of the Las Tunas-Bayamo road, near the city of Bayamo.

The Cuban government accused Ángel Carromero of illegally financing Cuban government-opposition groups. Manslaughter charges were levied against Carromero for the two vehicular deaths, with Cuban authorities asserting that in a case such as his, in which negligent actions resulted in "grave consequences," Article 177 of the Criminal Code required a maximum sentence of 10 years imprisonment. For their part, the family of Oswaldo Payá did not file charges against Carromero; furthermore, they have stated, on various occasions, their suspicions vis-a-vis the Cuban government and its purportedly oppressive machinations against them and other dissidents, and, especially, against the late Oswaldo Payá, machinations which, the family claims, may have in some way contributed to the latter's death.

Carromero's trial in Cuba began and ended on October 5, 2012. The Cuban Attorney General's office sought to impose a penalty of seven years in prison for Carromero, however, he was ultimately given a sentence of four years, which, owing to a bilateral convention on the execution of sentences existing between Cuba and Spain, could be served in the latter country. Ángel Carromero arrived in Spain on December 29, 2012, and was temporarily held at the Centro Penitenciario de Segovia. Beginning in mid-January 2013 he served the remainder of his sentence under open-regime detention: At first he had to spend the nights from Monday to Thursday in a supervised reintegration center in Madrid. During working days, he was able to move freely and follow his daytime work, and was allowed to spend the weekends at his own home. In mid-February 2013 he was granted additional freedom of movement by way of an ankle monitor, making the overnight stays at his reintegration center unnecessary.

According to Spanish media reports in late January 2014, Carromero was preparing the publication of a book with further details about his experience in Cuba.

== Driving record as a topic of incorrect media reports ==
In April 2012, three months before Carromero travelled to Cuba, the Spanish Directorate General of Traffic had initiated the administrative process of revoking his driver's license and issued the due public notice on May 18. The withdrawal did not take effect until after the process was completed and the official withdrawal notice was published on August 9, 2012. The withdrawal procedure was the consequence of two traffic offenses since Carromero had acquired his license: A speeding violation from August 18, 2009, cost him 6 of his 8 total credit points as a novice driver under the Spanish points system, before he finally lost the remaining points for a single offense of speaking with a mobile phone in his hand while driving. The speeding ticket was for riding at 145 km/h on the Madrid–Valencia motorway with a speed limit of 120 km/h. The fine was aggravated by the fact that, as a novel driver in his second year, Carromero was to keep below a general maximum speed of 90 km/h. Carromero's driving record was incorrectly reported by various Spanish media starting in early August 2012 while he was held in solitary confinement in a cell at the "100 y Aldabó" police headquarters in Havana awaiting trial. Some newspaper reports claimed he had already lost his licence as a consequence of various instances of careless driving. His mother in Madrid immediately appealed to the media in an open letter, stating her son's licence was still valid, and asking journalists to refrain from publishing speculative and incorrect information or from investigating confidential private data, and urging the media to use prudence, respect and responsibility. Various media reports mentioned a total of over 40 traffic fines since 2009, without stating that public documentation only existed for parking tickets which were of no relevance to the status of his driver's licence. His friends, according to various news media, described him as being "the very figure of Prudence when behind the wheel of a car." According to statements to media by his friend, head of Nuevas Generaciones for Madrid and MP Pablo Casado, after visiting Carromero in jail a few days after his return from Cuba, Carromero was considering asking for a formal investigation into who had leaked the information about his traffic fines including confidential data to the press. Casado underlined that of the 45 reported fines, 43 were parking tickets, and that Carromero had lost the credit points of his driving licence for a single incident of speeding in 2009 and a later incident of talking on his mobile phone. According to Casado, Carromero also wanted to know to what end the information was leaked and explained that it had had the effect of complicating his judicial process in Cuba after the Cuban authorities had become aware of the reports published in Spain and based their prosecution on his alleged record of reckless driving. The question of how and why various media, including reputable newspapers such as El País and El Mundo, had claimed various speeding offenses was not resolved.

== University studies ==
Ángel Carromero studied at the Comillas Pontifical University, double-majoring in Law and Business Administration during three of four years. He subsequently obtained a law degree at the Catholic University of Ávila and is still finishing his degree in Business Administration. He also took courses in Banking and International Relations at Fordham University in New York City.

== Professional roles and positions ==
- Sole administrator of the company Lostic Investment, a position which was transferred to his mother, Isabel Barrios Díez, on March 15, 2010
- Secretary-General of the New Generations of the People's Party in Madrid (NNGG) since October 2013
- President of NNGG District of Salamanca
- Advisor to councilwoman for the district of Moratalaz, Begoña Larraínzar Zaballa.
