= Ladies in White =

Cuban opposition movement

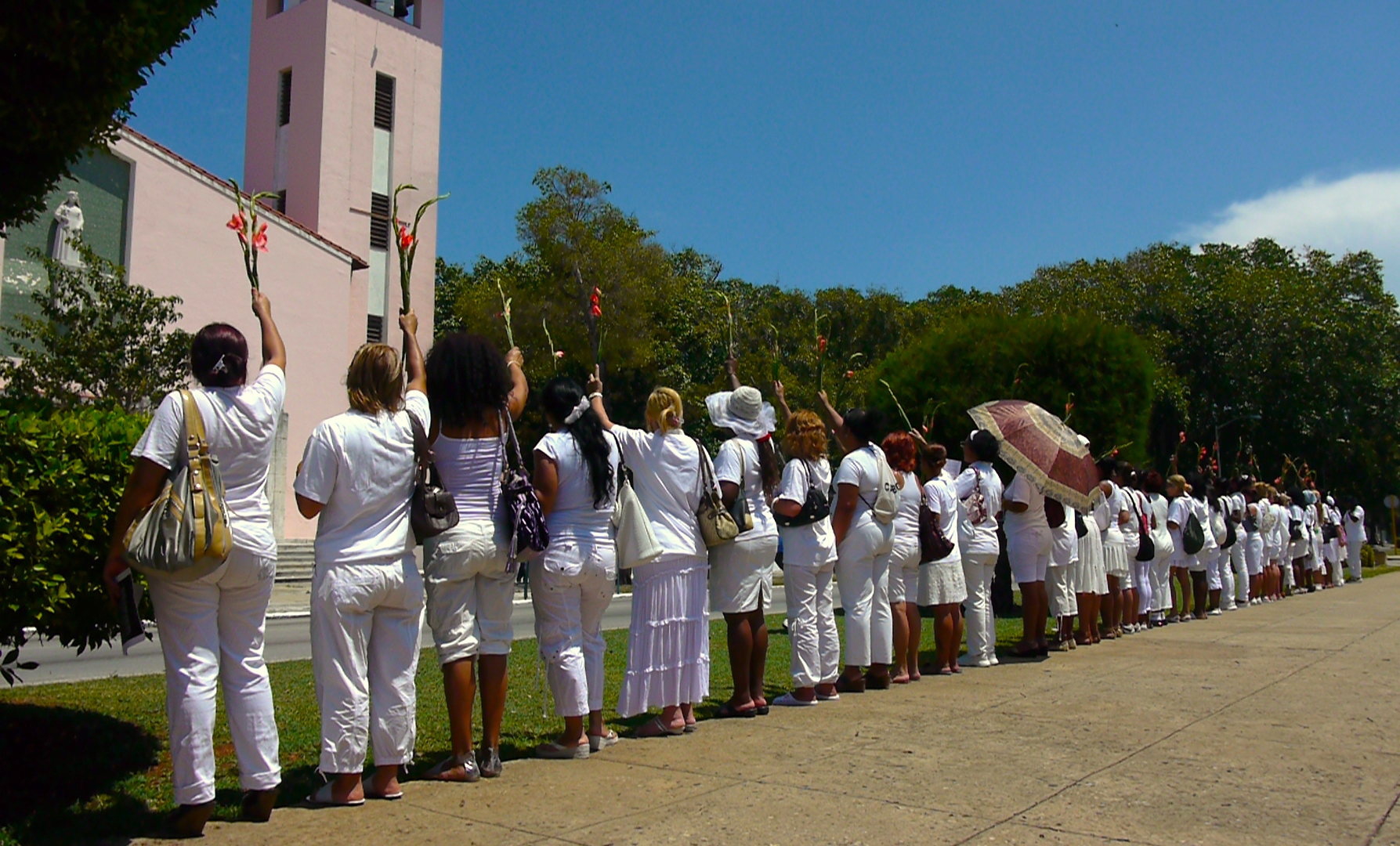
Ladies in White demonstration in Havana (April 2012)

Ladies in White (Spanish: Damas de Blanco) is an opposition movement in Cuba founded in 2003 by wives and other female relatives of jailed dissidents and those who have been made to disappear by the government. The women protest the imprisonments by attending Mass each Sunday wearing white dresses and then silently walking through the streets dressed in white clothing. The color white is chosen to symbolize peace.

The movement received the Sakharov Prize for Freedom of Thought from the European Parliament in 2005.

== Origins ==
During the Black Spring in 2003, the Cuban government arrested and summarily tried and sentenced 75 human rights activists, independent journalists, and independent librarians to terms of up to 28 years in prison, for receiving American government funds and collaborating with U.S diplomats.

For its part, the Cuban government accused the 75 individuals of "acts against the independence or the territorial integrity of the state", including belonging to "illegal organizations", accepting money from the United States Interests Section in Havana and of "hijacking", "terrorist activities", and collaborating with foreign media. In the view of the Committee to Protect Journalists, the Black Spring violated the most basic norms of international law, including Article 19 of the International Covenant on Civil and Political Rights, which guarantees everyone the right to "seek, receive, and impart information and ideas of all kinds, regardless of frontiers, either orally, in writing or in print, in the form of art, or through any other media of their choice."

Under the leadership of Laura Pollán, the Ladies in White group was formed two weeks after the arrests. Relatives of the prisoners began gathering on Sundays at St. Rita's Church in Havana to pray for their relatives. After each Mass, they began a ritual procession from the church to a nearby park. The white clothing they wear is reminiscent of the Argentine Mothers of the Plaza de Mayo, who used a similar strategy to demand information about their missing children from the 1970s military junta. Each marcher wears a button with a photo of her imprisoned relative and the number of years to which he has been sentenced.

The Cuban government has criticized the Ladies in White for being a subversive association of American-backed terrorists. On Palm Sunday in 2005, the pro-government Federation of Cuban Women sent 150 women to counter-protest the group.

At times, rather large mobs have attacked these Ladies in White, yelling insults and slurs at them, and assisting the police to throw them into imprisonment buses. However, following the 2010 intervention of Cardinal Jaime Lucas Ortega y Alamino on their behalf, they were generally allowed to protest outside of his church.

== The Sakharov Prize ==
In 2005, the Sakharov Prize for Freedom of Thought was awarded jointly to Reporters without Borders, Nigerian human rights lawyer Huawa Ibrahim, and the Ladies in White. Five of the leaders of the movement were selected to receive the prize: Laura Pollán, whose husband Hector Maseda is serving a 20-year sentence; Miriam Leiva, whose husband Oscar Espinosa Chepe has been conditionally released due to a serious illness; Berta Soler, whose husband Angel Moya Acosta is serving 20 years; Loida Valdes, whose husband Alfredo Felipe Fuentes was sentenced to 26 years; and Julia Núñez, whose husband Adolfo Fernández Saínz is serving 15 years. Some of the women were prevented from visiting their husbands to tell them of the award, but Laura Pollán told the Wall Street Journal that those who were told "are very happy and very proud".

The Cuban government barred the group's leaders from attending the Sakharov Prize award ceremony in Strasbourg, Alsace, Grand Est, France, drawing an appeal on the group's behalf from the European Parliament.

Berta Soler received the award on the organization's behalf on her first-ever trip abroad in 2013. She was allowed to leave due to Cuba easing its travel regulations.

== Support from U.S. government ==
The Cuban government alleges that the Ladies in White were created and financially sustained by the U.S. government as a means of destabilizing Cuba. Although it is unclear if the United States had a role in creating the organization, leaked classified diplomatic cables show that the U.S. Interests Section requested funding for the Ladies in White and that working with the group figures prominently in the section’s activities.

== 2010 arrests ==
At a protest in Havana on November 30, 2010, group member Ivonne Malleza Galano was arrested along with her husband Ignacio Martínez Montejo. She and her husband were holding a banner reading "Stop hunger, misery and poverty in Cuba" in Havana's Fraternity Park. Two police officers confiscated the banner, handcuffed her and Martínez, and put them into a police vehicle as a surrounding crowd demanded their release. When onlooker and fellow protester Isabel Haydee Alvarez Mosqueda objected to their arrest, she was detained as well. Malleza and Alvarez were both transferred to Havana's Manto Negro women’s jail. The three prisoners were held without charge, though their relatives were told the three were being investigated for "public disorder".

The three arrests were denounced by numerous human rights groups, including the Havana-based Cuban Commission of Human Rights and National Reconciliation, which described the three prisoners as "three people who simply staged a small peaceful protest on the streets without any kind of force or violence". Amnesty International named the three prisoners of conscience and called for their immediate and unconditional release. The Irish-based organization Front Line called for their release on 15 December 2011. On 13 January 2012, US Representatives Ileana Ros-Lehtinen, Mario Díaz-Balart, Albio Sires, and David Rivera issued a bipartisan statement urging the prisoners' release, calling their detention "appalling and unjust". US Senators Marco Rubio and Robert Menendez also issued a statement calling for their release and condemning the "unrelenting tyranny" of "the Castro brothers".

Malleza, Martínez, and Alvarez were released on 20 January after 52 days in prison; the release came only a few hours after Amnesty International's announcement of their "prisoner of conscience" designation. The organization reported that authorities told the three that they would face "harsh sentences" if they continued their anti-government activities.

The Ladies in White also participated in a vigil for imprisoned dissident Wilmar Villar Mendoza, who later died while on hunger strike.

== 2012 arrests ==
Roughly seventy members of the Ladies in White were detained on the weekend of 16–17 March 2012, including Berta Soler, the group's current leader. Many of them were arrested on their way to or from mass, which they customarily attend together before their Sunday protest march. All seventy were released without charges on 19 March. However, they were instructed by Cuba's secret police that they would no longer be allowed to protest.

A reporter for BBC News stated that protest groups like the Ladies in White were seeking to raise their profile in advance of an impending visit by Pope Benedict XVI—who was expected to discuss the issue of human rights with the Cuban government—and that the Cuban Communist Party was accordingly seeking to clamp down on protest.

On 21 March, Amnesty International designated imprisoned Ladies in White member Yasmin Conyedo Riveron and her husband Yusmani Rafael Alvarez Esmori as prisoners of conscience. The two had been arrested in January and charged with "violence against a state official" following an argument with a local Communist Party official. The pair were released on bail on 5 April.

On 9 December, police in Cuba arrested approximately 80 Ladies in White, allegedly using violence in detaining some of them. In all, 100 to 150 dissidents were placed under house arrest.

== 2015 arrests ==
In February 2015, 53 members of Ladies in White were arrested after a march through Havana after a mass.

== 2016 arrests ==
Hours before the historic visit of President Barack Obama to Cuba on 19 March, Cuban authorities arrested more than 50 members of Ladies in White during their weekly march. Some members believed Cuban authorities would allow them to protest without getting arrested due to the presence of international reporters and a foreign head of state.

Soler offered the following thoughts prior to being arrested: "For us, it's very important that we do this so President Obama knows that there are women here fighting for the liberty of political prisoners. And he needs to know that we are here being repressed simply for exercising our right to express ourselves and manifest in a non-violent way."

== 2021 arrest ==
In July 2021, following the Cuban protests, Saylí Navarro, a Ladies in White member and daughter of dissident Félix Navarro Rodríguez and Ladies in White founding member Sonia Álvarez Campillo, was arrested alongside her father. The following year, she was sentenced to eight years in prison.

== See also ==
- Censorship in Cuba
- Cuban dissident movement
- Human rights in Cuba
- Mothers Against Repression
- Mothers of Khavaran
- Mothers of the Plaza de Mayo
- Mourning Mothers
- Saturday Mothers
- Tiananmen Mothers
