= Cuban protests =

Cuban protests may refer to:

- Negro Rebellion, 1912
- Cuban Revolution, 1953–1959
- Maleconazo, in 1994
- Black Spring (Cuba), in 2003
- 2020 Cuban protests
- 2021 Cuban protests
- March 2024 Cuban protests
- 2024–2026 Cuban protests

== See also ==
- Cuban Revolution (disambiguation)
