= Carolina Barrero =

Cuban art historian

- Born: 1986 (age 39–40); Havana, Cuba
- Education: University of Havana (Bachelor's degree in Art History); Complutense University of Madrid (Master's degree in cultural institutions)
- Occupations: Art historian, writer, human rights activist
- Organization(s): 27N movement, Ciudadanía y Libertad

Carolina Barrero is a Cuban art historian, writer, and human rights activist. She is noted for her having taken part in the 2021 protests that challenged Cuba's totalitarian regime as a member of the 27N movement of artists and intellectuals.

== Biography ==
Born in 1986, Barrero was raised in Havana by her grandparents, where she recalled “being surrounded by books and stories of the Cuban War of Independence, ancient philosophy, and literature”. After graduating from college, one of her first creative endeavors was a project called Showroom, a space for young artists to present their work and promote dialogue surrounding the art. Barrero has written extensively on the power of symbolism in art and the impact of art and history on epistemology.

On 27 January 2021, at the Ministry of Culture, Barrero took part in a protest with other artists to protest against increasing state violence and reprisals against dissents. Barrero led a reading of the poem "Dos Patrias" by Jose Marti as Cuban security forces violently broke up the demonstration, with several being detained. Over the next several months, there were reprisals against the protestors, and Barrero was jailed several times. She experienced routine harassment until ultimately Cuban state security told her to leave Cuba or it would begin targeting her family. Barrero fled to Spain, where she continues her activism to support a free Cuba.
