= Eliécer Ávila =

Cuban computer scientist (born 1985)

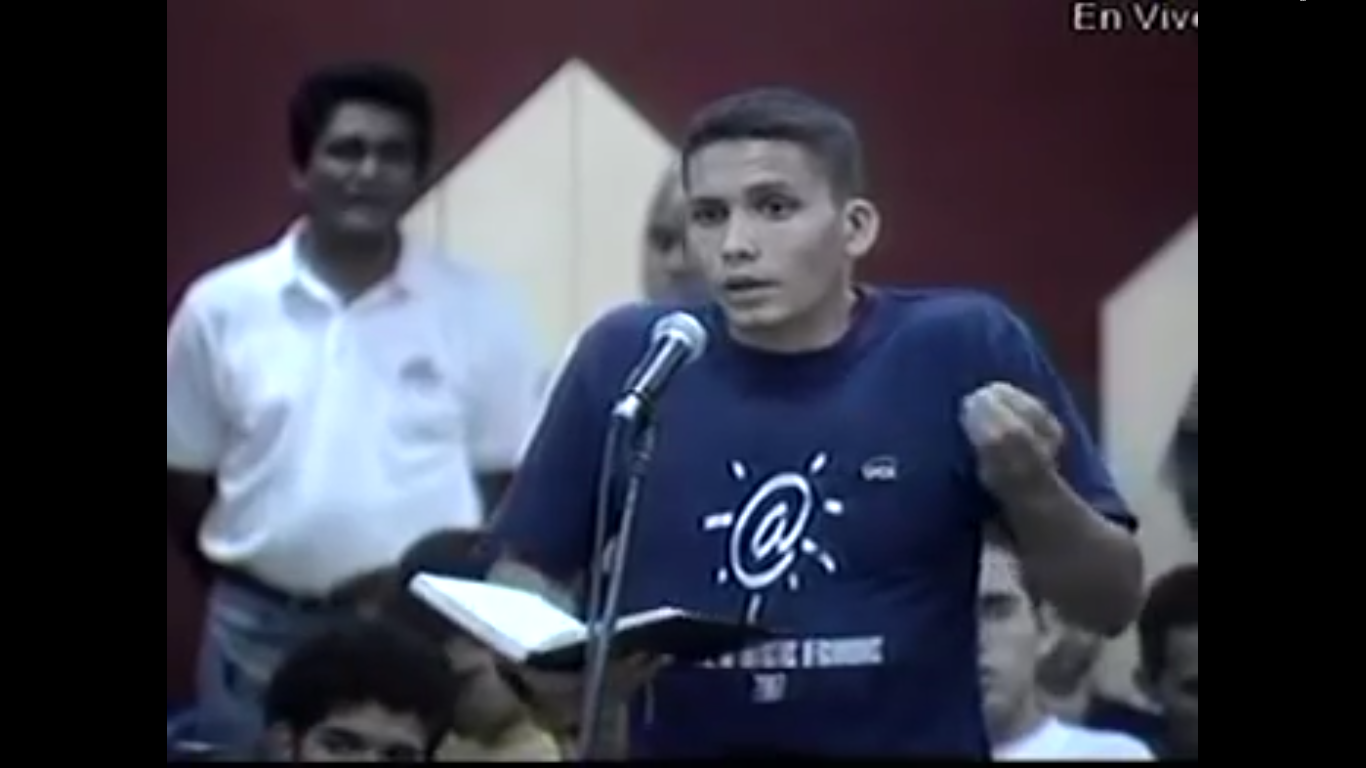
- Born: 1985 (age 40–41); Puerto Padre, Las Tunas, Cuba
- Title: Computer scientist, dissident

Eliécer Ávila Cicilia (born in 1985 in Puerto Padre, Las Tunas, Cuba) is a Cuban computer scientist and dissident. Founder and former president of the Cuban political party Somos Más. Known in Cuba for leading an incident in 2008 while he was a student at the University of Information Science (UCI), in which he asked a series of questions (according to Eliécer, “of great concern for young Cubans") to the then president of the National Assembly of Popular Power, Ricardo Alarcón de Quesada.

== UCI (Universidad de Ciencias Informáticas, “University of Informatic Sciences”) Incident ==
=== Students' Q&A session with Ricardo Alarcón de Quesada ===
Eliécer Ávila was widely known in Cuba as a result of his intervention on January 28, 2008, at the University of Information Science of Cuba (UCI), where the then president of the National Assembly of the Popular Power of Cuba, Ricardo Alarcón de Quesada, had given a round of questions and answers after a talk with computer science students. Eliécer took his turn after another student, Alejandro Rafael Hernández Real, of whose intervention the final fragment was also included in a video that was spread clandestinely within Cuba.

Eliécer asked four questions during his speech, delving into their economic and political implications, such as the quality of public transport, misinformation in the population, the rule of law of the Cuban people and the lack of Internet connectivity. The answers given by Alarcón were widely criticized by the Cuban population, both inside and outside Cuba, once the video was broadcast. It was said that Alarcón did not respond to any of the questions that were put to him, and rather addressed at length problems that existed in the period prior to 1959. Especially criticized was Alarcón's justification for regulating the departure of Cubans abroad: “If the 6 billion people in the world were allowed to travel, they would create a tremendous entanglement in the airs."

Video recordings of Eliécer's questions and Alarcón's respective answers were copied and widely disseminated hand-by-hand among the Cuban population through USB flash drives. The video also received a great deal of international attention, especially from the Cuban exile community. Several Cuban-in-exile opinion outlets have speculated that Ricardo Alarcón's political replacement in 2013 and his subsequent low profile were caused by his responses at this particular conference.

=== Declarations on Cuban state-run mass media ===
After the video had a great impact both inside and outside of Cuba, an unusual political debate arose among the Cuban population and rumors began to emerge regarding his personal situation and an alleged imprisonment and punishment for political reasons. In response to these rumors, on February 11, 2008, the state news agency Cubadebate conducted an interview with five young people who had participated in the conference with Alarcón, including Eliécer. The students interviewed denied having suffered negative repercussions from the Cuban authorities, and classified the speculation in this regard as “criminal manipulation” and “media warfare.” Eliécer said he regretted that his image was the object of distortions and, like his other colleagues, clarified that his objective in asking those questions was not to question the legitimacy of the Cuban government:

In the first place [I would like] to explain that the fact that some students have exposed some issues, some controversies [...] is to better build socialism, and not to destroy it. And for the things that have to be fixed, that have to be changed, that have to be reviewed; we will do it within Revolution.

The following day, the National Newscast of the Cuban Television also broadcast a news clip that included a brief interview with Eliécer Ávila and Alejandro Rafael Hernández, where both once again denied any negative repercussions after the incident. The video recording from the Q&A session between the students and Ricardo Alarcón was never broadcast on Cuban television.

== Dissidence and political activism ==
=== Interview with Estado de SATS ===
Eliecer Ávila made a public appearance again in 2011, 4 years after the UCI incident, in an interview with Antonio Rodiles, coordinator of the independent art and news platform Estado de SATS. During the two-hours-long interview, Eliécer commented to Rodiles that he felt “scammed by the Cuban government.” Eliécer said that the attitude of the Cuban government towards him changed radically after the interview with Cubadebate in 2008. He accused the Cuban government of having sent him to work in precarious conditions at a Youth Computer Club without Internet access in his hometown municipality, Puerto Padre, and having been denied a permanent stay in Havana in retaliation for his questioning of state policies and the Minister of Culture Ricardo Alarcón de Quesada. Eliécer also said that when he was about to graduate he was sanctioned by the university for accepted to participate in an interview with an “independent journalist” (i.e., not affiliated with the Cuban state media) after the video with his questions to Alarcón became popular; although he ultimately managed to get a computer science degree.

Eliécer also said to his interviewer that, after graduating, he reflected deeply on the political situation in Cuba, which he argued was something he wasn't able to do while studying due to “lack of time and information.” He criticized and accused the Communist Party of Cuba of monopolizing power, persecuting other political currents and not allowing the free discussion of ideas. He held him responsible for the poor prospects for the youth and the country's lack of prosperity, and described the Cuban electoral system as “a laughing matter” due to its vertical structure and lack of institutional transparency.
