= Camila Acosta =

Cuban journalist

- Born: 1993 (age 32–33)
- Education: University of Havana
- Occupation: Journalist
- Employer: ABC
- Partner: Ángel Satiesteban

Camila Acosta (1993) is a Cuban journalist that works as a correspondent for the Spanish newspaper ABC in her home country corresponsal. Acosta has been detained several times by Cuban authorities due to her work, openly critic to the Castrista system.

== Career and detentions ==
Camila studied at the Communications Faculty of the University of Havana between 2011 and 2016. She began her professional career working for the official Cuban press and began her social service practices on the Canal Habana television, but soon she switched to independent journalism in media outlets such as Cubanet.

During her career, Acosta has been detained several times in her home country. She has been evicted almost a dozen times by landlords who were threatened with expropriating their properties if they refused to evict her.

Since February 2021 she has collaborated with the Spanish newspaper ABC as a correspondent in Havana, where she has reported on very multiple topics, including the Congress of the Communist Party of Cuba, COVID-19 health crisis, and the bilateral relations between Cuba and the European Union.

One of the last of her detentions took place on 12 July 2021, after informing about the protests that took place that weekend. Prior to her arrest, her digital networks had been blocked and she had not been able to report the latest events.

Her partner is the Cuban writer Ángel Satiesteban.
