= Luis Manuel Otero Alcántara =

Cuban performance artist and dissident (born 1987)

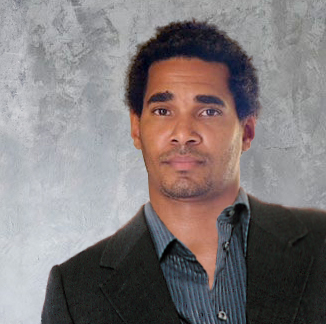
- Born: December 2, 1987 (age 38); Havana, Cuba
- Occupations: performance artist; activist
- Movement: San Isidro Movement

Luis Manuel Otero Alcántara (born December 2, 1987) is a Cuban performance artist and dissident, known for his public performances that openly criticize the Cuban government and its policies, being a leader of San Isidro Movement. A self-taught artist, Alcántara lives in the El Cerro neighborhood of Havana. Since 2018 Alcántara has been arrested dozens of times for his performances in violation of Decree 349, a Cuban law requiring artists to obtain advance permission for public and private exhibitions and performances.

== Protests and arrests ==
In 2017, Otero Alcántara was arrested for "being in illicit possession of construction materials" in relation to his work as a cofounder of the #00 bienal de la Habana, an alternative event to the official Havana Biennial.

In April 2019, Otero Alcántara was arrested by the Cuban police during his participation in a satellite event of the Havana Biennial. On August 10, he was arrested in Havana during part of his performance Drapeau. In the work, he wore a Cuban flag draped over his shoulders, in defiance of a 2019 law dictating how the flag could be used. Also in april, Otero Alcántara organized a performance titled Se USA in Havana, in which participants competed in a 66-metre race carrying the United States flag. The work paid tribute to dissident Daniel Llorente, who had run through Havana's Plaza de la Revolución carrying the American flag during the May Day parade in 2017. Otero Alcántara was arrested by Cuban police while organizing the performance in the San Isidro neighborhood.

On March 1, 2020, Otero Alcántara was arrested in Havana on the charges of defiling patriotic symbols and property damage. At the time of the arrest, was on the way to join a protest at the Cuban Institute of Radio and Television against the censorship of a two men kissing on television. In November 2020, Otero Alcántara took part in a hunger strike as part of the San Isidro Movement. He and other protesters were twice detained by police during the protest. On December 3, he was released from prison, but arrested again the same day when he joined another protest. He was released to house arrest the same day. In April 2021, he initiated another hunger strike, gaining widespread attention and global media coverage.

In May 2021, State security agents dressed as civilians broke into Otero Alcántara's house and forcibly detained him and the poet Afrika Reina. To justify their assault, agents outside the house yelled, "¡Qué viva la revolución! (May the revolution live!) ¡Qué viva Fidel! (Long live Fidel)" The agents also confiscated some of Otero Alcántara's most recent artwork. Later that month, in solidarity with Otero Alcántara, a group of activist Cuban artists working under the name 27N asked the director of the Museum of Fine Arts in Havana to remove their works from public exhibition. On May 21, 2021, Amnesty International named Otero Alcantara a prisoner of conscience. A few days later a group of prominent international cultural figures, including Junot Díaz, Edwidge Danticat, Julie Mehretu, John Akomfrah, and Carrie Mae Weems, issued a public letter to the Cuban president requesting Alcántara's release.

On May 31, 2021, the San Isidro Movement confirmed that Otero Alcántara had been released from custody, after being detained in a hospital for over four weeks. On July 11, 2021, he was arrested by Cuban authorities on his way to join a march calling for freedom. Since then, he has been under custody. On May 30 and 31st of 2022, a closed trial was held in the District Court of Marianao in Havana. Although the international press requested access to the trial, the Cuban Government did not reply to requests. At that time, he was facing up to 7 years in prison. In June of 2022, Otero Alcántara was sentenced to 5 years of incarceration to be served at a Maximum Security Prison in Guanajay, located in the province of Artemisa, Cuba. As of November 2024, he continues to serve his sentence.

Otero Alcántara was scheduled to be released on 9 July 2026, but was instead transferred to an undisclosed location, reportedly to await admission to the United States under the Significant Public Benefit Parole programme. Later that month, he was released and flown to the United States.

On 30 October 2026, to mark International Day of Political Prisoners, Alcántara conducted two performances at the Lincoln Memorial in Washington, D.C., in which he called for the release of Cuban political prisoners Lizandra Góngora and Maykel Osorbo.

== Political views ==
Otero Alcantara has described himself as a humanist, refusing to identify to identify as left wing or right wing. Following his release from prison and arrival to the United States, Otero Alcántara expressed gratitude for the Trump administration and called for increased pressure on the Cuban government. H stated “Cubans on the island, when they saw Donald Trump impose a sanction or something, were grateful.” When asked about a military intervention to Cuba, he described himself as a pacifist but added that “I would support any action, whatever it might be, that could save Cuba” although from “from a pacifist framework”. In october 2026, he participated in an event organized by The United States Mission to the United States, alongside José Daniel Ferrer to prevent the resolution pushed by the Cuban Government to the UN in order to end the embargo.

== Reception of his work ==
Upon arrival to Miami Otero Alcantara unveiled 4000 paintings he claimed to draw during his five-year imprisonment. His former curator and manager Claudia Genlui praised the testimonial weight of the work at El Estornudo. The presentation also prompted debate about the aesthetic merits of the paintings. Historian Jorge Luis León in Periodico Cubano critized the technical execution of the drawings, questioning his rendering of perspectives, proportions and an excessive reliance on the grotesque. Critic Lorenzo Vega-Montoto acknowledged the negative reaction in social media, but argued that they were overlooking Otero Alcántara’s background as a performance artist. At Havana Times, Fabiana del Valle argued that “a work of art must have a voice of its own, that it must stand on its own without needing someone to explain it.” while also pointing artistic limitations on the paintings. The Cuban Arts Observer stated that the visibility of Otero Alcantara’s art was inseparably linked to his growing status as a political dissident. The authorship of some of the works was also challenged by artist Danilo Maldonado.

== Representations in other media ==
Luis Manuel Otero Alcántara has been featured in the documentaries Cuba y la Noche (2026), Estamos conectados (2026), and SOS Cuba (2026). Former President George W. Bush drew a portrait of him for his book The Call for Freedom.

== Awards and recognition ==
In September 2021, Time named Otero Alcántara as one of the 100 most influential people in the world on their annual Time 100 list.

In 2022, Otero Alcántara was one of six recipients of the 2022 Claus Impact Award for his performances that addresses the critical conditions that Cuban citizens are facing. The six other recipients include Ailton Krenak, Alain Gomis, Hassan Darsi, María Medrano, and May al-Ibrashy.
