= San Isidro Movement =

Cuban political dissident group

San Isidro Movement Movimiento San Isidro
- Leader: Luis Manuel Otero Alcántara
- Founded: September 2018; 7 years ago
- Ideology: Anti-communism; Pro-democracy; Cuban nationalism Nonviolence; Anti-statism; Libertarianism

Website
- movimientosanisidro.com

The San Isidro Movement (Spanish: Movimiento San Isidro, abbreviated MSI) is a group of Cuban artists, journalists and academics formed in 2018 to protest against the government's increased censorship of artistic expression in Cuba. The group's members have staged protests, performances and interventions that have resulted in arrests and retaliatory actions by the Cuban government.

== Members ==
Notable members of MSI include rapper Denis Solís and performance artist Luis Manuel Otero Alcántara.

== History ==
The group formed in September 2018 as a reaction to Decree 349, a Cuban law that sought to require that artistic activity had to be authorized in advance by the Cuban culture ministry. The group took its name from the San Isidro area of Havana, where it was formed. Since its founding in 2018, the San Isidro Movement has held a variety of protests including those by performative artist Otero Alcántara who performed a striptease to draw attention to the lack of privacy when accessing the internet, created the Museum of Dissidence in Cuba, as well as a protest to criticize the removal of a bust of communist martyr Julio Antonio Mella to make room for a luxury hotel.

The musician and member of the MSI, Maykel Castillo, has started hunger strikes on several occasions in protest, which have also included periods of dry strike (without drinking water). Other public figures in the arts and culture who oppose Castroism have joined the hunger strike, including journalist Carlos Manuel Álvarez, along with artist and political activist Luis Manuel Otero Alcántara.

In August 2019, the group called for Cubans to post pictures of themselves wearing a Cuban flag on their shoulders, and to post them with the hashtag "#LaBanderaEsDeTodos". This was in response to the arrest of Luis Manuel Otero Alcántara, an MSI founding member, for making a similar performance.

In November 2020, rapper Denis Solis live-streamed his arrest by police, while also claiming that Donald Trump was his president. He was sentenced to eight months imprisonment charged for insulting police. On November 28 access to social networks throughout the island was interrupted for several moments without explanation by the telecommunications company Etecsa. The San Isidro Movement protested Solís' arrest by locking themselves inside a house in San Isidro and starting a hunger strike. After ten days of protest, Cuban police forcibly entered the house, detained and then released the protesters. The police stated that the raid was carried out for reasons related to COVID-19. A protest outside the Cuban Culture Ministry in Havana the next day attracted hundreds, including Tania Bruguera, Jorge Perugorría, Miguel Coyula and Fernando Pérez, and culminated in a meeting between the deputy culture minister, Fernando Rojas, with members of the group, in order to reach agreements and dialogues regarding freedom of expression and other issues related to democracy and human rights in the island. Rojas promised improved freedom for artists; these promises were later criticized by Cuban leader Miguel Díaz-Canel.

In 2020 the rap song Patria y Vida (English: Fatherland and Life) by Descemer Bueno, Gente De Zona, Maykel Osorbo, El Funky and Yotuel included lyrics that paid tribute to the San Isidro Movement. The video of the song, often distributed by flash drive in Cuba, includes appearances by members of MSI.

In April 2021, residents of Havana's San Isidro neighborhood prevented the arrest of rapper Maykel Osorbo amid anti-government slogans and chanting the song Patria y Vida, in whose video Osorbo himself participates.

== Reactions ==
The Inter-American Court of Human Rights (IACHR) rejected the raid on the movement's headquarters, describing the procedure and the subsequent arrests as "arbitrary". It also urged the Cuban State to comply with its commitments and obligations in relation to the granting of essential guarantees, the fulfillment of human rights and due process in judicial matters.

Belgian socialist MP Marie Arena, the chair of the European Parliament's Subcommittee on Human Rights has voiced support for the group, as did US Secretary of State Mike Pompeo, who tweeted that the United States "urged the Cuban regime to cease harassment of San Isidro Movement protesters and to release musician Denis Solís, who was unjustly sentenced to eight months in prison. Freedom of expression is a human right. The United States stands with Cuba's people." In February, 2021, United States Senators Bob Menendez, Marco Rubio, Dick Durbin and Ben Cardin introduced a bipartisan resolution recognizing the San Isidro Movement to the US Senate.

The same month, the Inter-American Commission on Human Rights granted "precautionary measures of protection" for 20 members of the San Isidro Movement, calling them "Human rights defenders ... in a serious and urgent situation of risk of irreparable harm to their rights in Cuba".

On Twitter, Cuba's president and Communist Party first secretary Miguel Díaz-Canel called MSI an "imperial show to destroy our identity and subjugate us again". Cuban state media has described the San Isidro movement as "US mercenaries".

Jump Cut published an essay by independent filmmaker Miguel Coyula which analyzes the hunger strike started by Luis Manuel Otero Alcántara

== See also ==
- 2021 Cuban protests
