= Dina Stars =

Cuban YouTuber and activist

- Occupation: YouTuber

YouTube information
- Channel: DinaStars
- Subscribers: 93.4 thousand
- Last updated: December 2023

Dina Stars is a Cuban YouTuber. By June 2021 she had over 30 thousand subscriptions in YouTube and over 50 thousand followers in Instagram.

In 2021 Dina denounced that she had been subject to threats, blackmail and cyber-harassment that resulted in the loss of her job in two different companies, regretting that there were not laws in Cuba that protected her. In June 2021, Stars publicly criticized the prohibition of Miguel Díaz-Canel's administration of the deposit of dollars in banks in the country.

During the 2021 Cuban protests, in a live interview with the Spanish television program Todo es mentira, Dina was detained by Cuban security officers. She was accused of "promoting protests" in Cuba; she was released the following day.
