= Lizandra Góngora =

Cuban human rights activist

- Citizenship: Cuba
- Known for: Participation in the 2021 Cuban protests
- Criminal charges: sabotage, robbery with force, and public disorder
- Criminal penalty: 14 years' imprisonment
- Criminal status: Detained
- Spouse: Ángel Delgado Almira
- Children: 5

Lizandra Góngora Espinosa is a Cuban human rights activist. After participating in the 2021 Cuban protests, she was arrested and sentenced to 14 years in prison, the longest sentence given to a woman as a result of the protests.

== Biography ==
=== 2021 Cuban protests ===
Góngora is married to Ángel Delgado Almira, with whom she has five children. The family live in Güira de Melena, a municipality in Artemisa Province.

In July 2021, a series of protests broke out across Cuba against the Cuban government and the Communist Party of Cuba, triggered by a shortage of food and medicine in the country; the protests also were seen as a response to the authoritarian regime in the country and the government's curtailing of civil liberties, in addition to its failure to fulfil promised reforms of Cuba's economy and political system. Góngora was arrested after taking part in a protest outside of an MLC store in Güira de Melena, where protesters had demanded that donated food be made available.

At Góngora's trial, prosecutors alleged that she had led the protests and the storming of the MLC shop; Góngora claimed that she had joined the gathering and had subsequently fled after being injured in the leg during a clash between protesters and the authorities. Góngora was found guilty of "sabotage, robbery with force, and public disorder", and was sentenced to 14 years in prison; this marked the longest sentence given to a female protester as a result of the crackdown on the July 2021 protests.

=== Imprisonment ===
In September 2022, Góngora and fellow prisoners María Cristina Garrido and Ángela Garrido started a hunger strike in prison, demanding their freedom and their right to not wear prison uniforms. As a result of the strike, Góngora was subsequently hospitalised and required medical treatment. In February 2023, Góngora's husband Delgado reported that Cuban authorities had threatened to "revoke" his custody of his children and imprison him if he continued to speak out about Góngora's detention.

In March 2023, Góngora was among 11 political prisoners who signed an open letter calling on Miguel Díaz-Canel, the First Secretary of the Communist Party of Cuba and the President of Cuba, to release political prisoners from Cuban prisons. The letter, which the women signed with their blood, cited comments made by Pope Francis's emissary, Beniamino Stella, who stated that the Pope "very much [hoped] that there [would] be a positive response" from Cuban authorities concerning the freedom from detention of political prisoners. The following month, Góngora was temporarily relocated to Los Colonos prison on the Isla de la Juventud for three months, which was seen as an attempt to isolate her from her family following the publication of the open letter.

In May 2023, the Cuban Resistance Assembly announced an initiative wherein 137 women with "public impact" in Latin America would be paired to 137 female political prisoners in Cuba as symbolic godmothers. Góngora was paired with Martha Evelyn Batres, the head of the Women's Network, a Salvadoran women's group, who said she "championed [Góngora's] fight for fredom".

Góngora was transferred to Los Colonos for a second time in April 2026, a considerable distance from her family in Güira de Melena. The Cuban Institute for Freedom of Expression and the Press reported that prison authorities had threatened that Góngora could be transferred to prisons further afield in Pinar del Río or Guantánamo if she continued to publicly request to be brought closer to Güira de Melena.

In April 2026, the Cuban non-governmental organisation Cubalex reported that Góngora had been denied treatment for sickle cell anaemia and a uterine fibroid while in prison. That month, she took part in a second hunger and thirst strike in response to a lack of medical care, poor conditions, including being harassed and assaulted, and prolonged isolation from her family since being in prison; as well as in response to Miguel Díaz-Canel's public denial of the existence of political prisoners in Cuba, which her husband added was to "demand respect" for her status as a political prisoner. After her strike, she was transferred to an isolation cell.

Góngora remains in prison as of July 2026.

== Response ==
Cubalex called on the Cuban government to allow Góngora to have access to medical treatment and regular contact with her family, describing her transfer to Los Colonos as being in contravention of the Nelson Mandela rules and the Bangkok rules that establish that prisoners, particularly women with children, should be detained close to their families. The Chargé d'affaires of the Embassy of the United States in Cuba, Mike Hammer, said in a telephone call with Góngora's husband Delgado said that the United States and the administration of Donald Trump were "concerned" about the situation of Góngora and other political prisoners in Cuba, and that they would continue to "insist" she be released.

In May 2025, Góngora was awarded the Graciela Fernández Meijide Award for the Defence of Human Rights from the Centre for the Opening and Development of Latin America, alongside fellow Cuban activist Alexander Fábregas. Also awarded were Nicaraguan activist Nancy Elizabeth Rodríguez and Venezuelan journalist Carlos Julio Rojas.

On 30 October 2026, to mark International Day of Political Prisoners, Cuban artist and activist Luis Manuel Otero Alcántara conducted two performances at the Lincoln Memorial in Washington, D.C., in which he called for the release of Góngora, as well as Maykel Osorbo.
