= 2020 Cuban protests =

The 2020 Cuban protests were a series of peaceful demonstrations nationwide in Cuba between 29 June 2020, and 2 December 2020, as a result of the death of Hansel Hernández, which took place on 24 June 2020, in the La Lima district, Guanabacoa, Havana, following an altercation with the local police. The reason for the altercation was that Hernández, an Afro-Cuban man, allegedly shoplifted. The latter, faced with the possibility of being arrested, tried to escape. During the 1.2 miles chase, the subject threw stones at the police officers, who opened fire on Hernández, dying of a shot in the back. The government's official version is that it was only one police officer, wounded by stones thrown by the subject, who fired at Hernández. The photo of the body was uploaded to Facebook by a local pedestrian, going viral in a short time. The National Revolutionary Police Force deplored the event but said the subject had a criminal record. The event was interpreted as an act of police brutality and racism by the Afro-Cuban community, for which Hernández was called "the George Floyd of Cuba", leading to demonstrations across the island.

On 29 June 2020, peaceful demonstrations were held throughout the territory, and in addition to demanding justice for Hernández, they also demanded the release of opponents such as Silverio Portal Contreras. The Cuban government accused the opposition of propagating fake news; on the other hand, the government was criticized for the sources used by related media coming from a YouTube channel with accusations of racism, homophobia, and transphobia. On 30 July, members of the Revolutionary Armed Forces of Cuba were transferred to various parts of Havana to control the demonstrations. The Committee to Protect Journalists reported that the state company ETECSA cut off access to internet in Cuba to prevent an increase in demonstrations.

== See also ==
- 2021 Cuban protests
- Black Spring (Cuba)
- Cuban Revolution
- Maleconazo
