= Cuban Revolution (disambiguation) =

The Cuban Revolution normally refers to the 1953–1959 revolution led by Fidel Castro.

Other conflicts known as the Cuban Revolution are:

- Ten Years' War, Cuban independence conflict of 1868–1878
- Little War (Cuba), conflict of 1879–1880
- Cuban War of Independence, conflict with Spain of 1895–1898
- Sergeants' Revolt, 1933 coup led by Fulgencio Batista

== See also ==
- Cuban protests (disambiguation)
