= Assembly of the Cuban Resistance =

Cuban activist group

The Assembly of the Cuban Resistance (Spanish: Asamblea de la Resistencia Cubana, abbreviated ACR) is a coalition of anti-government human rights groups inside and outside Cuba. Their members are signatories of the "Agreement for Democracy in Cuba" drafted in 1998, and "My Signature for my Dignity" in 2020. The ACR considers the Cuban government illegal, and supports free elections and the release of all political prisoners.

The ACR combines street action mobilization with high-level lobbying. It is an influential coalition internationally, among the Cuban diaspora and the island's civil society. It has launched the campaigns "All for a Free Cuba" and "Don't Aid", organized multiple protests inside and outside the island, participated in international forums, and supported the establishment of an international tribunal for the prosecution of crimes against humanity in Cuba.

The Assembly of the Cuban Resistance works closely with and coordinates with Cuban exile communities in diverse cities in the United States and abroad. In the states of New Jersey, Illinois, California, Texas, in Puerto Rico, and in the Dominican Republic.

== History ==
The ACR was founded on 18 March 2009, on the 6th anniversary of the Cuban “Black Spring” to map out a democratic transition in Cuba.

== Activities ==
=== Political influence ===
The ACR meets with political leaders and diplomats, some of the most recent meetings include (1) a roundtable on “Supporting the People of Venezuela” with President Trump on 10 June 2020; (2) a meeting with Chilean Minister of Foreign Affairs Teodoro Ribera Neumann on 6 March 2020; (3) with Taiwanese President Tsai Ing-wen on 11 October 2019; (4) with the Costa Rican Minister of Foreign Affairs Manuel E. Ventura Robles on 22 February 2019; (5) with President Bolsonaro on 20 December 2018; (6) with OAS Secretary General Luis Almagro on 21 September 2018; (7) a Summit of the Union of Latin American Political Parties (Unión de Partidos Latinoamericanos - UPLA) with Chilean President Sebastián Piñera on 7 June 2018; (8) a meeting with Governor of Florida Rick Scott on 18 May 2018; (9) with Peruvian Vice-president Mercedes Rosalba Aráoz Fernandez, (10) Peruvian Minister of Justice and Human Rights Salvador Heresi, (11) the president of the Peruvian Congress, Luis Galarreta, (12) and the U.S. Ambassador to the OAS Carlos Trujillo in April 2018; (13) and Vice-president Mike Pence on 16 June 2017.

In 2018, the ACR's “Don’t Aid” campaign, consisting of public information, advocacy in media, gathering support from local public officials, and protests, aided other public diplomacy efforts aimed at ending cruise tourism to Cuba that directly benefited the Cuban military.

In 2019, the ACR campaigned in support of efforts by members of the U.S. Congress and Administration officials to end the suspension of Title III and IV of the Helms-Burton Act, a law that, for the first time, allowed American citizens to sue companies that benefited from private properties that had been confiscated in Cuba.

On 13 April 2016, the ACR spoke before the Miami Beach Commission to oppose the establishment of a Cuban consulate in the area, which had been proposed by the Mayor of Miami Beach. The city commission voted 4–3 in favor of the Assembly and residents.

=== International ===
On 24 February 2019, the ACR invited Venezuelan and Nicaraguan exiles living in South Florida to the Congress of the Resistance.

The Assembly was one of the organizations invited to the VIII Summit of the Americas on 13 and 14 April 2018 in Lima, Peru.

=== Campaigns ===
Inside Cuba, member organizations created the “Pa la Calle” campaign that promotes protests in the streets to call for democracy and the respect of human rights. The activities include “pots and pans cacerolazo” protests, prayer chains, and protests in the streets in provinces like Villa Clara, Havana, Pinar del Rio, Holguin, Granma, Las Tunas, Cienfuegos, Camaguey, Santiago de Cuba, Matanzas, and Ciego de Avila.

In 2016, the ACR launched the “All for a Free Cuba” campaign, a plan for the "liberation, democratization, and reconstruction" of the island with the participation of Cuban activists and leaders, inside and outside Cuba. On 11 October 2016, over a thousand people gathered at the Miami Airport Hilton hotel to support the campaign.

=== Protests ===
On 30 November 2016, thousands of people participated in a protest organized by Cuban exile groups, including the ACR, after the death of Fidel Castro. It was held at the Bay of Pigs Monument in Miami.

On 26 February 2010, fifteen members of the ACR occupied the Brazilian consulate in Miami for about an hour in order to bring attention to the death of political prisoner Orlando Zapata Tamayo in a Cuban prison as Brazilian President Lula da Silva was visiting the island.

The Assembly has organized several caravans of cars in Miami: For instance, on 29 October 2018, to protest cruise tourism to the island.
