= Maleconazo =

1994 Cuban protest

- Part of the Special Period
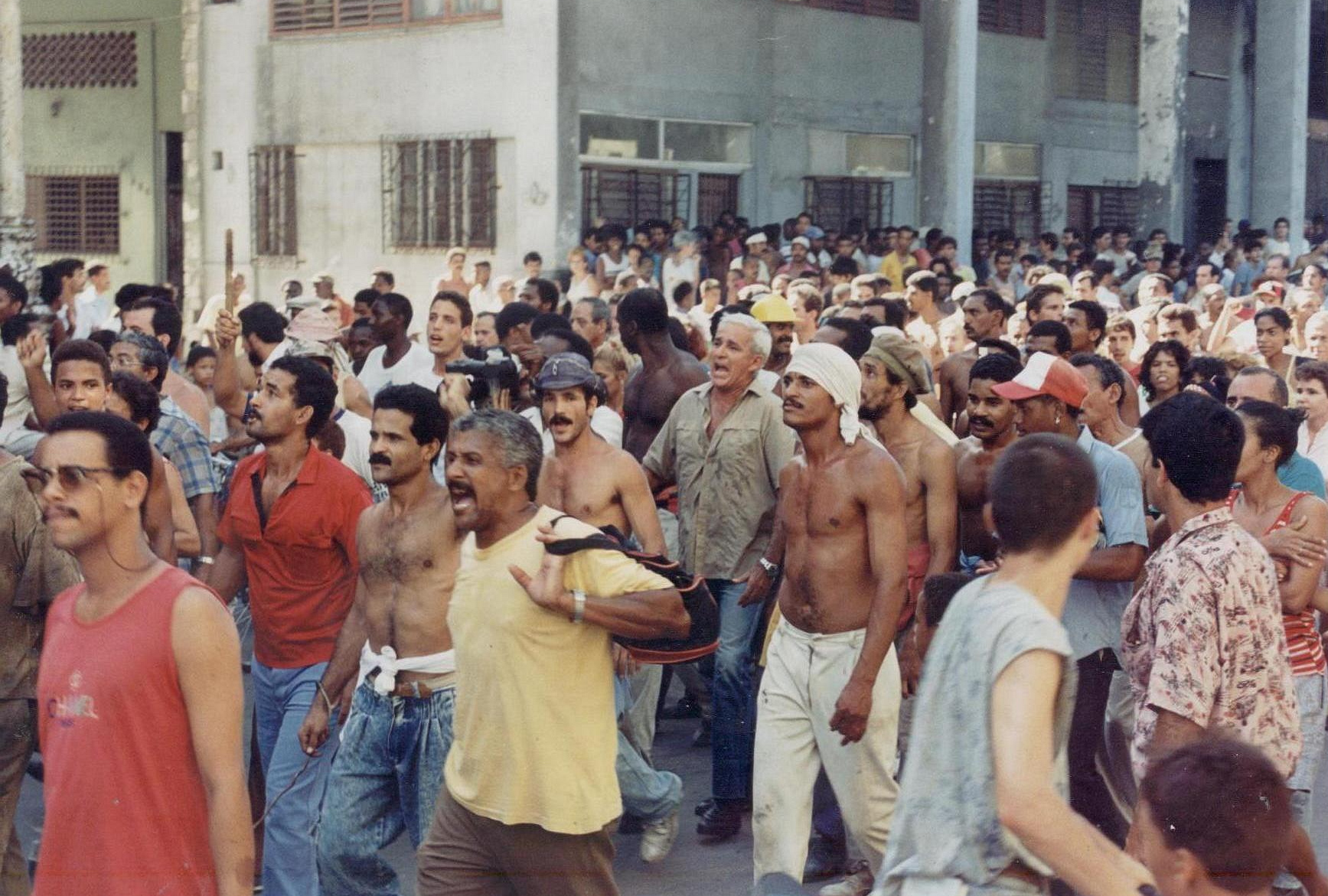
- Protesters in the streets
- Date: 5 August 1994
- Location: Havana, Cuba
- Goals: Resignation of Fidel Castro; Dissolution of the Communist Party of Cuba; Disbanding of Cuban Revolutionary Armed Forces; Democratization of Cuba; General elections; International aid
- Methods: Vandalism; Looting
- Result: Protests suppressed by Cuban government; Continued political repression

Parties
Government of Cuba: Communist Party of Cuba; National Revolutionary Police	Protesters

Lead figures
Fidel Castro; Raúl Castro; Ricardo Alarcon de Quesada	No centralized leadership

The Maleconazo was a protest on 5 August 1994, in which thousands of Cubans took to the streets around the Malecón in Havana to demand freedom and express frustration with the government. Following the collapse of the Soviet Union in the early 1990s, Cuba fell into a crippling economic crisis that had many citizens looking to flee the island. On the day of the protest, the Cuban police blocked people from boarding tugboats leaving Havana, prompting thousands of citizens to storm the streets in the largest anti-government demonstration Cuba had seen since the Cuban Revolution. In the following weeks, President Fidel Castro quelled the frustration by opening the doors of the country and allowing Cubans to leave, which had a significant impact on Cuba's relationship with the United States moving forward.

== Background ==
The Soviet Union was Cuba's primary ally since 1961, providing the island with significant subsidies, military support, and resources. Throughout this time, the Soviet bloc had been Cuba's main trading partner, serving as a safety net that guaranteed economic security and basic needs for citizens. The Soviet Union even sold Cuba oil at discounted prices, and allowed them to re-export whatever they did not use for profit. This alone made up 40% of Cuba's revenue during the 1980s. As a result of all this support, the Cuban economy became dependent on the country's relationship with the Soviet Union.

Therefore, following the collapse of the Soviet Union in 1991, the Cuban economy crumbled. The country rapidly lost around 80% of its trade and its main supplier of food and fuel. Industries that depended on oil imports, such as transportation and agriculture, were paralyzed. On top of all this, the US would soon tighten its trade embargo against Cuba with the Torricelli and Helms-Burton Acts.

Fidel Castro coined this time of crisis as a “Special Period in a Time of Peace”, and the government responded by implementing rationing schedules and adjusting economic policies. Food consumption throughout the city was cut to around one-fifth of its previous level, resulting in a stark decrease in caloric intake among Cuban citizens. The government also limited utility services to a few hours every day. At times, there were widespread blackouts lasting up to twenty hours. In an attempt to revamp the economy, the government increased production of hard currency, rejoined international trade networks, and opened the market to self-employment and small businesses. During these transitions, the country continued to see shortages of food, medicine, transportation, and standard consumer goods. By 1994, there was widespread frustration over the poor standards of living, and many Cubans looked to leave the island.

On 13 July 1994, 70 Cubans hijacked the tugboat 13 de marzo in an attempt to make it to the United States. Shortly after leaving Cuba's coast, the boat sank and government vessels provided very limited assistance, causing 37 passengers to drown. Survivors claimed that the boat was deliberately sunk by the coast guard, however this was strongly denied by the government. Regardless, the event generated widespread distrust in the police and sparked even more escape attempts.

== Protests ==
On 5 August, Cuban authorities discovered an illegal boat passage that many citizens were using to reach the U.S. In response, they formed a blockade around the Malecon, preventing anyone from leaving the island. With nowhere else to go, Cubans soon stormed the streets to protest and express their pent up frustration.

The protests quickly turned to rioting as angry citizens broke windows and looted shops. They chanted "Freedom!" and "Down with the Castros!" It was the largest public defiance of the government and most open criticism of Castro since he came to power.

== Police response ==
The protesters were quickly confronted by armed local police, state security agents, and paramilitaries. Several videos and testimonials show these authorities shooting at and beating the protesters for their counterrevolutionary actions. In certain locations, military trucks with special troops arrived to patrol the streets. The chaos began to die down in the afternoon when Fidel Castro arrived to speak to the Cuban people. By this time, there had been around 370 recorded arrests and 30 injuries, 11 of which were police officers.

== Aftermath ==
The protests dispersed in the afternoon when Fidel Castro arrived on the scene to address the Cuban people. He blamed Cuba's recent struggles on the United States, referencing the trade embargo and attempts to “provoke” disorder and illegal immigration attempts. A week later, Castro provided further relief by ordering the coast guard to once again allow citizens to depart the island.

In the months following, over 30,000 Cuban refugees fled on rafts and tugboats in an event known as the 1994 Cuban rafter crisis. These refugees were initially welcomed into the United States due to the Cuban Adjustment Act, which gave them a pathway to legal residency. However, the volume of immigrants was unmanageable in South Florida, forcing U.S. president Bill Clinton to enact the wet foot dry foot policy. This allowed the U.S. to turn away Cuban immigrants that were stopped at sea (wet foot), while still accepting those who made it to shore (dry feet). Castro came to support the exodus, viewing those who left as counterrevolutionaries. Such support generated rumors that Cuba was sending off "undesirables", fueling anti-immigrant sentiments in the U.S.

== See also ==
- Black Spring (Cuba)
- 2020 Cuban protests
- 2021 Cuban protests
