= Racism in Cuba =

Race conceptions in Cuba are unique because of its long history of racial mixing and appeals to a "raceless" society. The Cuban census reports that 65% of the population is white, while foreign figures report an estimate of the number of whites at anywhere from 40 to 45 percent. This is likely due to the self-identifying mulattos who are sometimes designated officially as white.

Dark-skinned Afro-Cubans are the only group in Cuba referred to as black, while lighter-skinned, mixed-race Afro-Cuban mulattos are often not characterized as fully black or fully white. A common myth in Cuba is that every Cuban has at least some African ancestry, influenced by historical mestizaje nationalism; however, given the high number of immigrants from Europe in the 20th century, this is far from true. Several pivotal events have impacted race relations on the island. Using the historic race-blind nationalism first established around the time of independence, Cuba has navigated the abolition of slavery, the suppression of black clubs and political parties, the revolution and its aftermath, and the Special Period.

== History ==
=== Slavery and Independence ===
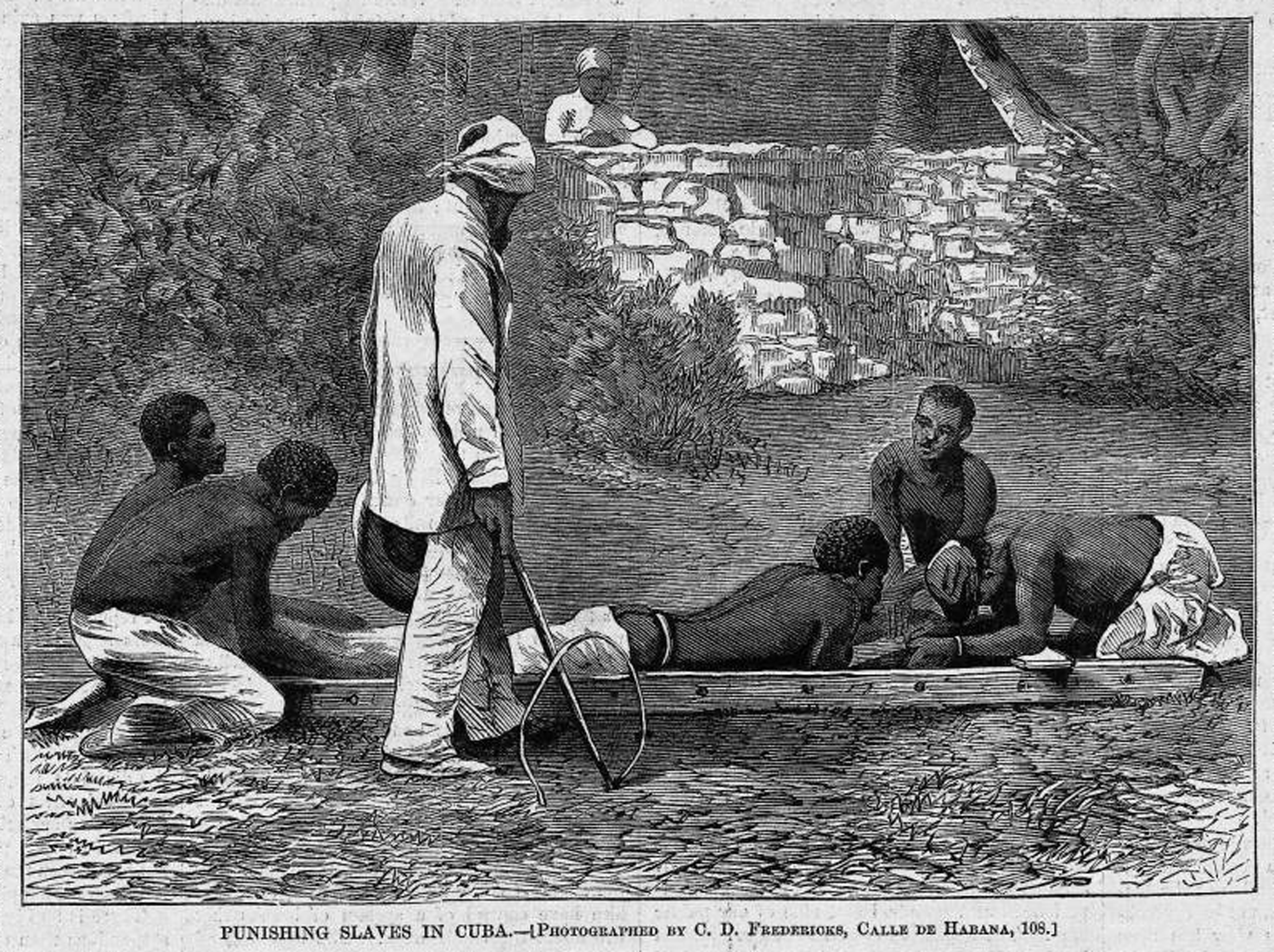
American illustration showing a black slave driver whipping a black slave in Cuba.

According to Voyages – The Transatlantic Slave Trade Database, about 900,000 Africans were brought to Cuba as slaves. To compare, some 470,000 Africans were brought to what is now the United States, and 5,500,000 to the much vaster region of what is now Brazil.

As slavery was abolished or restricted in other areas of the Americas during the 19th century, the Cuban slave trade grew dramatically. Just between 1790 and 1820, 325,000 Africans were brought to Cuba, quadruple the number from the people brought in the last 30 years. The abolition of slavery was a gradual process that began during the first war for independence. On October 10, 1868, Carlos Manuel de Céspedes, a plantation owner, freed all of his slaves and asked them to join him in liberating Cuba from Spanish occupation. There were a number of small rebellions in the next several decades which led Spain to counteract. Spanish propaganda convinced white Cubans that independence would only pave the way for a race war; That Afro-Cubans would take their revenge and conquer the island. At this time, white colonists were terrified that the Haitian Revolution would occur elsewhere, like in Cuba. This fear of a black revolt painted perceptions about racial justice and stalled progress in race relations for the next several decades, if not still prevalent today.

In order to refute this claim, anti-racism activists and politicians of the time created the image of the loyal black soldier who existed only to serve the independence movement. This conception that painted Cubans of color as obedient, and single-mindedly in favor of independence was the opposite of the savage, sexually aggressive stereotype of Spanish propaganda. After this, whites were persuaded to think that because the independence movements helped to end slavery, that there was no reason for a black revolt; black people ought to be thankful for their freedom. And further, race was an invented obstacle according to the influential thinkers of the day. It was in these years that the ideas of José Martí or the words of General Antonio Maceo, “no whites nor blacks, but only Cubans” took hold on the island. These two iconic figures represented black and white cooperation, and raceless Cuban patriotism. To this day, some Cubans argue that race as a concept only exists to divide; it isn't real. Following the abolition of slavery, Afro-Cubans joined the armed forces in droves to fight against the colonial occupation of Spain. At least half of all soldiers who fought in the wars for independence were Afro-Cuban.

=== Independent Party of Color ===
In 1908, Evaristo Estenoz and Pedro Ivonet, two veterans from the independence wars, created the Partido Independiente de Color (Independent Party of Color, or PIC) as the first political party for non-white Cubans. In the aftermath of the Cuban war of independence, Afro-Cuban men, a number of whom were veterans, expected a distinct shift in racial politics on the island after Spain was no longer in charge. This was due especially to the substantial impact the Afro-Cuban community made to the war effort. In the subsequent decades, Afro-Cubans watched as white citizens and immigrants enjoyed economic stability while the black population grew more dissatisfied. Immigration was restricted to Spanish born persons in an effort to whiten (blanqueamiento) the island. This was a measure heavily supported by the United States who had a vested interest in Cuba's economic well-being.

In response and due to the race blind ideology of racial liberation created by Jose Marti and General Maceo, white Cubans were furious that a political party based on racial identity existed on the island. The PIC was called racist and exclusionary; they accepted white members but only elected black leaders to the party. The party was met with heavy backlash. Some white Cubans claimed that the establishment of a party based on race was itself racist. In 1910, Senator Martín Morúa Delgado, mulatto himself, presented and helped pass a law to ban race-based political parties, effectively outlawing the PIC. The members of the PIC were not happy about this news. In 1912, Afro-Cubans took to the streets in armed protest against this law. Sources vary on the original organizers of the protest that occurred as a result of this ban. In response, President Machado ordered the military to end the rebellion, violently if necessary. Joined by private white militias, the national guard proceeded to kill between 3000 and 7000 Afro-Cubans, some of whom were not involved in the uprising at all. This massacre, often called the Little Race War or War of 1912, cloaked the tone of race conversation for decades to come.

=== Cuban Revolution ===
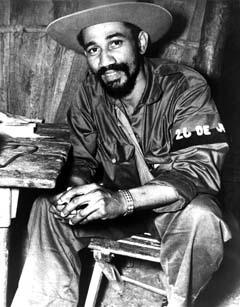
General Juan Almeida Bosque, a prominent Afro-Cuban in the revolutionary army.

Institutionally speaking, Cubans of color benefited disproportionately from the 1959 Cuban Revolutionary reform. After the overthrow of the Batista regime, Fidel Castro established racism as one of the central battles of the revolution. Though Cuba never had formal, state sanctioned segregation, privatization disenfranchised Cubans of color specifically. Previously white only private pools, beaches, and schools were made public, free, and opened up to Cubans of all races and classes. Because much of the Afro-Cuban population on the island was impoverished before the revolution, they benefited widely from the policies for affordable housing, the literacy program, universal free education in general, and healthcare. But above all, Castro insisted that the greatest obstacle for Cubans of color was access to employment. By the mid 1980s, racial inequality on paper was virtually nonexistent. Cubans of color graduated at the same (or higher) rate as white Cubans. The races had an equal life expectancy and were equally represented in the professional arena.

When Fidel Castro seized power of Cuba in 1959, his administration quickly got to work. They passed more than 1500 legislative pieces during the first 30 months. These laws included priorities such as education, poverty, land distribution, and race. However, Castro's approach to race and eliminating racial divides was to make Cuba a raceless nation, rather focusing on people's Cuban identity and eliminating the perception of race all together. It was an anti-discrimination campaign in its purest form, there could be no discrimination of races if there was a raceless country, just Cubans.

The revolutionary regime aligned itself with the race-blind narrative historically embedded in Cuba's race relations. Due to this, Castro refused to enact laws that directly addressed and condemned race-based persecution because he considered them unnecessary or even anti-Cuban. Instead, he believed that fixing economic structures for a better distribution of wealth would end racism. The Cuban Revolution also employed the use of the loyal black soldier of the independence days in order to curb white resistance to the new policies. Scholars argue that raceless rhetoric left Cuba unprepared to address the deep-seated culture of racism on the island. Two years after his 1959 speech at the Havana Labor Rally, Castro declared that the age of racism and discrimination was over. In a speech given at the Confederation of Cuban Workers in observance of May Day, Castro declared that the "just laws of the Revolution ended unemployment, put an end to villages without hospitals and schools, enacted laws which ended discrimination, control by monopolies, humiliation, and the suffering of the people." After this announcement, any attempt by Afro-Cubans to open up discussion on race again was met with great resistance. If the regime claimed that racism was gone, an attempt to reignite the conversation on race was thus counterrevolutionary.

Though Castro's vision for Cuba was to not see color, a concept which some today view as futile, he addressed racial discrimination and inopportunity by converting previously segregated and "white only" spaces to integrated spaces. Black Cubans and mulattos got access to opportunities not possible under Batista. There was education and employment opportunities, even gaining access to recreational facilities and beaches.

Castro's government promised to get rid of racism in three years, despite Cuba's violent history of colonialism. In January 1959, the government's official newspaper, Revolución, the title of this edition was "Not Blacks, but Citizens". Some critique this due to the framing of this campaign and title that in order to be a citizen, Black Cubans could not hold on to their Black identity. In order for them to be integrated into Castro's new society, they were expected to just be Cuban. This is not something that Black Cubans could easily do, as it shaped their lives on the island. Black Cubans still experienced employment discrimination, especially when their economy relied on tourism, and they experienced more challenging conditions when in poverty.

Some statistics show the successes of this approach to anti-racism in Cuba. Some critique the Cuban Revolution for centering the voices of white revolutionaries and not enough Black leaders, even though they acknowledge that they were at the table. Cuba, by 1980, had equal life expectancy rates of Black and White people, a stark contrast from the United States and Brazil which had large inequalities in terms of life expectancies.

=== Special Period ===
With the reintroduction of capitalist practices to the island due to the fall of the Soviet Union and subsequent economic depression in the late 80's and early 90's, Afro-Cubans have found themselves at a disadvantage. Because the majority of those that emigrated from Cuba to the United States were middle class and white, Cubans of color still on the island were far less likely to receive remittances—dollars gifted from relatives in the United States. With a free market came private businesses. The majority of which were from western countries with distinct racial biases of their own. Because of this, less Afro-Cubans were hired to work in the rising tourist sector. Hiring practices favored applicants with buena presencia, or good appearance, that adheres to European standards of beauty and respectability, therefore lighter-skinned or white Cubans were favored by foreign run establishments. Similarly, in housing, despite improvements, racial difference persists due to various causes, such as inequality in house ownership inherited from before the revolution and black people's "lack of resources and connections." The Afro-Cubans interviewed by Sawyer, even when they complained of racism and government policies, expressed their conviction that "things would be worse under the leadership of the Miami exile community or in the United States," and that "[t]he revolution has done so much for us." This "provide[s] Afro-Cubans with a reason to support the current regime."

== The Debate ==
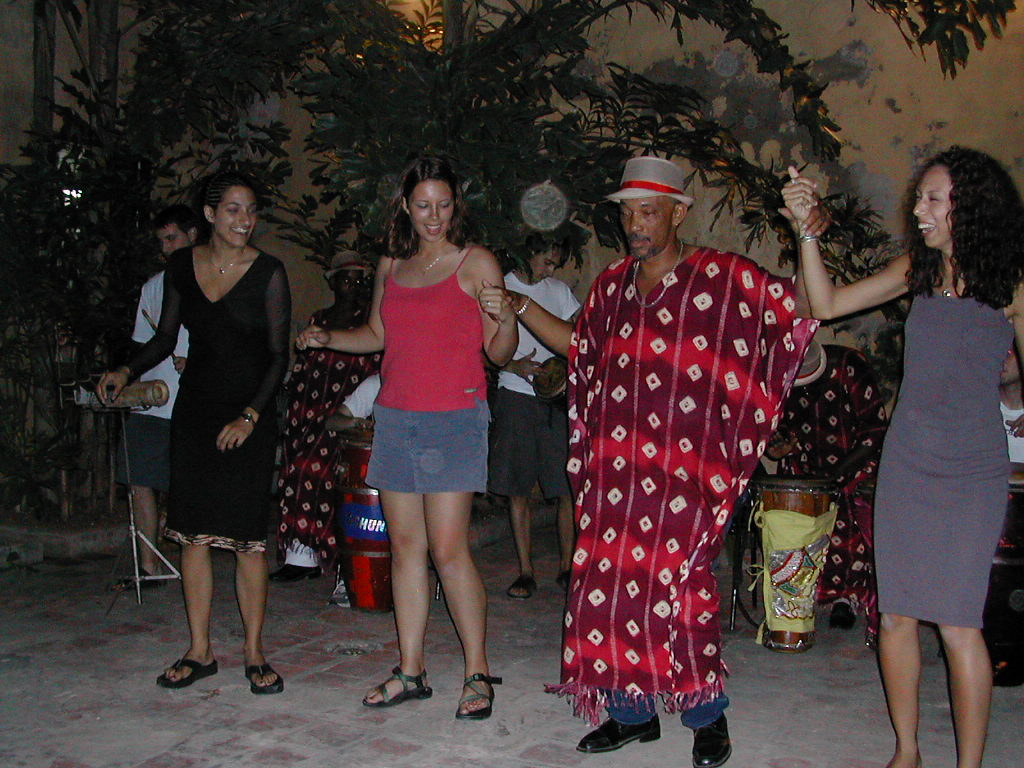
A Cuban man of color teaching an Afro-Cuban dance.

There is heavy debate today on how the 1959 revolution impacted race relations on the island. Overall, the debate of racism in Cuba typically takes one of two extremes. Either the revolution ended racism, or it exacerbated or even created racial tension on the island. A number of scholars of race in Cuba take a far more qualifying position that while the revolution helped Afro-Cubans, it also halted any further racial progress beyond institutionalization.

Proponents of the position that the revolution eliminated racism tend to be more supportive of the revolution and the Cuban government, and may be more likely to have witnessed racial discrimination in pre-revolutionary Cuba. They argue that the dismantling of economic class through socialism destroyed the material perpetuation of racism. In 1966, Castro himself said that, “Discrimination disappeared when class privileges disappeared." Castro also often compared the anti-racism of Cuba to the United States' segregation, and labeled Cuba as a "Afro-Latin" nation when justifying anti-imperial support to liberation fronts in Africa.

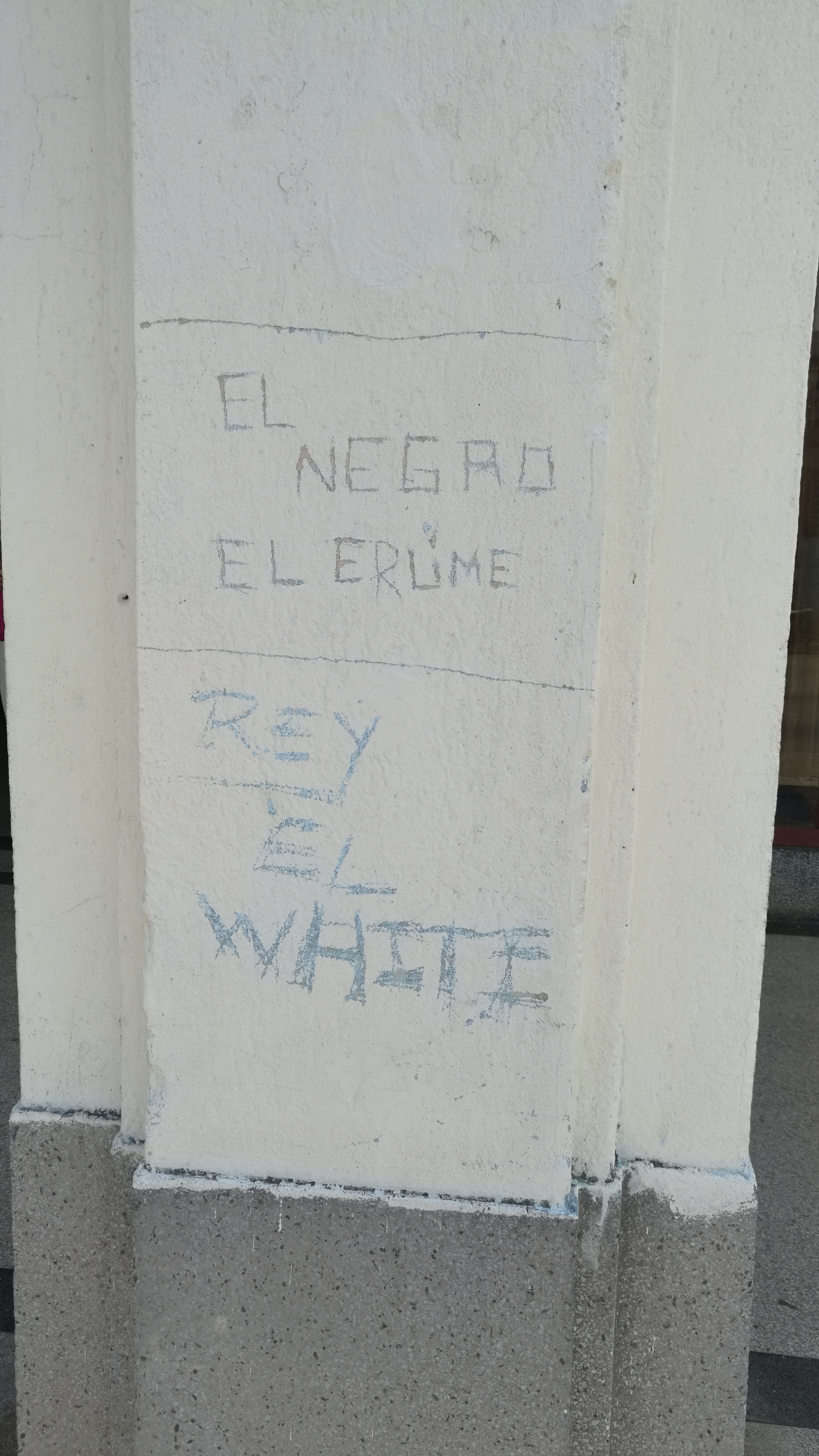
Graffiti in Havana, 2017.

Many who argue that Cuba is not racist base their claims on the idea of Latin American exceptionalism. According to this argument, a social history of intermarriage and mixing of the races is unique to Latin America. The large mestizo populations that result from high levels of interracial union common to the region are often linked to racial democracy. For a number of Cubans this translates into an argument of "racial harmony," often referred to as racial democracy. According to Mark Q. Sawyer, in the case of Cuba, ideas of Latin American Exceptionalism have delayed the progress of true racial harmony.

While some opponents of the Revolution, such as Cuban emigrants, argue that Castro created race problems on the island, the most common claim for the exacerbation of racism is the revolution's inability to accept Afro-Cubans who want to claim a black identity. After 1961, it was simply taboo to talk about race at all. Antiracist Cuban activists who rejected a raceless approach and wanted to show pride in their blackness such as Walterio Carbonell and Juan René Betancourt in the 1960s, were punished with exile or imprisonment.

Esteban Morales Domínguez, a professor in the University of Havana, believes that "the absence of the debate on the racial problem already threatens {...} the revolution's social project." Carlos Moore, who has written extensively on the issue, says that "there is an unstated threat, blacks in Cuba know that whenever you raise race in Cuba, you go to jail. Therefore the struggle in Cuba is different. There cannot be a civil rights movement. You will have instantly 10,000 black people dead." He says that a new generation of black Cubans are looking at politics in another way. Cuban rap groups of today are fighting against this censorship; Hermanos de Causa explains the problem by saying, "Don’t you tell me that there isn’t any [racism], because I have seen it / don’t tell me that it doesn’t exist, because I have lived it."

== See also ==
- Human rights in Cuba
- Politics of Cuba

== Books and papers ==
- "Race and Inequality in Cuba Today" (Raza y desigualdad en la Cuba actual) by Rodrigo Espina and Pablo Rodriguez Ruiz
- "The Challenges of the Racial Problem in Cuba" (Fundación Fernando Ortiz) by Esteban Morales Dominguez
- Sujatha Fernandes, Fear of a Black Nation: Local Rappers, Transnational Crossings, and State Power in Contemporary Cuba, Anthropological Quarterly, Volume 76, Number 4, Fall 2003, pp. 575–608, E-ISSN 1534-1518 Print ISSN 0003-5491
- "Racism in Cuba: news about racism in Cuba in English and Spanish (2006–)"
- Revolution and race: Blacks in contemporary Cuba by Lourdes Casal (1979)
