= Mesa Redonda Internacional =

- Presented by: Randy Alonso Falcón; Arleen Rodríguez Derivet
- Original language: Spanish

Production
- Producers: teleSUR; Cuban Institute of Radio and Television
- Running time: 60 minutes

Original release
- Network: teleSUR
- Release: 2005 – present

Mesa Redonda Internacional (Spanish for International Round Table) is a Latin American communist news analysis talk-show broadcast by teleSUR live from Havana, Cuba, on Thursday nights. The program is, according to the description given of it on the network's website, "a television program for the integration of various forms of (political and social) thought throughout our continent" (Latin America). The program is sometimes hosted by Randy Alonso Falcón or Arleen Rodríguez Derivet, both Cuban journalists and contributors in various media on the Internet, including Cubadebate.

The program is also broadcast in Cuba via public-owned media in a sporadic way.
