= Decree 349 =

Cuban law restricting artistic expression

Decree 349 is a 2018 Cuban law requiring artists to obtain advance permission for public and private exhibitions and performances. The law was first proposed April 20, 2018 by Cuban president Miguel Díaz-Canel, and was published in the Gaceta de Cuba on July 10.

The law gives the government the right to shut down art and book sales, exhibitions, concerts and performances that contain prohibited content. In particular, the law bans art that contains “sexist, vulgar and obscene language” and art using “national symbols” to “contravene current legislation.” Government inspectors fine those breaking the law, and confiscate artwork that contravenes the law. Artists are also restricted from selling artwork without government approval.

The law went into effect on December 7, 2018. A group of artists named the San Isidro Movement formed in September 2018 to protest the law.
