= Cubadebate =

Cuban news website

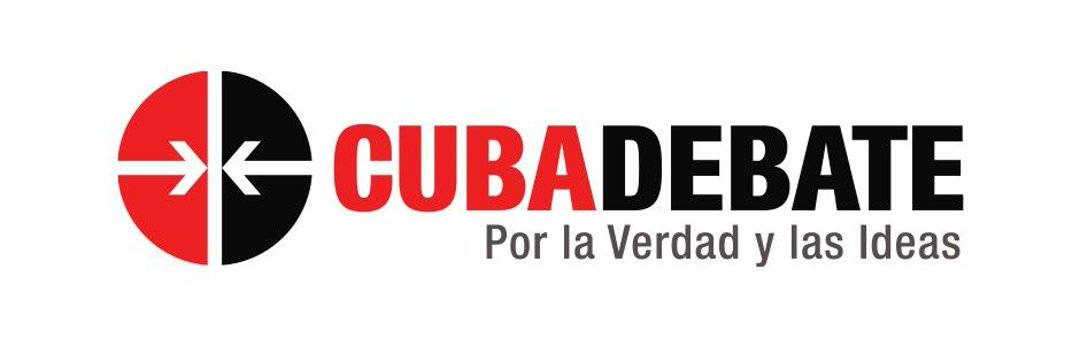
- Established: 2003
- Headquarters: Cuba
- Owner: Ideas Multimedios
- Key people: Randy Alonso Falcón (director)
- Website: www.cubadebate.cu

Cubadebate is a Cuban government-affiliated news and opinion website.

== History and management ==
Cubadebate was founded in 2003 by the "Circle of Journalists Against Terrorism" group. Its launch event was presided over by National Assembly of People's Power president Ricardo Alarcón. It is directed by Randy Alonso Falcón, who also directs the Cuban state television show Mesa Redonda.

In 2011, Cubadebate's YouTube channel was taken down due to an alleged copyright infringement in a video it published about the trial of Cuban exile militant Luis Posada Carriles.

In 2022, Cubadebate became part of the Ideas Multimedios conglomerate, also directed by Alonso Falcón, along with Mesa Redonda and other entities.

== Content ==
Cubadebate is described as a state-affiliated or official media outlet, and has a pro-government editorial line. It was known for publishing the "Reflections" column by Fidel Castro.

The comment section of Cubadebate functions as a forum for Cubans to debate various topics, although there are strict moderation guidelines. In 2016, Cubadebate was the fourth most visited website in Cuba according to Alexa rankings.
