= Freedom of the press in Cuba =

Press freedom is an ongoing issue in Cuba. The country has ranked low on the Press Freedom Index, a list published by Reporters Without Borders which reflects the degree of freedom that journalists, news organisations, and netizens have in a country. Cuba has been ranked among the index's “least free" countries for a decade. In 2016, Amnesty International reported that the re-establishment of diplomatic relations between the United States and Cuba in December 2014 "renewed hope for an end to the US economic embargo, which has had a direct impact on the human rights of ordinary Cubans."

The Cuban constitution recognizes the freedom of the press, and prohibits private ownership of the media. "Only 25 percent of Cubans use the internet, while only five percent of homes are connected", making it one of the Americas' least-connected countries. A number of websites are blocked, and access to information is scarce. Non-governmental organizations, such as Amnesty International, UN Special Rapporteurs, have had their access to Cuba restricted.

On the island, critics of the government and activists often have their mobile and internet connections tapped. Around the time of Pope Benedict XVI's 2012 visit, the government blocked NGO communications from abroad to prevent them from obtaining information on Cuban prisoners.

== Examples ==
According to the Foundation for Human Rights in Cuba, "Cuban citizens are experiencing severe restrictions on their freedom of speech and expression and that extends also to the issue of free press. Independent journalists have had to confront the police many times due to the restrictions they face in the country".

On March 20, 2017, Christian Liberation Movement leader Eduardo Cardet Concepcion was sentenced to three years in prison for criticizing Fidel Castro after Castro's death. According to Cardet, "Castro was a very controversial man, very much hated and rejected by our people."

== Legal environment ==
Cuba has less accessibility to freedom of expression and the press than any other country in the Americas. Laws restrict the freedom of speech. Death sentences, in accordance with Article 91 of the country's penal code, are imposed on journalists or bloggers who act against "the independence or the territorial integrity of the state". Law 88, for the Protection of Cuba’s National Independence and Economy, imposes 7-15 year sentences on those who commit acts "aimed at subverting the internal order of the nation and destroying its political, economic and social system."

Journalists who criticize the president or members of Cuba's Council of State or National Assembly of People's Power can receive up to three years in prison. In accordance with the 1997 Law of National Dignity, members of independent news agencies which send their information to other countries can be sentenced for three to 10 years' imprisonment.

The government removed exit-visa requirements in 2013, and Cubans (particularly journalists and bloggers, including Yoani Sanchez and independent news agency Hablemos Press founder and director Roberto de Jesus Guerra) began traveling abroad. However, Sanchez' foreign travel has been restricted.

== Political environment ==
In December 2014, the United States and Cuba reestablished diplomatic relations after almost 60 years. The Cuban government detained at least three dissidents, including Reinaldo Escobar, before a free-speech demonstration.

== Media ==
Cuba has three national newspapers:

- Granma (Communist Party of Cuba)
- Juventud Rebelde (Young Communist League)
- Trabajadores (Workers' Central Union of Cuba)

The country has four national TV stations:

- Cubavision: The main state broadcaster
- Tele Rebelde: Cuba's second national network
- Canal Caribe: News channel
- Canal Educativo: Educational channel operated by the Cuban Institute of Radio and Television

Cuba's national radio stations are:

- Radio Habana Cuba: Government-run international broadcasting station.
- Radio Rebelde: Music, news and sports.
- Radio Taíno: Tourism.
- Radio Progreso: Family, music and cultural programming.
- Radio Enciclopedia: Instrumental music, news and cultural programming.
- Radio Reloj: All News with time checks each minute. (Reloj means Clock in Spanish.)
