= List of radio stations in Cuba =

This is a list of radio stations in Cuba.

All radio stations in Cuba are owned and operated by the state. The national broadcasting system, Radio Cubana, operates under the Institute of Information and Social Communication (ICS), which replaced the Cuban Institute of Radio and Television (ICRT) in 2021. Radio broadcasting in Cuba began in 1922, when the first station (2LC) began transmissions in Havana. There are approximately 263 AM and 338 FM radio stations in the country. Cuban radio stations use three- or four-letter call signs beginning with "CM". There are no privately owned radio stations in Cuba.

== National networks ==
Radio Cubana operates six national radio networks, each with transmitters across the island on both AM and FM frequencies. The frequencies listed below are the primary Havana frequencies.

| Call sign | Name | FM (MHz) | AM (kHz) | Format | Notes |
|---|---|---|---|---|---|
| CMBA | Radio Rebelde | 96.7 | 670 | News, sports, music | Founded in 1958 by Che Guevara in the Sierra Maestra. Operates 44 FM transmitters covering 98% of the island, plus shortwave on 5025 kHz. |
| CMBC | Radio Progreso | 90.3 | 640 | Entertainment, variety | Known as "La Onda de la Alegría" (The Wave of Joy). Also transmits on shortwave (4765 kHz). |
| CMBD | Radio Reloj | 101.5 | 950 | 24-hour news | Continuous news format with time announcements. Oldest continuously operating 24-hour all-news radio station in the world. |
| CMBV | Radio Taíno | 93.3 | — | Tourism, music | Programming oriented toward tourists, with content in Spanish and other languages. |
| CMBF | Radio Musical Nacional | 95.1 | 590 | Classical music | All-classical and art music station. Shares facilities with Radio Havana Cuba on Avenida Infanta, Havana. |
| CMBQ | Radio Enciclopedia | 94.1 | 530, 1260 | Instrumental music, culture | Broadcasts soft instrumental music with cultural programming. |

== International broadcasting ==
| Call sign | Name | Frequency | Format | Notes |
|---|---|---|---|---|
| — | Radio Havana Cuba | 102.5 FM (Havana), shortwave | International broadcasting | Cuba's official international broadcaster. Transmits in nine languages: Spanish, English, French, Portuguese, Arabic, Quechua, Guarani, Creole, and Esperanto. Founded in 1961. |

== Havana area stations ==
In addition to the national networks, several stations serve the Havana metropolitan area and nearby provinces.

| Call sign | Name | FM (MHz) | AM (kHz) | Province | Notes |
|---|---|---|---|---|---|
| CMCK | Radio COCO | 91.7 | 980 | Havana | Youth-oriented programming. |
| CMBE | Radio Ciudad de la Habana | 94.7 | 820 | Havana | |
| CMBL | Radio Metropolitana | 98.3 | 910 | Havana | |
| CMCH | Radio Cadena Habana | 99.9 | 1080 | Havana | |
| CMBR | Habana Radio | 106.9 | — | Havana | Cultural programming focused on Old Havana. |
| CMCL | Radio Mayabeque | 95.9 | 1040 | Mayabeque | |
| CMAD | Radio Artemisa | 96.1 | 1000 | Artemisa | |
| CMCW | Radio Camoa | 97.9 | — | Mayabeque | Municipal station serving the San José de las Lajas area. |

== Provincial stations ==
Each of Cuba's provinces has at least one principal radio station.

| Call sign | Name | Province | Notes |
|---|---|---|---|
| CMAB | Radio Guamá | Pinar del Río | Multiple transmitters across the province. |
| CMGW | Radio 26 | Matanzas | |
| CMHU | Radio Ciudad del Mar | Cienfuegos | |
| CMHW | CMHW | Villa Clara | Known as "La Reina Radial del Centro" (The Radio Queen of the Centre). |
| — | Radio Sancti Spíritus | Sancti Spíritus | |
| CMJP | Radio Surco | Ciego de Ávila | Known as "Emisora Avileña". |
| — | Radio Cadena Agramonte | Camagüey | |
| — | Radio Victoria | Las Tunas | |
| CMKX | Radio Bayamo | Granma | |
| CMKO | Radio Angulo | Holguín | |
| CMKC | CMKC Radio Revolución | Santiago de Cuba | |
| CMKS | CMKS Radio Trinchera Antimperialista | Guantánamo | Known as "Radio Trinchera" (Trench Radio). |
| — | Radio Caribe | Isla de la Juventud | Serves the special municipality. |

== Foreign broadcasters ==
| Name | Frequency | Notes |
|---|---|---|
| American Forces Network (AFN) | FM | Operates two FM stations at Guantanamo Bay Naval Base for United States military personnel. |
| Radio Martí | 1180 AM (from the United States) | Operated by the United States Agency for Global Media, broadcasting from Florida to Cuba. |

== See also ==
- Media of Cuba
  - Circuito Nacional Cubano
  - CMQ
  - Cuban Institute of Radio and Television
  - Radio Ciudad de La Habana
  - Radio Cubana
  - Radio Havana Cuba
