= Mauricio Lomonte =

Cuban radio announcer and television host

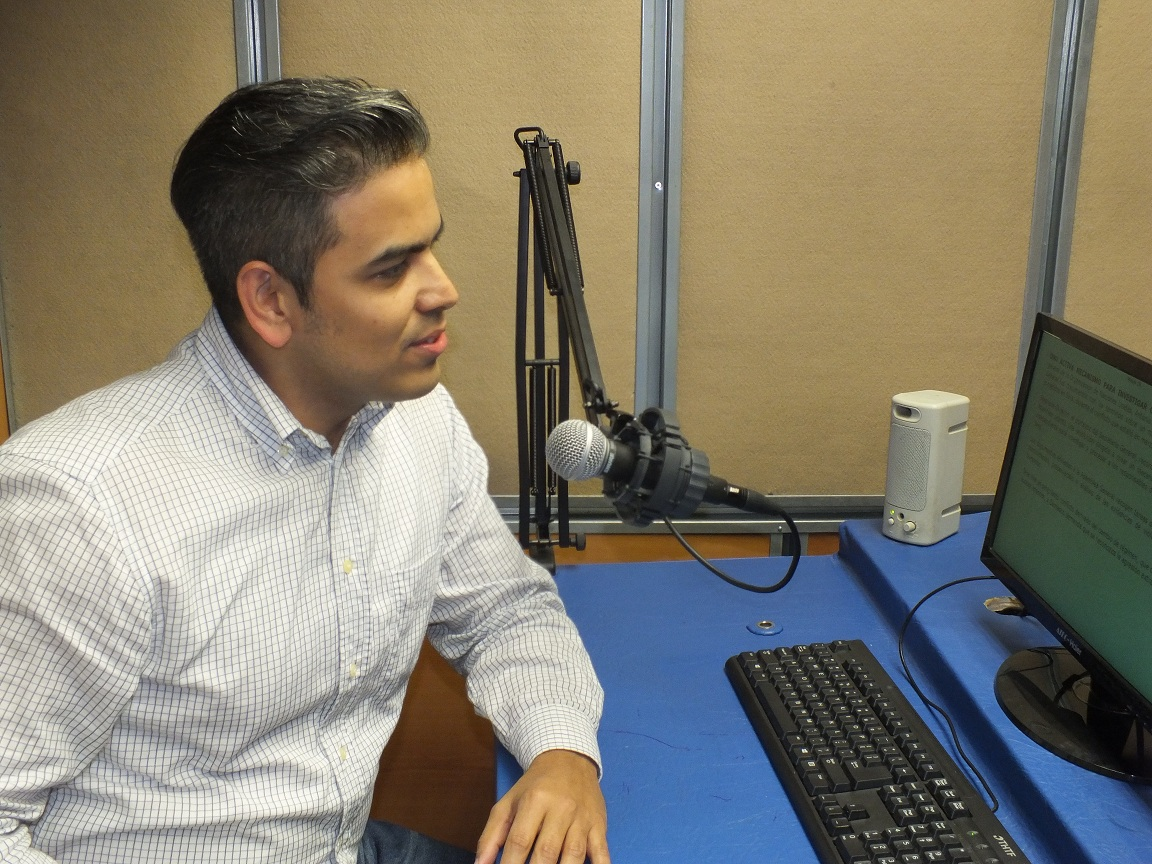
- Mauricio Lomonte on his working day in front of Radio Reloj microphones in 2012
- Born: Mauricio Alberto Lomonte Suárez; 10 June 1982 (age 44); Havana, Cuba
- Other name: Mauro
- Occupations: Announcer; television host; voice actor; radio personality
- Years active: 2000–present
- Known for: Radio broadcasting; TV news broadcasting; cultural TV programs
- Notable work: Announcer or host of: Radio Reloj; De la Gran Escena; Radio Taíno; Radio Progreso

Mauricio Alberto Lomonte Suárez (born 10 June 1982), known professionally as Mauricio Lomonte, is a Cuban radio announcer and television host.

Lomonte started his broadcasting career in 2000 and later branched into television as host. He currently works for various radio stations such as Radio Reloj, Radio Taíno and Radio Progreso. Although he is mainly recognized among the Cuban public for hosting and presenting the television program “De la Gran Escena” since 2014.

== Early life ==
Mauricio Lomonte was born in Havana. He is of Italian descent on his father's side (that is the origin of his surname, Lomonte).

Until the age of one, Lomonte lived with his parents in the Havana municipality of Cerro, then he went to live with his grandmother, who raised and took care of him until he became an adult.

As he said in an interview, he learned to read since a very young age, even then he played at being an announcer without knowing what he was doing, and he always had a very good diction. However, he never participated on school's acts because he was and still is very shy.

It was his grandmother who told Lomonte that his mother had once taken the announcer's tests and had passed them. On the other hand, his father, who immigrated to the United States, told him many times that he is a frustrated announcer.

He attended high school in a boarding school, in the late 1990s, during the time when the Cuban educational system promoted the mandatory program called “pre-university boarding schools in the country side” (currently not applicable) for those who wanted to obtain a high school's degree.

== Career ==
=== 2000–2014: Beginnings and breakthrough ===
Lomonte was only 17 years old when Tony Reytor, a voice over professional working for the COCO broadcasting station, told him: “Boy, you should exploit that voice of yours”. That's how he started working as an assistant of direction in that radio station, although without approaching a microphone whatsoever.

He enrolled himself in workshops and voice over courses, which he never missed. During the year 2000 he debuted in cultural and informational spaces. He also worked with Marelis Plasencia, playing the role of Manuel Mendive in a cultural program with the help of Nelson Moreno.

He found his talent with great voice over masters such as Antonio Pera and Ángel Hernández Calderín.

By then, he replaced the announcer of the Música Viva show in Radio Rebelde, but he recognizes that at the beginning of that experience he was not good because he talked too fast. Then, he was recommended to work in Radio Reloj, where he started in January 2001. He agrees with some other colleagues who think of that radio station as the real school to form voice over professionals. At the age of 18, everybody was telling him he could become a great radio announcer, it was all in his effort to succeed. He remembers in such way two great teachers: Ibrahím Aput and Laureano Céspedes.

His first shift in Radio Reloj was after midnight, about that he explained: “it was hard work, all the news had to be said in a minute and you need a good sense of synthesis”. He had a lot of help during that time from Luis Alarcón Santana, which made him read out loud and listen to Radio Reloj, where he still works.

On November 13, 2010, fumigation was carried out to control a plague of mice in a cafeteria called La Arcada, next to the Cuban Institute of Radio and Television, but the fumigation gas entered the Radio Reloj booth through the air conditioning. Due to this, it was necessary to evict all the workers from the ICRT building during the morning. Lomonte had to be taken to an emergency medical room due to inhalation of the gas and was later released. The firefighters evacuated the building while several ICRT employees, with eye and throat discomfort, had to receive oxygen. The Radio Reloj announcers were temporarily moved to the Radio Rebelde booths until what happened was clarified. The incident was investigated by the police authorities. Although versions of a possible sabotage initially circulated, the evidence found in the place seemed to rule out that option.

During an interview made almost eighteen years after he started working in Radio Reloj, he said about his job: “It's hard work, because other than knowing the extent of this radio station, you have to talk for an entire hour, reading the news at first sight, without some preparation first, it takes a lot from the announcers, that's why it needs a lot of experience, focus and interpretation when being on air”.

Lomonte's career was bolstered when after participating on a TV casting, he was selected as an news anchor for the third emission of the National Television Newscast (NTV), at the same time he began working on Close Caption and signed up for the sign languages courses for the deaf and hypoacustic (hard of hearing) people.

=== 2014–present: Success and rise to television with “De la Gran Escena” ===
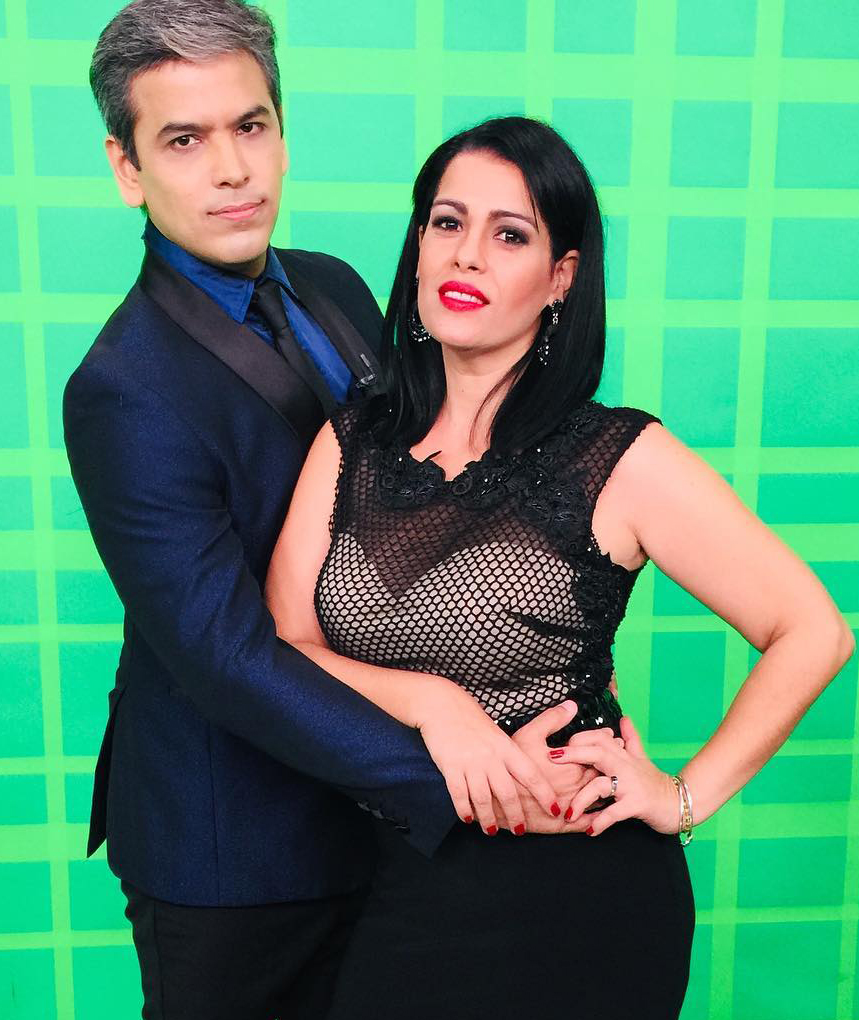
Mauricio Lomonte and Náyade Rivero in a greenscreen room, during a taping of De la Gran Escena on Cuban Institute of Radio and Television in 2020.

In 2014, Lomonte gained further recognition and he achieved his definite promotion to television screen in the program called De la Gran Escena, when the previous host, Niro de la Rúa, left the program. Mauricio was accepted as a substitute for de la Rúa in that television program by its director, José Ramón Artigas.

Lomonte also is a member to the Radio Rebelde staff, specifically the newscast Portada Rebelde. On television he was seen on the newscast Buenos Días and in specialized news broadcasting. His voice was frequently used on the program Cartelera until November, 2018; as well as audiovisual materials processed by the Dubbing Department of Cuban television.

He has been the host for some national festivals as the Peasant Music Contest called Eduardo Saborit and he usually provides his voice to some different television commercials and other materials from Cuba and other countries.

He currently works for Canal Habana and the ANSOC newscast, which broadcasts from Monday to Friday on Cubavisión.

On Radio Progreso, Lomonte hosts the Aires de España program. It's directed by José María Rodríguez Alonso and in it, they cover the regions of Spain, its history, culture and people.

Since 2011, he has been hosting SOS Planeta, a radio program that gives alerts about damage to the ecosystem and the danger they pose to biodiversity. It also covers other subjects related to art, philosophy, economy, history trivia and general knowledge. From this radio program, Lomonte also covers news and talks frequently about the COVID-19 pandemic, including the latest advances in related scientific investigations. The SOS Planeta program is broadcast by Radio Taíno, the FM of Cuba.

== Views on his profession ==
Lomonte has stated that to him locution is "to show yourself as you are, know how to reach those who will listen to you and above all, you have to be humble, simple and receptive, give your best and know how to reach your audience”.

“I have always thought that the voice over, in addition to being an important specialty for the listener or viewer, also constitutes an art like acting. I say this because a well-pronounced news or comment reaches the listener or viewer right away”.

== Personal life ==
Mauricio Lomonte is openly homosexual.

In May 2019, Lomonte's half-brother, named Luis Ernesto, was shot and killed at the age of 39 by a police officer during an altercation in which SWAT security forces raided his home in Davie, Florida. During the standoff, Luis Ernesto had posted a video on YouTube showing him sitting in front of a screen with multiple surveillance cameras, saying they showed officers outside his home; while his girlfriend, who was in the house with him, also posted a video on Facebook, saying she and her boyfriend had been bothered by neighbors before police arrived, and also claiming that police were trying to shoot them.
