= Los Brito =

Cuban vocal quartet

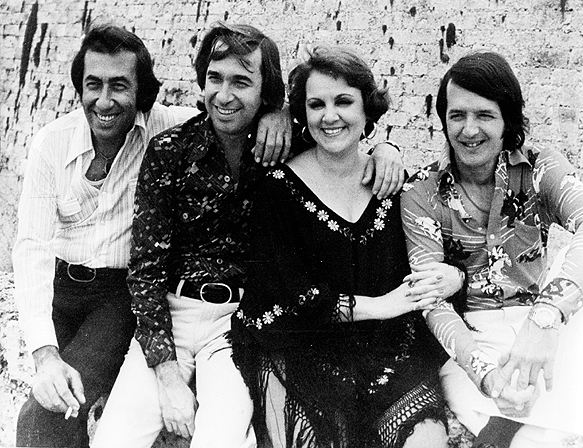
- Cuarteto Los Brito
- Musical career
- Origin: Havana, Cuba
- Genres: Pop; Fusion; Singer-songwriter; Cuban music
- Instruments: Voice; Vocal Cuartet
- Works: See the Discography section of this article.
- Years active: 1967–1983
- Labels: EGREM; Areito; Sony Music
- Members: Mercy Díaz, Alfredo Brito, Julio Brito, Abelardo Cordero.
- Past members: Pedro Sánchez "El Nene"

Notes
- Related artists: Julio Brito Ibáñez; Rosita Fornés; Yolanda Brito; Juan Formell; Daymé Arocena

Los Brito was a vocal quartet formed in 1967 in Havana, Cuba. They became one of the most popular Cuban groups in the late 1960s and maintained this status until the 1980s, when they retired from the stage. They are considered pioneers of the fusion of traditional Cuban rhythms with foreign musical styles.

== Beginnings ==
Los Brito was born from an idea of Alfredo Brito, musical director of the quartet. Julio Brito, Alfredo's brother, joins the project and they start looking for the other two members, while both compose the repertoire and Alfredo is in charge of the arrangements.

They start rehearsing without the main voice, at the house of another singer, Abelardo Busch, who was going to be the fourth member.

In 1967, thanks to Mariana de Gonitch who introduced them to her student Mercy Díaz, the quartet was formed to start their career, but at that time, Abelardo Busch decided not to continue.

It was then when they were joined by Pedro Humberto Sánchez "El Nene", who had been part of another vocal quartet: Los Ayala.

Los Brito's first formation consisted of: Mercy Díaz (lead vocals), Alfredo Brito, Julio Brito y Pedro Sánchez “El Nene”.

== Debut ==
Los Brito made their official debut in mid-1967 in the Cuban television program "Música y estrellas", directed by Manolo Rifat and hosted by Eva Rodríguez.

They performed the song "Matías Pérez", by Alfredo Brito, which tells the story of Matías Pérez, who, according to popular tradition, made a balloon trip from which he never returned. The song, in a humorous tone, compares him to a cosmonaut.

"Matías Pérez", ‘whose good rhythm did a lot for Los Brito’, is immediately accepted by the public.

Later, "Matías Pérez" is also interpreted by Yolanda Brito (no family relation to the Brito brothers). Cuban television makes "a science fiction production" in which the singer ascends in a balloon.

In December 1968, when the quartet begins to consolidate its initial success, Pedro Sánchez "El Nene" dies.

== Second stage ==
After Pedro's passing, Los Brito devoted themselves exclusively to rehearsing repertoire.

A few months later, in 1969, they were joined by Abelardo Cordero, a native of Holguín and former member of "Los Century", who at that time was doing his compulsory military service.

Given the need to rehearse, Los Brito toured the Oriente, performing for MINFAR during the two months that remained for Abelardo to finish his military service, touring the units, polishing their show and repertoire with the reactions of the audience.

For that tour they prepare several premieres: "Para los dos" and "Dame, dame" by Alfredo Brito; "Llueve" by Julio Brito Jr. The most important songs in their repertoire at that time are: "Matías Pérez" by Alfredo Brito; "Tutankamen", by Julio Brito Jr; "Rumbo al jamás" also by Julio; "Lo material" by Juan Formell and "Quisiera" by Alfredo Brito.

== Radio, Television and Concerts ==
From 1967 to 1983, during the 16 years they remained active, Los Brito consolidated themselves as artists, maintaining a constant presence in the Cuban media (press, radio and television).

=== Radio ===
They usually perform in radio programs and radio stations such as: Radio Rebelde, Radio Van Van, Sorpresa, Festival, El Cordón de La Habana, Radio Cadena o Nocturno (Radio Progreso).

=== Television ===
After finishing the course at the "Music Development and Programming Center", Los Brito starred in a "Recital", a Cuban television program directed by Manolo Rifat and presented by Eva Rodríguez, which was on the air for 20 years.

They become very familiar faces in Cuban television, acting in programs "that had a vast audience" such as: Buenas Tardes, De repente en TV, Pantalla Mágica, De Viernes a Viernes o Juntos a Las Nueve.

They actively participated in the children's television programs Sábado 37, Variedades Infantiles y Juguete, singing and performing songs such as El gatico Ferrufin, Carpintero o El Ratón Barrigón.

=== Concerts ===
They toured the Oriente for two months (see Second stage).

They perform in lodges of the sugar mills and also in the shelters of the schools as part of their presentation in the Zafra de los diez millones.

They give concerts in numerous night clubs in Havana, such as: Copa Room del Havana Riviera, Tropicana, Parisién, Habana Libre, etc.

In 1970, thanks to their popularity, Los Brito were chosen by popular vote to represent Cuba in the "II Festival Internacional de la Canción Popular Varadero 70". On the eleventh day of the festival, Wednesday, November 18, 1970, Los Brito are very well received with their song: "Con un sueño entre las manos".

In 1983, the quartet disbands.

== Cultural legacy ==
Los Brito managed to consolidate themselves as a vocal group of excellence in Cuban music.

Among the many songs of the quartet that were hits of the time are: "El Banquito", "Y después se perdió", "Cabellos negros", "Poco a poco", "El 4-5-6", "Cuando llego a mi casa", "El soñador", "Noche de fiesta" or "Quiéreme un poquito". Most of the songs they performed were written by Alfredo Brito and his brother Julio Brito.

They stood out for their mixture of pop with purely Cuban rhythms. They are considered one of the pioneers of this fusion of Cuban and foreign music.

In 2016, Cuban singer Daymé Arocena covered the Los Brito song "El 4-5-6", within her second studio album "One takes".

On August 20, 2022, journalist Osvaldo Rojas Garay begins his article in the newspaper Vanguardia (Villa Clara, Cuba), about the Cuban volleyball team, quoting the song "El soñador" by Los Brito.

== Discography ==
Some song and recordings by Los Brito:

- Matías Pérez – Author: Alfredo Brito Gamba (ICRT Orchestra)
- Si te nace una flor – Author: Alfredo Brito Gamba (EGREM Records under Exclusive License to Sony Music Entertainment Spain, S.L.)
- Poco a poco mi compay – Author: Alfredo Brito Gamba (EGREM Records under Exclusive License to Sony Music Entertainment Spain, S.L.)
- Tú lo has querido así – Author: Alfredo Brito Gamba (ICRT Orchestra)
- El tiempo feliz – Author: Alfredo Brito Gamba (EGREM Records under Exclusive License to Sony Music Entertainment Spain, S.L.)
- Dime que sientes cuando hablas de mí – Author: Alfredo Brito Gamba (EGREM Records under Exclusive License to Sony Music Entertainment Spain, S.L.)
- Tema para una noche de bodas – Author: Alfredo Brito Gamba (EGREM Records under Exclusive License to Sony Music Entertainment Spain, S.L.)
- Cuando llego a mi casa – Author: Alfredo Brito Gamba (EGREM Records under Exclusive License to Sony Music Entertainment Spain, S.L.)
- Quiéreme un poquito – Author: Alfredo Brito Gamba (EGREM Records)
- Un viaje sin retorno ni partida – Author: Alfredo Brito Gamba (EGREM Records)
- Ellos – Author: Alfredo Brito Gamba (EGREM Records)
- El soñador – Author: Julio Brito Gamba (Areito)
- Vas a acordarte de mi – Authors: Alfredo Brito Gamba and Julio Brito Gamba (EGREM Records under Exclusive License to Sony Music Entertainment Spain, S.L.)
- Canción para la que tanto amé – Author: Alfredo Brito Gamba (EGREM Records under Exclusive License to Sony Music Entertainment Spain, S.L.)
- El 4-5-6 – Authors: Alfredo Brito Gamba and Julio Brito Gamba (EGREM Records under Exclusive License to Sony Music Entertainment Spain, S.L.)
- Cuando te acuerdes de mí – Author: Julio Brito Ibáñez (ICRT Orchestra)
- Érase una vez – Alfredo Brito Gamba (ICRT Orchestra)
- Con un sueño entre las manos – Authors: Alfredo Brito Gamba and Julio Brito Gamba (Areito)
- Así quiéreme – Author: Alfredo Brito Gamba (EGREM Records)
- Cabellos Negros – Author: Julio Brito Gamba (EGREM Records under Exclusive License to Sony Music Entertainment Spain, S.L.)
- Ven, vamos a caminar – Author: Alfredo Brito Gamba (ICRT Orchestra)
- La larga espera – Author: Julio Brito Gamba (EGREM Records under Exclusive License to Sony Music Entertainment Spain, S.L.)
- Y tal vez mañana – Author: Julio Brito Gamba (EGREM Records under Exclusive License to Sony Music Entertainment Spain, S.L.)
- Noche de fiesta – Author: Julio Brito Gamba (ICRT Orchestra)
- El banquito – Authors: Alfredo Brito Gamba and Julio Brito Gamba (Areito)
- El eco de un amor – Author: Julio Brito Gamba (ICRT Orchestra)
- Di qué ha sido – Author: Kiko Rodríguez (Areito)
- Soy feliz si estoy junto a ti – Author: Julio Brito Ibáñez (Areito)
- Por una sola vez – Author: Julio Brito Ibáñez (ICRT Orchestra)
- Mariela – Author: Alfredo Brito Gamba (ICRT Orchestra)
- Solamente un hasta luego – Author: Alfredo Brito Gamba (ICRT Orchestra)
- Tiernamente, para siempre – Author: Alfredo Brito Gamba (ICRT Orchestra)
- Canta trovador – Author: Alfredo Brito Gamba (ICRT Orchestra)
- Pepilla – Author: Alfredo Brito Gamba (ICRT Orchestra)
- Ferrufín – Children's Song – Author: Julio Brito Ibáñez (ICRT Orchestra)
- El Fosforito – Children's Song – Author: Mercy Díaz (ICRT Orchestra)
- Guillermo Tell – Children's Song – Author: Alfredo Brito Gamba (ICRT Orchestra)
- Este vacío de ti – Author: Alfredo Brito Gamba (ICRT Orchestra)
- Otro Bossa Nova – Author: Alfredo Brito Gamba (Modern Music of Oriente Orchestra)
- Ven Ya – Author: Alfredo Brito Gamba (Modern Music of Oriente Orchestra)
- Canción de Jim Hawkins – Children's Song – Author: Julio Brito Gamba (ICRT Orchestra)
- El ratón Barrigón – Children's Song – Author: Alfredo Brito Gamba (music) and Julio Brito Gamba (lyrics) (ICRT Orchestra)
- Tutankamen I – Author: Alfredo Brito Gamba (ICRT Orchestra)
- Tutankamen II – Author: Alfredo Brito Gamba (ICRT Orchestra)
- El cochecito – Author: Alfredo Brito Gamba (ICRT Orchestra)
- Llueve – Author: Julio Brito Gamba (ICRT Orchestra)
- Soy un hombre – Author: Julio Brito Gamba (ICRT Orchestra)
- Para los dos – Author: Alfredo Brito Gamba (ICRT Orchestra)
- Dame, dame – Author: Alfredo Brito Gamba (ICRT Orchestra)
- Rumbo al jamás – Author: Julio Brito Gamba (ICRT Orchestra)
- Quisiera – Author: Alfredo Brito Gamba (ICRT Orchestra)
- Dime qué harás – Author: Alfredo Brito Gamba (ICRT Orchestra)
- Camino del Viejo Río – Author: Alfredo Brito Gamba (ICRT Orchestra)
- Me estremeces – Author: Alberto Herrero (ICRT Orchestra)
- Lo material – Author: Juan Formell (ICRT Orchestra)
- Meditación a una flor – Author: Ariel Alfonso (ICRT Orchestra)
- Deja – Author: Alfredo Brito Gamba (ICRT Orchestra)
- Mensaje – Author: Julio Brito Gamba (ICRT Orchestra)
- ¡Oh, cuánto tiempo! – Author: Alfredo Brito Gamba (ICRT Orchestra)
- Y después se perdió – Author: Alfredo Brito Gamba (ICRT Orchestra)

== Bibliography ==
- Díaz Ayala, Cristóbal (1981). Música Cubana (del Areito a la Nueva Trova) [Cuban Music (from Areito to Nueva Trova)] (in Spanish). Puerto Rico: Editorial Cubanacan. ISBN 0897297032.
- Quiroga, Orlando (1970-06-12). "Busque a "Los Brito" para que le canten un cuento" [Look for “Los Brito” to sing you a story.] (PDF). Bohemia (in Spanish). Havana, Cuba. p. 50 (of the PDF).
- Pages, Eduardo (1969-04-11). "Cuatro voces en busca del éxito" [Four voices in search of success] (PDF). Bohemia (in Spanish). Havana, Cuba. p. 29 (of the PDF).
- "Bibliografía Cubana Tomo II (1979)" [Cuban Bibliography Volume II (1979)] (PDF). Bibliografía Cubana Tomo II (1979) (in Spanish). La Habana, Cuba: Ministerio de Cultura (Biblioteca Nacional "José Martí"). 1982. p. 73.
