= Maylin Legañoa =

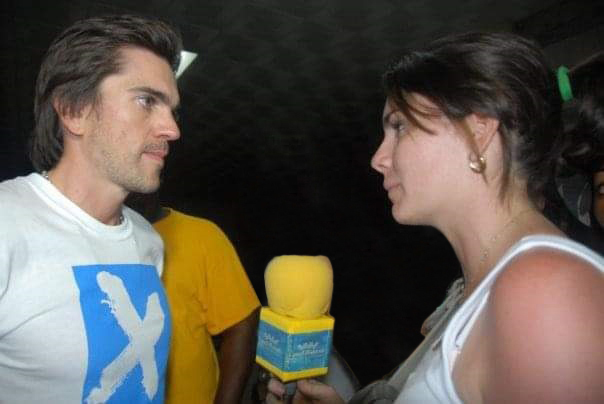
- Maylin Legañoa interviewing singer Juanes during the Paz sin Fronteras II concert in 2009
- Born: May 8, 1984 (age 42); Cienfuegos, Cuba
- Citizenship: Cuba; United States
- Education: University of Havana
- Occupations: Journalist; reporter; news anchor
- Years active: 2007–present
- Notable credits: Libre Acceso (2009–2011); Vitrales (2009–2014); Travesía (2009–2014); De la Gran Escena (2014); WJAN América Tevé (2015); Noticias Telemundo (2015–present)
- Children: 2

Maylin Legañoa (born May 8, 1984) is a Cuban and American journalist, reporter, and news anchor. She has also occasionally worked as a screenwriter and director.

== Career ==
Maylin Legañoa was born on May 8, 1984, in the city of Cienfuegos. She later moved to Havana, where she began her studies at the University of Havana in 2002, graduating in 2007 with a degree in journalism. She also pursued postgraduate studies, earning a master's degree in Audiovisual Production from the Faculty of Audiovisual Media Arts, part of the Higher Institute of Art (ISA).

Shortly after graduating, Legañoa began her work in audiovisual media in 2007 at Canal Habana of the Cuban Institute of Radio and Television as a news reporter. She was later hired in 2009 as a television presenter for the program Vitrales, broadcast on Cubavisión International, which covered cultural topics. She remained the main presenter of that program for five years.

In early 2014, Legañoa was offered the position of presenter on the music program called De la Gran Escena on the Cubavisión channel, replacing the previous presenter, María Victoria Gil. Legañoa performed these duties while simultaneously working at Canal Habana, where she also served as a scriptwriter and director of the program Travesía, which she also presented. This program explored history and interesting facts, with each episode focusing on a different topic and blending history with art. From 2009 to 2011, she also worked at Canal Habana as an investigative journalist on the program Libre Acceso, where she produced reports on social issues. During this time, she received recognition from the Union of Journalists of Cuba for her journalistic work.

After moving to the United States, she also worked from March 2015 to September of the same year as a reporter and anchor for the morning news program at WJAN América Tevé in Miami, and later joined the Telemundo 51 team, where she still works. Currently, Legañoa is a news reporter for Noticiero Telemundo 51. As part of the Noticiero Telemundo 51 team, Legañoa reports breaking news and other important stories for viewers in the Miami-Fort Lauderdale area.

== Personal life ==
Legañoa is married and has two children. In 2020, she became a U.S. citizen, and regarding this event, she expressed: “2020 has been a difficult, sad, and dangerous year… But almost at its end, it has given me the dream so longed for by so many immigrants. Today I received my naturalization as a citizen of this great country.”

She has also stated that her work as a local reporter brings her very close to the community. "In a way, those viewers, those followers, are an undeniable part of your family, because you're involving them by sharing photos and videos, and also commenting and talking with them."

During her pregnancy leave from the Telemundo news station, she maintained that she didn't feel disconnected from the viewers who follow her on social media or who encounter her on the streets of Miami, saying: "I think that connection with the viewers is like a drug, it's adrenaline; you need it, especially when you love and enjoy this profession."

== Awards ==
- Emmy Award in the Talent Reporter Daily News category (2021)
- Emmy Award in the Politics/Government News category for the series "Neither Dry Nor Wet" (2021)
- Emmy Award in the Newscast Evening Larger Markets category (2021)
- Florida News Award in the Breaking News/Individual category for "I Just Want My Son Back" (2022)
- Sunshine State Award, 2nd place in Best Special Report in TV/Radio/Video/Podcast for "My Phone Is Listening to Me"
- Sunshine State Award, 3rd place in Best Breaking News Coverage TV/Radio/Digital for "Man Barricaded in Hialeah Endangers Children's Lives"
