= Television in Cuba =

Cuba was the first Latin American country to begin television testing in December 1946 when station CM-21P conducted an experimental multi-point live broadcast. The first regular commercial broadcasting began in October 1950 by the small radio station Union Radio, soon followed by other stations. The broadcasts featured sport, soap operas, news, cooking shows, and comedy. Censorship was imposed following the 1952 coup by Fulgencio Batista, and again by the government of the Cuban revolution after their victory in 1959.

In 1958, Cuba was the second country in the world (after the United States) to begin color broadcasting. It was suspended the next year following the Cuban Revolution, not returning until 1975.

In 2022, Cuba has five national television channels, four digital-only and four HD digital television channel and a number of provincial channels, and also some municipality channels broadcasting at least 2 hours by day. All are under the control of the new Cuban Institute for Information and Social Communication, replacing in 2021 the old Cuban Institute of Radio and Television (ICRT).

== History ==
=== 1950–1959 ===
Commercial television arrived in Cuba on October 25, 1950, the first in the Caribbean and second in Latin America. In the 1940s, Cuba's two largest radio stations, CMQ (which had begun testing in 1946) and RHC-Cadena Azul, announced they would soon start broadcasting television. Since building TV stations and broadcast networks from scratch was extremely expensive and complex, it took longer than expected.

They were both beaten to the air by the tiny radio station, Union Radio. Gaspar Pumarejo, owner of Union Radio, built the new station in the Havana home and garage of a family named Mestre. Pumarejo set the inauguration of his TV station for October 24, 1950, which was Journalists Day in Cuba. After honoring the journalist, Cuba's President Carlos Prío Socarrás was shown mugging it up for the camera and playing the role of cameraman. After this event Union Radio's slogan became Union Radio, primera en televisión, primera en popularidad ("Union Radio, first in television, first in popularity"). Union Radio was quickly followed by CMQ Television, which officially launched with its first broadcasts on December 18, 1950. Televisión del Caribe, owned by Storer Broadcasting, began broadcasting in 1953, though it already faced administrative problems in 1954.

==== Variety of shows ====
One of the first shows broadcast on Union TV was live coverage of Cuban League baseball games beginning with the 1950-51 season. This was the first of many memorable seasons that would tie television to the Cuban baseball scene and would establish the game as Cuba's national pastime.

"In late October, the station carried the first of what would be regular Cuban Winter League Baseball Games. A crew drove to the stadium in a remote-control truck. The broadcasts were beamed to the Mestre's house by microwave, where they were rebroadcast. Cameramen were positioned at first base and home plate. The station's third camera remained in the house until newsman Alberto Gandero finished his newscast. After the newscast, the third camera was carried to the stadium by taxi and positioned near third base."

Soap operas ("telenovelas"), news, cooking shows, comedy shows and musical variety were shown. After Union Radio TV went on the air, Cuban demand for television sets soared. Luckily Cuban broadcasting coincided with a glut of sets in the US market. Despite the high cost, ranging $350 for a 16" set to $2,000 for a 30" set, the Cuban government's Imports and Exports Analysis Agency estimated that Cubans had imported more than 100,000 television receivers by 1952.

==== Social and political aspects ====
From its inception, Cuban television played a huge part in the social and political fiber of Cuban life. Extensive discussions about television began to unfold in the radio and entertainment sections of Cuban newspapers and magazines in the year leading up to October 14, 1950, the day Union Radio TV became the first television station to broadcast in Havana. Critics believed that US television set a level of excellence that they wanted to uphold. They believed the medium's primary purpose in Cuba would be to enhance the "high culture" education of the Cuban citizen.

==== Censorship under Batista ====
On March 10, 1952 following Fulgencio Batista's successful coup, he sent for representatives of the media and imposed censorship. Though it was supposed to be temporary it wasn't until Journalists' Day, October 24, 1953 that the censorship was supposedly lifted. In truth the censorship became even harsher after Fidel Castro's July 26, 1953 attack on Moncada Barracks. Stations could be fined or shut down for various infractions. On March 14, 1953, CMCH-Radio Cadena Habana permitted a criticism of the coup. The station was immediately occupied by government soldiers.

The media learned to operate within the parameters of the censorship. In late 1957, Circuito Nacional Cubano, a station purported to be secretly owned by Batista, broadcast a fictional program called El Dictador De Valle Azul. It starred Rolando Leyva as the rebel leader Taguary, who, with his group of men, roamed the Blue Valley and helped the people fight the valley's evil dictator in each episode. The comparisons with the dictator Batista and the rebel leader Castro were unmistakable. The government's failure to recognize the satire only made it appear inept as well as tyrannical.

Moral censorship also increased under Batista. There was a move towards more family friendly broadcasts and less sexually provocative variety shows. In particular these were the rumba and mambo-inspired dances and more specifically the female dancers.

On March 19, 1958, Gaspar Pumarejo once more made history at the inauguration of TELECOLOR S.A., on Channel 12, transmitting up to 16 hours a day of color programming. It was a commercial television station with studios located in the brand new and central Hotel Habana Hilton - now Habana Libre, which used the US NTSC system. It was the first ever color station in Cuba and Latin America.

=== 1960s-70s: Nationalization and expansion ===
Following the Cuban Revolution's conclusion in 1959, the Fidel Castro-led 26th of July Movement government began the process of forming a national television network, at the cost of the private operators. That year, Channel 11 serving Camagüey City was launched, the first ever provincial television station.

In 1960, the Cuban government purchased CMQ Channel 6 from its owners, becoming simply Channel 6 (Canal 6), the flagship channel owned and operated by the Government of the Republic thru the Bureau of Broadcasting, Ministry of Communications. A year later, the government ended all commercial advertising on Channel 6, as well as the remaining private channels 4 and 2. Channel 2 was later on purchased and reformatted under new owners Cuban Institute of Radio and Television in 1962, which had already become Channel 6's owner and operator. The CIRT was established that year as the official government agency for radio and television, as well as the holding company for radio and television operations within Cuba, acting as the representative of the National Government and the Communist Party of Cuba in mass media affairs provided that its broadcasts are aligned with its purpose of building a socialist and progressive Cuba and as representative of the country's socialist values, infused with the long history of struggle against aggression. These included news programming (produced by subsidiary Sistema Informativo de la Television Cubana, which also provides news reporters and presenters for these programs), current affairs, sports (including the flagship Cuban National Series launched on Channel 6 in 1961) and entertainment, including music, variety programming and drama series.

In 1961 the flagship news program, Noticiero National de Television Cubana - Edicion Estelar, officially made its television premiere on Channel 6. The next year CIRT, thru the Sistema Informativo subsidiary, took over its production.

In 1968 the CIRT launched a new station, Tele Rebelde, with regional programming for the then Oriente province with studios in Santiago de Cuba.

In 1975, Channel 2 Havana and Tele Rebelde became the first stations to be broadcast using the US NTSC color system since 1958, thereby finishing what Gaspar Pumarejo had done before. In 1979, Tele Rebelde's main studios were moved to Havana with the opening of its national headquarters, and with that Channel 2 was merged with the former station, making it a nationally broadcast network together with Channel 6. The combined network was given the Tele Rebelde brand in 1982.

=== 1980s: The birth of regional television and international reach ===
In 1984, the CIRT began forming, on the basis of the Channel 6 and Tele Rebelde regional repeater stations outside Havana City, a regional television service made up of a number of provincial telecentros, television stations based in each of the provincial capital cities. The regional repeater channels system was born in 1967 as an effort to bring Channel 6's national programming (and later on Tele Rebelde productions) to provincial viewers, with the provincial repeaters also providing regional opt-outs and occasionally national programming produced for the two networks. Camagüey was the first province to sign on to regional television, when Televisión Camagüey officially began broadcasting on July 29 the same year, this time on the Channel 4 frequency. On April 29, 1986, the regional service of Tele Rebelde for the by now province of Santiago de Cuba was relaunched as a separate station, Tele Turqino. In 1990, what is now Canal Habana as launched as a partnership between CIRT and the University of Havana.

The 1980s also saw the beginning of international broadcasts by the CIRT bringing Cuban television programming overseas as well as providing an outlet to Cuban culture (including music and the arts). In 1986, beating the Warsaw Pact, Nicaragua and the socialist republics of East Asia, Cubavision International, then simply Cubavision, was launched to bring Channel 6 and Tele Rebelde programming to millions of satellite (and later on cable) viewers in the United States, Canada, Puerto Rico, the rest of the Caribbean and mainland Central America.

In 1989, buoyed by the success of the international service, Channel 6 and Cubavisión were relaunched as Cubavision and Cubavisión International respectively. In December 1989, with the channel rename, Cubavisión released an ultra-modern CGI identity card featuring the José Martí Memorial, with the Channel 6 logo placed on the left of the memorial. Tele Rebelde also had a similar modern CGI ident launched at the same time, featuring the tropical forests and rivers of the Sierra Maestra.

=== 1990s: Community television begins ===
While the Special Period dealt an immense blow to Cuban television production, 1993 saw the birth of the country's first community TV channel, Televisión Serrana. Signing on in 1993, with assistance from UNESCO and later on the ICRT, it was the first channel of its kind in Cuba, serving as a documentary and current affairs channel with studios in Buey Arriba, Granma, aimed at showcasing the culture and traditions of the Sierra Maestra. Its ground breaking documentaries and short films proved to be a gamechanger indeed for the Cuban TV industry.

=== 2000s: Modernization ===
ICRT marked the Golden Jubilee of Cuban Television in October 2000.

In 2002, Canal Educativo, the country's first educational and family TV station in the vein of PBS in the United States, was launched. This channel expanded Cubavision's educational programming, as well as its family-friendly programs on that channel and Tele Rebelde.

In 2008, Multivision, a general entertainment and educational channel, began broadcasts. At first the channel was only a blocktimer by the CIRT aired on the provincial TV stations, as well as within Havana, during broadcast hours without any local productions before it moved to the Channel 14 frequency in 2009 (with a secondary feed on Channel 69).

In 2017, a new all digital TV station, also state-owned and run and called Canal Caribe was started as "an attempt to stand out from the stiffly presented, heavily scripted newscasts that have aired on state TV for decades."

A month following the July 11 protests in 2021, Cuba's state media announced a new political program called Con Filo that was designed to push back against international "media manipulation" surrounding Cuba.

=== Censorship under the Communist government ===
All Cuban media, including television, are tightly controlled and censored by the Cuban government led by the Communist Party of Cuba (PCC). Private ownership of broadcast media is prohibited, and the Cuban government, thru the CIRT, is owner and operator of the national TV channels, in regional stations the CIRT is co-owner with the provincial and town/city governments that help operate their respective stations.

In the most recent case, in 2020 Cuban television comedian Andy Vázquez, part of Cuban television's most popular show, Vivir del cuento, was fired, and subsequently "had to escape" (in reality flying legally to Miami from Cuba) as a result of an unapproved humorous skit recorded by Vázquez as a private video using his tv character to criticize the government. In an August 2019 article published in the official newspaper of the Communist Party of Cuba, Vázquez was reprimanded for "portraying official authorities in a negative light." But the program Vivir del cuento, where Vázquez was a non-principal character, continues its broadcast.

In 2021 the CIRT was replaced by a new governing board, the Cuban Institute for Information and Social Communication, as the new holding firm of the Cuban television service.

== List ==
The following is a list of all television stations in Cuba:

=== Available in non-digital/digital TV ===
- Cubavisión (Canal 6) – State broadcaster
  - Cubavision International – Satellite service of Cubavision, broadcasting internationally
- Tele Rebelde (Canal 2) - State broadcaster focused mainly in sports content.
- Canal Educativo
- Canal Educativo 2 - Broadcasting Telesur channel
- Multivisión

=== Only Digital TV Channels ===
- Canal Clave - Digital-only music channel.
- Canal Caribe (founded in 2017; Cuba's first Digital-only news channel)
- Canal Habana (est. 2006) (also non-digital signal in Havana)

=== HD digital Channels ===
- Cubavisión HD
- Tele Rebelde HD
- RT en Español

=== Provincial stations outside Havana ===
- Tele Pinar (Pinar del Río)
- ArTV (Artemisa)
- Tele Mayabeque (San José de las Lajas)
- Islavisión (Isla de la Juventud)
- TV Yumuri (Matanzas)
- Tele Cubanacan (Santa Clara)
- Perlavisión (Cienfuegos)
- Centrovisión (Sancti Spíritus)
- TV Avileña (Ciego de Ávila)
- TV Camagüey (Camagüey)
- Tunasvisión (Las Tunas)
- Tele Cristal (Holguín)
- CNCTV (Bayamo)
- Tele Turquino (Santiago de Cuba)
- Televisión Serrana (San Pablo de Yao)
- Solvisión (Guantánamo)

The United States Armed Forces operate a television station to serve the troops at Guantanamo Bay:

- NBW 8 (AFN), Military station of Guantanamo Bay

=== Municipal and city television stations ===
- Sandinovisión( Sandino )
- Guines TV ( Guines )
- Tele Mar( Santa Cruz del Norte )
- Tele Bandera( Cardenas )
- Centro Norte TV (Caibarién)
- Sagua Visión (Sagua la Grande)
- Ciego de Avila TV (Ciego de Ávila)
- Morón TV (Morón)
- Nuevavisión (Nuevitas)
- Gibaravisión (Gibara)
- Moa TV (Moa)
- Canal 32 (Bayamo)
- Golfovisión ( Manzanillo )
- Portadavisión ( Niquero)
- Palma TV ( Palma Soriano)
- Primadavisión( Baracoa)

== Listings ==
Daily listings appear in the newspaper Granma.

Weekly listings appear on the website of Juventud Rebelde.

Recently, using channels in Telegram, the national channels promote their listings every day.

== See also ==
- Media of Cuba
- List of newspapers in Cuba
- Telecommunications in Cuba
- Internet in Cuba
- Cinema of Cuba
- Censorship in Cuba

== Bibliography ==
- Michael Salwen (1994). Radio and Television in Cuba: The Pre-Castro Era. Iowa State University Press. ISBN 0813821800.
- Yeidy M. Rivero (2007). "Broadcasting Modernity: Cuban Television 1950-1953". Cinema Journal. 46 (3): 3–23. doi:10.1353/cj.2007.0028. S2CID 144295478.
- Armando López (November 2, 2013), "La televisión en Cuba: comienzo y final de la diversión", El Nuevo Herald (in Spanish), USA
- Yeidy M. Rivero (2015). Broadcasting Modernity: Cuban Commercial Television, 1950-1960. Duke University Press. ISBN 978-0-8223-7568-5.
