= Televisión del Caribe =

Defunct Cuban television station

Televisión del Caribe (channel 11, later channel 10) was a Cuban television channel founded by Storer Broadcasting, an American media company, and owned by Radio Televisión del Caribe. Throughout its period on air, it experienced several chanes in name and ownership, until its closure in 1960.

== History ==
In 1953, Havana already had four television stations—Channel 2 (frequency later used by Tele Rebelde), Channel 4 (Unión Radio Televisión), Channel 6 (CMQ-TV, now Cubavisión) and Channel 7. Storer Broadcasting invested US$500,000 in the set-up of a fifth television station on channel 11, Televisión del Caribe. Work began in the summer of 1952 by ordering equipment and finding talent. Channel director Delfín Fernandez found negotiations difficult and tried financing a special program titled Welcome to Cuba aimed at 5,000 US expats living in the country, but was ultimately canceled due to its high costs. The station opened on 11 November 1953 with a line-up of films acquired on the cheap, mostly from the US Embassy. The station's callsign was CMTV and it was managed by Al Shropshire from Storer.

Once the station went on air, it encountered reception problems: most viewers could receive signals on VHF channels 2, 4 and 6 on Band I and channel 7 on Band III, but not channel 11 (on the same band). This led to TV repairmen assisting in fixing sets in order to receive its signal properly. Storer announced that it would sell Televisión del Caribe upon signing off on April 30, 1954, subsequently the station changed hands several times and resumed operations still as the minor player it was under Storer. That summer, Amadeo Barletta acquired the station and relaunched it on August 5 at the Ambar Motors Building he owned. As part of a government decision to reduce the amount of players, it was acquired by Telemundo, owners of channel 2, with channel 11 becoming its secondary station.

In 1955, Barletta leased its facilities to Carlos D'Mart and former Havana mayor Nicolás Castellano, and inaugurated itself for the third time (having previously done so under Storer and Barletta) on April 11 of that year. As with previous incarnations of the channel, it had inexpensive programs, such as "round tables" and programs in English. This phase did not last long, with the lease expiring in August and the station shut down again.

On December 1, 1956, Televisión del Caribe reverted operations back to Barletta and moved to channel 10; subsequently channel 12 was used by a new station, Telecolor, founded by Gaspar Pumarejo in 1958. Although the move to a new frequency led to a slight improvement in its reception, channel 10 was still facing the same problems as before. In late 1958, Barletta leased the station to US interests, with capital from the NBC television network. The station took on a new name, Televisión Habanera, and was operated by Reuben Moulds, who had his experience filming commercials prior to his management at the station. Programming included the broadcast of dubbed US movies and programming in English for the American community, as well as a special show featuring Jack Paar and his entire crew. The arrangement with NBC led to it airing titles such as Victory at Sea and The Life of Riley.

The station survived the Cuban Revolution, but was shut down in March 1960 when Barletta's assets were nationalized.
