= Radio Taíno =

Cuban radio station

Havana, Cuba; Cuba
- Broadcast area: Republic of Cuba
- Frequency: FM

Programming
- Language: Spanish

Ownership
- Owner: Cuban Institute of Information and Social Communication
- Sister stations: Radio Reloj; Radio Progreso; Radio Enciclopedia; Radio Rebelde

History
- First air date: November 3, 1985

Radio Taíno is a Cuban Spanish language radio station and is the tourism radio station of Cuba, broadcasts 24 hours a day from Radio Center Havana.

== History and details ==
The station was founded on November 3, 1985 and was popularly known as "Cuba's tourist station", with content aimed at foreign visitors who came to the country as tourists, diplomatic missions and businesses.

Already in the 1990s of the twentieth century, Radio Taíno's programming modernized its style and to guarantee a wider coverage they decided that the English language should be present.

On Radio Taino there is a considerable presence of Cuban music, although songs from the Latin American, Caribbean or Anglo-Saxon repertoire are also broadcast. And in the case of the locution, a colloquial, direct, soft cadence language is essential.

== Programming ==
Title	Host(s) / Cast	Topics	Debut
Éxitos y leyendas	Jorge Luis Sopo	Music	?
De Mañana	Alain Amador Pardo	Music and Interviews	1996
Hablando de Cuba	Obelia Blanco & Alden Knight	History and Culture	November 9, 1985
A Buena Hora	Ana María Domínguez Cruz	Music and Interviews	1994
S.O.S Planeta	Idalmis Velasco & Mauricio Lomonte	Science and History	1994
Con Acento Cubano	Yisell Fundora	Participation questions	?
Estar Contigo	?	Culture	?
Mirando al Sur	?	Music	?
Oasis de Domingo	Jorge Luis Sopo	Asian culture	1997
Acompáñame	Daniel Villasana	Culture and Society	July 10, 2011
Revista Taíno	Frank Abel Gómez	Participation questions and Music	2020
Quédate con Taíno	Anyer Martín Venegas	Music	2020
Conciencia	?	Science, technology and environment	?
De África	?	African Culture	?
Te traigo un ritmo	?	Music	?
Páginas inéditas	?	Music	?
Los inolvidables	?	Music	?
Aquí se Baila	?	Music	?
Mirando a las Estrellas	?	Music	?
Sabor a mi	?	Culinary	?
