= Telemundo (Cuban TV network) =

Defunct Cuban television station

Telemundo (channel 2) was a Cuban television channel owned by Amadeo Barletta. One of the most prolific television stations of 1950s Cuba, the station formed a twinstick with Televisión del Caribe in 1954. Ultimately, the station was expropriated in 1960 and was shut down, with the frequency later being handed over to state rule.

== History ==
Telemundo (Radio-Televisión El Mundo) was established following Barletta's sale of his shares on Unión Radio in order to associate himself with the El Mundo newspaper and to establish a new television station, which began broadcasts on February 18, 1953. It immediately negotiated with Philco to set up an eight-station network, said network went operational in 1956.

The station was based on the second and third floors of the Ambar (initial letters of Amadeo Barletta) Motors car dealership, Its programming schedule in its first six months was deemed "experimental". This caused Barletta to initiate an advertising war with CMQ. A twinstick between it and Televisión del Caribe was formed in 1954 to cut costs on the amount of players in the Cuban television market of the time.

In March 1955, Telemundo hired Lolita Berrio, Gaspar Pumarejo's sidekick on Unión Radio Televisión's Escuela de Televisión, to take part on a similar program on the station. After that, the network signed an agreement with Pumarejo to carry his program for five years, starting August 1, 1955. The deal was beneficial for Barletta, as it had more national coverage, but lacked programs. However, Pumarejo needed better facilities, as the ones Telemundo had lacked air conditioning.

In 1959, the station started airing programs in leased blocks from Otto Sirgo. The move came as soon as Gaspar Pumarejo left Cuba due to the Cuban Revolution, causing a ratings drop, and the network still needed programming. Barletta continued operating his stations until February 1960, when he was accused by Fidel Castro of tax evasion and was put up under house arrest. Barletta later went to the Italian Embassy where he moved to the Dominican Republic, and later Miami, where he could continue El Mundo in exile. Consequently the state took over channel 2 and renamed it as Televisión Revolución. The new station started broadcasting on October 1, 1960 (by the merger of Telemundo and Unión Radio TV) subsequently in 1979, the station was absorbed into ICRT's Tele Rebelde.
