= Tele Rebelde =

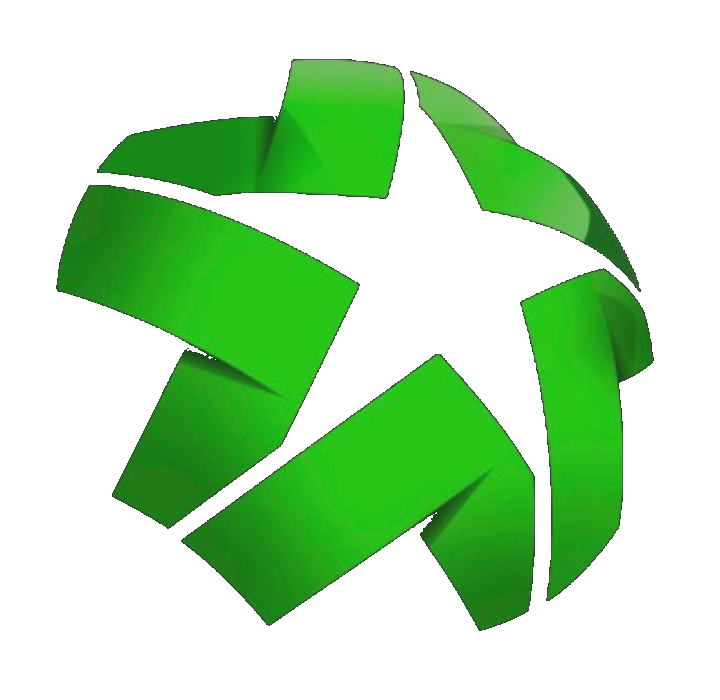
- Headquarters: Havana, Cuba

Programming
- Language: Spanish
- Picture format: 1080i HDTV (downscaled to 480p for the SDTV feed)

Ownership
- Owner: ICRT
- Sister channels: Cubavisión; Canal Educativo; Canal Educativo 2 Multivisión

History
- Launched: July 22, 1968; 58 years ago
- Replaced: Canal 2
- Former names: TV Cubana

Links
- Website: http://www.telerebelde.icrt.cu

Availability

Terrestrial
- Digital TV: Channel 2 SDTV, Channel HD3HDTV

Tele Rebelde is Cuba's second national television network, founded in 1968. Originally a generalist channel similar to Cubavisión, the channel became a specialized sports network after the creation of Multivisión. It broadcasts fifteen hours a day, starting from 9am.

== History ==
The Havana channel was founded as Telemundo canal 2 in 1953 and was nationalized in 1960 becoming ICR Canal 2. Tele Rebelde was officially launched on July 22, 1968, in the city of Santiago de Cuba. It broadcast its signal to the then Oriente province and aimed to reflect the region in which it was based. It broadcast a wide variety of programs for six hours a day from Monday through Saturday and on Sunday afternoons. In its first years, its idents featured "Here is Tele Rebelde" in like manner as its sister radio station, Radio Rebelde. In 1975, it became the first station to switch to NTSC color, followed by Channel 2 in Havana.

In 1979, Tele Rebelde from Santiago de Cuba and Channel 2 in Havana were merged into a unified brand, the new network retained most of the programming and the name of the Santiago de Cuba station while also opening a new studio facility. The Havana frequency, formerly used by Telemundo until March 1960, was used by Televisión Revolución, a state-run TV station that opened on October 1, 1960.

== Programming ==
The channel's programming is primarily sports, with the exception of the evening magazine, which is also transmitted by Cubavisión International, with the inclusion of domestic and foreign programs distributed by thematic blocks depending on the schedule. From Monday to Saturday, the channel begins with the news magazine Good Morning, Awakening All Cuba, and reports of world and national events, emphasizing culture and sport, with the rest of the morning programming block dedicated to sports and fitness. Aside from its local and international coverage of different sports such as football, cycling, motor sports among others in which the country takes part, its flagship sports coverages are on baseball, primarily on the Cuban baseball league system and is the official television partner of the Cuba national baseball team. One of its high rating broadcasts are those of the Cuban National Series season matches, from the opening day leading up to the playoffs and the national finals, as well as of the mid-year Super Series, and since 2014 is also the national broadcaster of the Caribbean Series.

The channel also broadcasts cultural programming, including those in the performing arts and Cuban cinema.

== Sports coverage ==
These sporting events are broadcast by Tele Rebelde and are produced by the ICRT for the channel.

Football

- Campeonato Nacional de Cuba
- La Liga
- Copa del Rey
- UEFA Champions League
- UEFA Europa League
- 2024 Copa América
- 2026 FIFA World Cup qualification (CONCACAF)
- 2026 FIFA World Cup qualification (CONMEBOL)
- 2026 FIFA World Cup qualification (UEFA)
- UEFA Super Cup
- Bundesliga
- DFB-Pokal
- Premier League
- FA Cup
- Serie A
- Coppa Italia
- Ligue 1
- Coupe de France
- Major League Soccer
  - including MLS All Star Game and MLS Cup Playoffs
- CONCACAF Champions League
- CONCACAF Gold Cup
- UEFA Euro
- FIFA World Cup

Baseball

- Cuban National Series - flagship broadcast
- Cuban Elite League
- Caribbean Series
- Major League Baseball
  - including All Star Game, postseason games and the World Series
- World Baseball Classic
- WBSC Premier12
- All WBSC Baseball World Cups (U-12, U-15, U-18, U-23)

Basketball

- National Basketball Association
- EuroLeague
- EuroCup
- Liga Superior de Baloncesto
- Liga de las Américas
- FIBA Americas Championship
- FIBA CaribeBasket
- FIBA CentroBasket

Multi-sport events

- 2024 Summer Olympics
- 2018 Central American and Caribbean Games
- 2023 Pan American Games
- 2026 Summer Youth Olympics

Other events

- National Football League
  - including playoffs and Super Bowl
- National Hockey League
- MotoGP
- Formula 1
- Dakar Rally
- NASCAR Cup Series
- IndyCar Series
- Italian Volleyball League
- Major cycling events:
  - Giro d'Italia
  - Tour de France
  - Vuelta a España
  - Paris–Tours
  - Volta a Catalunya
  - Tour of Belgium

== Programs ==
- Noticiero Nacional Deportivo
- Revista Buenos Días
- Beisbol de Siempre
- Bola Viva
- Confesiones de Grandes
- A Todo Motor
- Gol 360
- Súmate
- Vale 3
- Meridiano Deportivo
- Al duro y sin guante
- Glorias Deportivas
- A 3 tiempos
- Estocada al Tiempo
- Lente Deportivo
- Resumen Bundesliga
- Volvemos al Juego

== Criticism ==
=== Lack of financial means to carry international events ===
In May 2021, ICRT did not acquire the rights to air Euro 2020 and Copa América, due to financial constraints and the pandemic's situation in Cuba. The channel was criticized by Cuban netizens when it announced that it would not broadcast the 2022 UEFA Champions League final, with ICRT's stance being that they did not acquire the rights to the league.

=== Piracy ===
In February 2019, it was discovered that ICRT pirated signals to carry the UEFA Champions League. ICRT was using five satellites to carry sports feeds, but after that, it only used one satellite. Viewers had to rely on bootleg satellite dishes, illegal in Cuba, to watch matches.

=== Anti-Díaz Canel sign 2021 ===
In late May 2011, Tele Rebelde aired a baseball match live from West Palm Beach, whose world feed included a protest sign against the Cuban regime saying "DIAZ CANEL SINGAO", while another spectator held a photograph of opposition leader Luis Manuel Otero Alcántara. Netizens took to social media to talk about the issue.

=== Censorship of anti-war message ===
Shortly after the Russian invasion of Ukraine, La Liga inserted a "STOP INVASION" graphic into its world feed. The channel plastered the message, while leaving La Liga's symbol intact in the strap, with the channel's name. The Cuban government refuses to recognize the war as an invasion.

== See also ==
- Television in Cuba
