= Announcer =

Person who makes announcements in an audio medium or a physical location

An announcer is a voice artist who relays information to the audience on a broadcast media programme or live event.

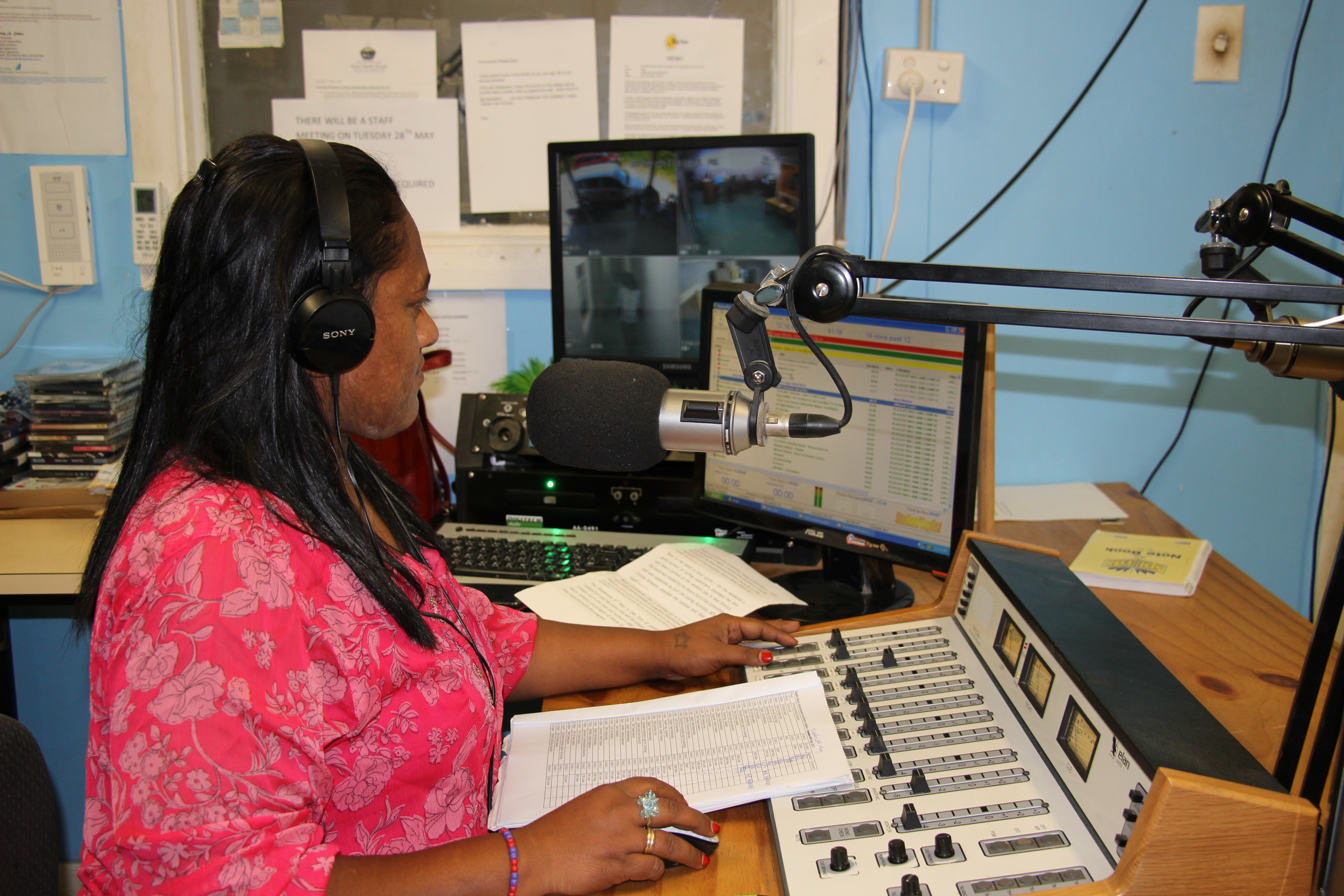
The announcer Maryposa Deidenang hosts a show at a Nauruan radio station.

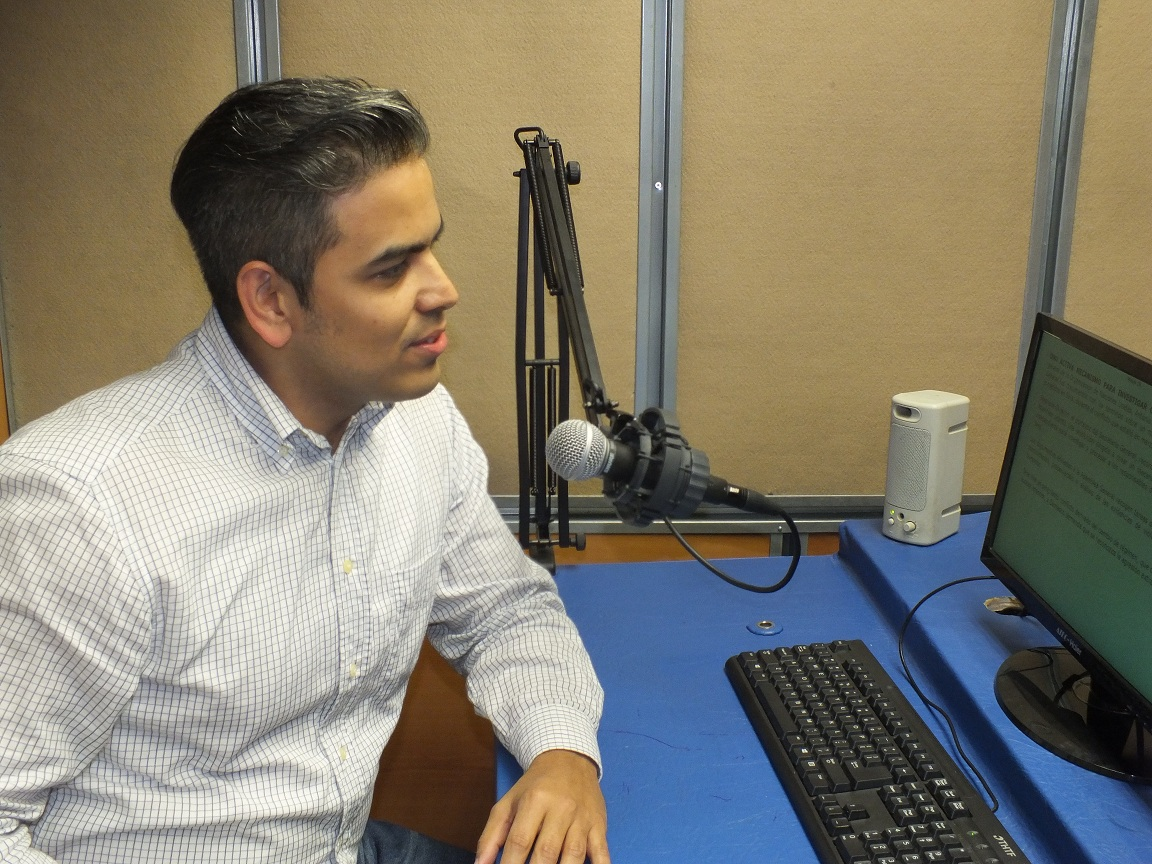
The announcer Mauricio Lomonte at the news broadcasting station Radio Reloj.

== Television and other media ==
Some announcers work in television production, radio or filmmaking, usually providing narrations, news updates, station identification, or an introduction of a product in television commercials or a guest on a talk show. Music television announcers were also called video jockeys (VJ).

Announcers are often voice actors who read prepared scripts, but in some cases, they have to ad-lib commentary on the air when presenting news, sports, weather, time, and television commercials. Occasionally, announcers are also involved in writing the screenplay or scripts when one is required. Sometimes announcers also interview guests and moderate panels or discussions. Some provide commentary for the audience during sporting events (known as sports announcers), parades, and other events.

Announcers perform a variety of tasks including presenting news, sports, weather, traffic, and music. Other duties include interviewing guests, making public appearances at promotional events, announcing station programming information. Announcers are also sometimes responsible for operating studio equipment and producing/selling advertisements. Television and radio announcers generally have a bachelor's degree in communications, broadcasting, or journalism. Some announcers cross "fields" by working in multiple media, such as television, radio, and commercials. For example, Bob Eubanks was in radio then became a television game show host, occasionally doing both jobs at the same time, and Townsend Coleman III started in radio then became a free-lance voice-over announcer and went on to voice cartoons.

== Radio ==
=== The role of the announcer in radio stations on air ===
In some radio stations (mainly news), the announcers must have special skill, dexterity and agility when transmitting information.

An example of this is the news station Radio Reloj, where the pages of two voices must have between 15 and 16 lines written, and those of one voice, between 13 and 15. If the information meets that requirement and the announcer from the beginning reads at an appropriate pace, must conclude at the exact minute. However, it may happen that some minutes the editors leave them a little long. Faced with this situation, the speaker accelerates the pace of his reading, in order to finish the text on time. Sometimes when the news is short, the announcer completes it with the so-called queues, which are important ephemeris, curious facts, congratulations to personalities. It may also be the case that information has the lines, in correspondence with its format, but has several points and followed. This implies that the announcer pauses, and has to speed up the reading rhythm to finish on the exact minute. In fact Mauricio Lomonte, an announcer for this station, said:

It's hard work, because other than knowing the extent of this radio station, you have to talk for an entire hour, reading the news at first sight, without some preparation first, it takes a lot from the announcers, that's why it needs a lot of experience, focus and interpretation when being on air.

=== Others ===
Radio announcers are often known as disc jockeys (DJs). While some read from scripts, others completely ad-lib. These DJs' tasks consist of on-air interviewing, taking/responding to listener requests, running contests, and making remarks about various subjects like the weather, traffic, sports, and other news. Most radio announcers announce the artists and titles of songs, but don't necessarily choose what song airs on the radio. Many stations have a management teams who select the songs ahead of time. Today radio stations have DJs update the station's website with music, guest interviews, show schedules, and photos. Radio announcers are also known radio jockeys (RJ).

== Live events ==
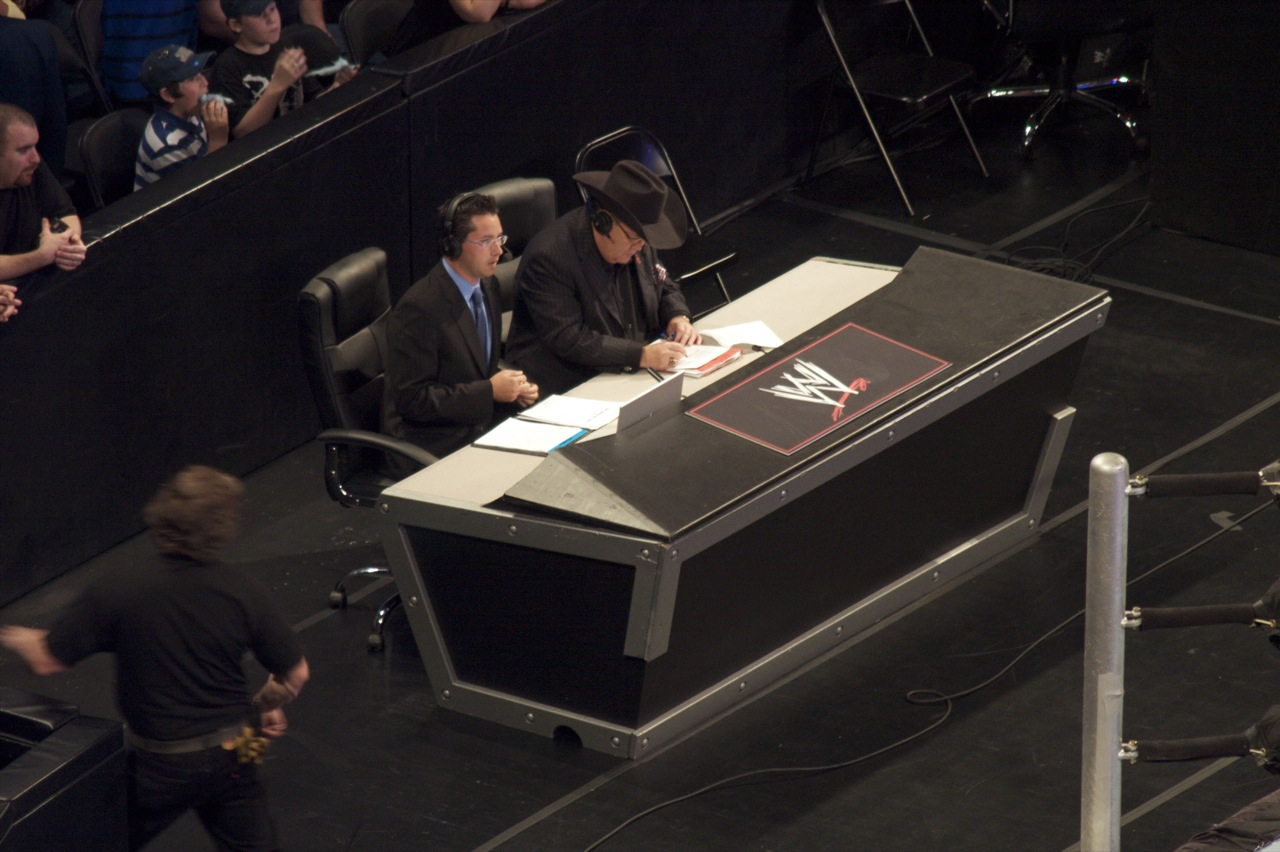
Jim Ross, World Wrestling Entertainment announcer

Public address (PA) announcers work in physical locations, including sporting venues. They will give the attendees information about performing acts, speakers, players, score (such as a goal or touchdown), infractions, or the results of the event.

Announcers may be specialized according to sport; for instance, a horse race announcer provides a rapid-fire second-by-second account of the race (as well as introducing the entries before the race), while a horse show announcer is the "voice of management" and helps keep the show moving, plays select music and makes announcements during the show. A baseball announcer may simply introduce the next batter or recap the previous half-inning. Public address announcers may be notable due to their longevity, or tenure with a popular team or venue. Some announcers, particularly in horse racing, may also be known for television or radio work.

== See also ==
- Announcer's test
- Continuity announcer
- Sportscaster
- News presenter
- List of American public address announcers
- List of Japanese announcers
