= Que suenen las palmas =

Single by Celia Cruz

from the album Azúcar Negra
- Language: Spanish
- Released: March 9, 1993
- Recorded: 1992–1993
- Genre: Salsa
- Length: 4:56
- Label: EMI
- Composer: Alfredo Brito
- Producers: Ralph Mercado (executive); Óscar Gómez (musical)

"Que suenen las palmas" (Let the clapping ring out) is a song by composer Alfredo Brito, performed by Celia Cruz and included in her album Azúcar Negra.

== Thematic ==
The song is about the cultural fusion between Cuban Salsa and Andalusian Flamenco.

The composer asks the Andalusian musician to play with him:

Come and clap your hands, I want my claves to be joined with your guitar...

He describes how his music is influenced by Andalusian culture:

Something wonderful began when your "salero" became mine, Sevilla and Cádiz were mixed with rivers of sugar cane and my music was stained with your best wine...

Expresses his desire to merge both cultures:

If I could, I would take La Giralda to Havana....

== OST of "Como un relámpago" ==
In 1996, "Que suenen las palmas" was included as part of the Original Soundtrack for the film "Cómo un relámpago", directed by Miguel Hermoso and starring Assumpta Serna, Eloy Azorín and Santiago Ramos (Goya Award to the Best Actor for his performance).
