= 530 AM =

AM radio frequency

530 AM is a regional broadcast frequency on AM radio. It is the lowest frequency of the AM band in the United States. The following radio stations broadcast on AM frequency 530 kHz:

== Argentina ==
- Somos Radio in Buenos Aires

== Canada ==
Broadcasting status copied from Wikipedia articles on specific stations.

- CHLO in Brampton (Greater Toronto Area), Ontario, transmitter located at 43.588179°N 79.884006°W
- CIRS in Sault Ste. Marie, Ontario, off-air since 2010.
- CKML in Chalk River, Ontario, license not renewed in 2012.
- CFHS in Fort Frances, Ontario, broadcasting status unknown.

== Cuba ==
These stations can be heard in large parts of the southeastern U.S. at night, interfering with each other.

- Radio Enciclopedia, CMBR, La Habana
- Radio Rebelde (call signs unknown) in Isla de Juventud and Guantánamo

== Falkland Islands ==
- Falklands Radio

== United States ==
All U.S.-based radio stations on 530 operate as travelers' information stations. A detailed list of all currently licensed stations can be queried at the FCC Website.

Note: In large parts of North America, the morse code LYQ (.-.. -.-- --.-) can be heard on this frequency. It originates from a non-directional beacon in Manchester, Tennessee, on 529 kHz.
