= Alfredo Brito =

Cuban musician (born 1941)

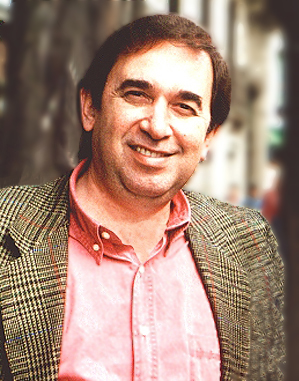
- Alfredo Brito in Madrid
- Born: Alfredo Valdés-Brito Gamba; November 9, 1941 (age 84); Havana, Cuba
- Occupations: Composer; Arranger; Singer
- Known for: Composing; Singing
- Notable work: Que suenen las palmas; Esta noche te voy a amar; Matías Pérez; Tema para una noche de bodas; Canción para la que tanto amé; Poco a poco mi compay; El tiempo feliz; El 4-5-6 (co-author with Julio Brito Gamba); Lisa (The World of David the Gnome); Amigo Klaus (Wisdom of the Gnomes)
- Spouse: Mercy Díaz Suárez
- Children: Julio Brito Ortíz; Alvan Brito
- Parent(s): Julio Brito Ibáñez; Antonia Gamba Cabrera
- Musical career
- Origin: Havana, Cuba
- Genres: Pop; Fusion; Singer-songwriter; Cuban music
- Instruments: Drums; Piano; Voice
- Works: See the Discography section of this article.
- Years active: 1957 to date.
- Labels: EGREM; Sony Music; Ariola; Polydor; Rodven Records; Emi-Odeon; PolyGram
- Formerly of: Los Brito

Notes
- Related artists: Celia Cruz; Garibaldi; Maggie Carles; Sylvia Pantoja; Azuquita; Los 3 Sudamericanos; Salsa Kids; Café Moreno; Alfredo Brito Ibáñez; Julio Brito; Alvan Brito

Alfredo Brito is a Cuban musician and singer, member of a family of artists of recognized prestige in the musical field. Founder and director in 1967 of the vocal quartet "Los Brito".

== Biography ==
Alfredo Brito (Alfredo Valdés-Brito Gamba) was born in Havana, Cuba, on November 9, 1941. He is the son of Antonia Gamba Cabrera and the well-known Cuban composer Julio Brito (Julio Valdés-Brito Ibáñez), author of El amor de mi bohío, Mira que eres linda, Cuando te acuerdes de mí, among many other well-known songs.

== Early years ==
From a very early age, following in the footsteps of his father and brother Julio, he became interested in learning musical techniques, learning theory and sol-fa with the former and drums with the latter.

He took his first professional steps at the age of 16 as a drummer in Eddy Gaytán's band at the club/restaurant La Rue 19, an elegant venue located on 19th Street in the Vedado neighborhood.

From there he became part of the orchestra that accompanied the musical show at the Hotel Sevilla directed by maestro Pomares.

Later he joined his father's orchestra as a percussionist at the Parisien Club of the Hotel Nacional.

Later the Chilean accordionist Larry Godoy proposes him to join his group to perform at the Doble o Nada lounge of the Hotel Riviera, and hires him as a singer as well as a drummer, which he had been interested in for some time, so he decides to accept the offer and becomes part of the new group.

At the end of the Riviera's contract, he returns to the Parisien Club of the Hotel Nacional, this time with Yoyo Casteleiro's orchestra, replacing Walfredo de los Reyes on drums and singing with Kiko Rodríguez.

While performing there, he studied harmony and counterpoint with professor Enrique Belver, piano with the outstanding concert pianist Rosario Franco and singing with soprano Margarita Horruitiner. He begins to make his first orchestrations, which are interpreted by the same orchestra of the hotel and also to write songs. It is then when the singer Leonora Rego records his song "Desde la eternidad de un beso" on EGREM records.

At the same time, he came up with the idea of forming a vocal quartet, for which he first counted on his brother Julio, who immediately joined the group, and they both set about the task of finding the other two members. They begin to shape the repertoire and Alfredo starts to create the vocal and instrumental parts for when the two remaining voices appear. The first to join the future group is Pedro Sánchez, “El Nene” as his friends call him, later Mercy Díaz Suárez -whom he will marry in 1968– joins the quartet.

== Second stage ==
In 1967 Los Brito made their debut, but suddenly and unexpectedly Pedro Sánchez died a year after the group's debut, and was replaced by Abelardo Cordero.

The quartet's first performance was on August 8 of that same year on Música y Estrellas, the most popular musical program on Cuban television at the time, directed by Manolo Rifat and hosted by Eva Rodríguez. That night they performed a song by Alfredo entitled "Matías Pérez", which was an immediate hit.

Since its inception and during its 15 years of existence, Cuarteto Los Brito always enjoyed the public's favor and topped the charts, performing on the best radio and television programs.

Los Brito's repertoire consisted almost entirely of songs by Alfredo and his brother Julio, and some of them were written by both of them, such as "El Banquito", or "El 4-5-6".

In 1970, the Cuban government conducted a poll to select the artists who would represent Cuba at the Varadero International Festival, and Los Brito were chosen by popular vote.

When the quartet was dissolved due to the absence of Julio and Abelardo, Alfredo and Mercy created the duo of the same name, making popular Brito songs such as "Mariela", "Un hasta luego", "Tiernamente, para siempre" and others.

As musical director of both groups, Alfredo Brito was responsible for all vocal and orchestral arrangements for both groups.

Well-known artists such as Celia Cruz, Garibaldi, Maggie Carlés and Luis Nodal, Salsa Kids, Ojedita, Sylvia Pantoja, Voces Latinas, Azuquita or Los 3 Sudamericanos, among others, have recorded his songs and orchestrations.

== Discography ==
Songs by Alfredo Brito (Recordings):

- Si te nace una flor, Cuarteto Los Brito (Discos EGREM)
- Que suenen las palmas, Celia Cruz (Emi-Odeon)
- Esta noche te voy a amar, Garibaldi (Emi-Odeon)
- Si pudiera, Garibaldi, (Emi-Odeon)
- Baila Apretao, Garibaldi (Emi-Odeon)
- Poco a poco mi compay, Cuarteto Los Brito (Discos EGREM)
- Tiene peligro, Salsa Kids (PolyGram)
- El tiempo feliz, Cuarteto Los Brito (Discos EGREM)
- Dale Miguel, Azuquita (PolyGram)
- Dime que sientes cuando hablas de mí, Cuarteto Los Brito (Discos EGREM)
- Ni mucho ni poco, Los 3 Sudamericanos (Divucsa)
- Tema para una noche de bodas, Cuarteto Los Brito (Discos EGREM)
- Pa'lante, Sylvia Pantoja (Bat Discos)
- Cuando llegó a mi casa, Cuarteto Los Brito (Discos EGREM)
- Volaré la oficina, Caña (Emi-Odeon)
- Quiéreme un poquito, Cuarteto Los Brito (Discos EGREM)
- Fuimos, Maggie Carlés (Rodven Records)
- Un viaje sin retorno ni partida, Cuarteto Los Brito (Discos EGREM)
- Yo quiero volver, Maggie Carlés (Forever Music Inc.)
- Ellos, Cuarteto Los Brito (Discos EGREM)
- Echa pa'lante, Caña (Emi-Odeon)
- Vas a acordarte de mi, Cuarteto Los Brito (Discos EGREM)
- Desde la eternidad de un beso, Leonora Rega (Discos EGREM)
- Canción para la que tanto amé, Cuarteto Los Brito (Discos EGREM)
- Amalia Valiente, Caña (Emi-Odeon)
- El 4 5 6, Cuarteto Los Brito (Discos EGREM)
- Cintas de colores, Café Moreno (Rodven Discos)
- El tiempo feliz, Cuarteto Los Brito (Discos EGREM)
- Con un sueño entre las manos, Cuarteto Los Brito (Discos EGREM)
- Así quiéreme, Cuarteto Los Brito (Discos EGREM)

== Music for film and TV ==
- Como un relámpago (Original soundtrack. Goya Award for Best Actor for Santiago Ramos).
- The World of David the Gnome (song: Lisa).
- Wisdom of the Gnomes) (song: Amigo Klaus).
- Inquilinos (All the music for the series of Canal Nou (Canal 9, Valencia). Co-authored with his son Alvan Brito).

== Bibliography ==
- Orovio, Helio (1981). Diccionario de la música cubana: biográfico y técnico (in Spanish). Editorial Letras Cubanas. ISBN 9591000480.
- Díaz Ayala, Cristóbal (1981). Música Cubana (Del Areyto a la Nueva Trova) (in Spanish). Editorial Cubanacan. ISBN 0897297032.
- Pages, Eduardo (1969-04-11). "Cuatro voces en busca el éxito" [Four voices in search of success] (PDF). Bohemia (in Spanish). p. 57.
- Quiroga, Orlando (1970-06-12). "Busque a "Los Brito" para que le canten un cuento" [Four voices in search of success] (PDF). Bohemia (in Spanish). p. 97.
- Paz Alomar, Héctor E. (2021-11-08). "Julio Brito, cantor melódico de Cuba" [Julio Brito, melodic singer of Cuba]. Periódico Invasor (in Spanish). Ciego de Ávila, Cuba.
