= 530 (disambiguation) =

530 may refer to:

- 530, a number in the 500s range
- AD 530 (DXXX), a year in the Common Era
- 530 BC, a year Before the Common Era
- 530 AM, an AM radio frequency
- Five Thirty, an English rock band
- "530", a song by Kanye West from Vultures 2 and Donda 2
