= Telecolor =

Defunct Cuban television station

Telecolor was a Cuban television channel founded by Gaspar Pumarejo (former owner of Unión Radio Televisión) and owned by president Fulgencio Batista. Touted as the world's first television station to broadcast a full-color line-up, it started operating in 1958. Following the nationalization of all television stations in Cuba in 1959, the station switched to a black and white operation before shutting down in 1960.

== History ==
Pumarejo obtained a license in 1956 to operate on channel 12 in Havana, subsequently raising US$1 million to build what was going to be the first all-color television station in the entire world. At the time, television stations in the United States, where color television was already a reality for a few years, only had a limited number of color programs. During the setup, he traveled to New York, having talks with RCA engineer David Sarnoff.

The channel started airing test patterns in December 1957 and began broadcasting at 6am on 19 March 1958, from its facilities at the Havana Hilton and, as its name implied, it was the first in Cuba to broadcast in color (using the NTSC standard), becoming the second country in the world to have a regular color service (after the United States). At the time, Cuba only had 509 color television sets.

Even with his intentions of making it the first full-color television station in the world, its programming was perceived as being amateurish, with constant problems in sound and transmission; however, Telecolor received praise for its news and current affairs programs, as well as feature reports produced by its foreign correspondents in Miami, Madrid, New York and Mexico City.

At the time of the Cuban Revolution, Pumarejo was in the United States buying equipment for Telecolor. Upon returning, a series of rumors began circulating about his close connections to the Fulgencio Batista regime (Batista had just fled Cuba). A labor leader appeared on the station and criticized Pumarejo for the spreading of rumors; Pumarejo denied any collusion with Batista. In order to prevent criticism of the government, in late February 1959, Telecolor reduced its news operation and dismissed fifteen of its staff working for it, much to the anger of the Cuban Newspaper Guild. In early March, Pumarejo fled Cuba, and his companies (Telecolor, Escuela de Televisión, Hogar Club) were confiscated by the state. Subsequently, the Cuban government viewed color television as "an extravagance" and converted the station to a black and white operation.

The government named Gabriel Casanova Salum Nasser as its interventor, keeping its entertainment output, but also including programs against Pumarejo. Several staff at the station were angered at the decision; Casanova eventually fired most staff and implemented staff aligned to the communist regime. On 25 March 1960, the station was nationalized.

The Cuban Institute of Radio and Television later used Telecolor's equipment, in addition to some parts from the Soviet Union. It wasn't until the late 80s that the conversion to color TV was properly finished in Cuba.
