= Radio Ciudad de La Habana =

- Havana; Cuba
- Frequency: See #Frequencies
- Branding: CMBE Radio Ciudad de La Habana

Programming
- Language: Spanish
- Format: Various

Ownership
- Owner: Cuban Institute of Information and Social Communication

History
- First air date: 1978
- Call sign meaning: CMBE

Links
- Website: radiociudadhabana.icrt.cu

Radio Ciudad de La Habana (English: Radio City from Havana), call sign CMBE, is a regional music radio station in Cuba. It is heard on 820 kHz AM and 94.7 MHz FM in Havana and the region. It is operated by the Institute of Information and Social Communication (IICS).

== History ==
The Radio Ciudad de La Habana was created on July 26, 1978, within the framework of the XI World Festival of Youth and Students, held in Havana. It began broadcasting on Calle J and 15, in Vedado, with special 24-hour programming until the aforementioned youth event concluded on August 5. On the occasion of the inauguration of the station, Fidel Castro said: "How great, a radio for young people!".

In 1979, the concept of the station was changed and a reorganization of radio broadcasting in the capital took place. In 1980, it assumed a varied programming as the capital's headquarters, from the studios on the 5th floor of building N, where it is currently located. The station is recognized for its commitment to alternative and contemporary Cuban culture. During the 1980s, it became a vital platform for the Asociación Hermanos Saíz (AHS), an organization for young Cuban artists and writers. This collaboration allowed for the introduction of experimental radio styles and a focus on genres that were often underrepresented on national radio, such as rock, alternative pop, and electronic music.

The station has traditionally stood out for broadcasting the work of the country's cultural avant-garde. In the 1980s, it gave a very important space to the incorporation of young members of the Asociación Hermanos Saíz (AHS), which set standards in the style of the plant's productions. Many of the programs that were created at that time survive today.

== Frequencies ==
Location	Call sign	Power [kW]	AM Frequency [kHz]	FM frequency [MHz]
La Habana	CMBE		820	94.7

== Sources ==
- CMBE Radio Ciudad de La Habana in Ecured.
