= Televisión Serrana =

- Granma Province; Cuba
- City: Buey Arriba

Programming
- Language: Spanish

Ownership
- Owner: Daniel Diez Castillo

History
- Founded: 1993

Technical information
- Licensing authority: ETECSA

Televisión Serrana (TVS), is a community-based television and video collective operating in Sierra Maestra in Cuba. TVS was founded by Daniel Diez Castillo in 1993 and is located in the small town of San Pablo de Yao, in the Buey Arriba territory. This small community inhabits 32,000 people and most are coffee growers and/or producers. The focus of TVS is to acknowledge and give voice to the farmers in the mountain ranges. TVS is preserving the culture of this small community and “connecting them to the broader cultural life of Cuba

TVS promotes awareness of the lives of those living in the Sierra Maestra through the form of art. TVS uses art to speak about the community's needs, beliefs, identity and to find “solutions to problems” in the region. TVS received national recognition on January 15, 1993 when institutions came together to sponsor and support TVS. UNESCO provided additional funding and support. The Cuban government supplied staff and training for employers and volunteers through the ICRT.

== Mission ==
Televisión Serrana was founded to "rescue the culture of campesino communities" and to foster communication between communities, particularly those in the mountainous region of the Sierra Maestra. Through the exchange of information, TVS hopes to identify solutions to common problems between these communities. Furthermore, TVS aims to affirm the identity of the people of the Sierra Maestra during a time of increased globalism.

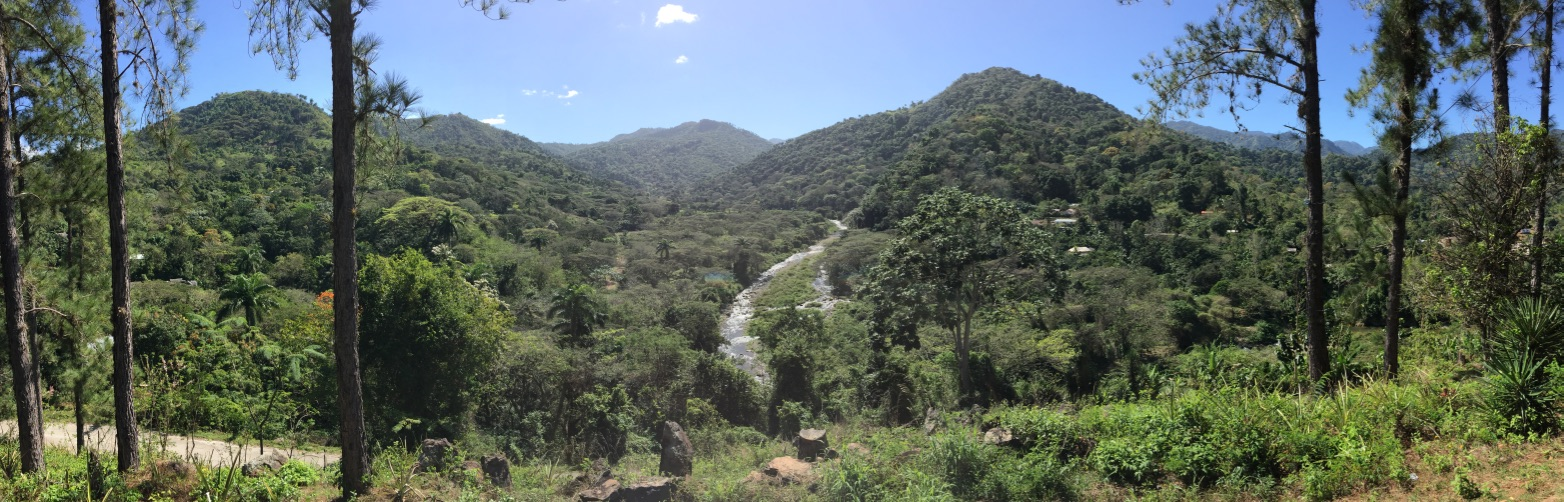
The Sierra Maestra as seen from Televisión Serrana .

== History ==
The project of TV Serrana began in 1993 by Daniel Diez Castillo. Castillo was a television producer in Havana, Cuba from The Cuban National Broadcasting Channel (ICRT). When Castillo left Havana, Cuba was in the “Periodo Especial” or Special Period. This was the economic crisis that followed after the fall of the Soviet Union. Castillo went east towards the region of the Sierra Maestra. The Sierra Maestra is known for its amazing mountains and the men who came across it. Fidel Castro, Che Guevara and many other rebels organized themselves to fight against Fulgencio Batista. Due to the mountainous terrain, the Sierra Maestra became isolated from other parts of Cuba. Before Castillo came along, the rest of Cuba portrayed Sierra Maestra as the "producers of staples; nothing was said about their dreams, their conflicts, their culture" . Daniel Diez Castillo then wanted to film the real Sierra Maestra, his goal was to “make a collective form of cinema, to produce movies and documentaries narrating the history and identity of people living that area, to create a form of partaken communication far from the capital” . TV Serrana was first funded by UNESCO, but after time they were able to self-fund its own programs.

== Tools and Main Features of Television Serrana ==
Tools used for Television Serrana are simple, it includes: "VHS, Super VHS and Beta nonprofessional cameras and editing equipment". The crew of TVS consists of “three cameramen, three directors, two editors, two producers, two sound assistants and three drivers who also set up the lighting when needed. One main feature used in TVS are video letters. A video letter is a reportage that captures the people of Sierra Maestra’s experiences, lives and dreams through their own perspective. Video letters are not edited by the media, but they show the true reality and struggles of the people. Video letters are also important because they are seen by others and are used for responding. They create communication between boundaries and is a great factor in Television Serrana.

== Services Provided ==
The program aims to promote self-sustaining activities, TV Serrana provides programs and opportunities to the people living within the villages. A majority of the training workshops were given through El Centro de Estudios para la Comunicación Comunitaria (CECC), created in 1996. TV Serrana along with the help of supporting institutions provides training and services through seminars that help locals with communication and community building skills through the use of media. These programs offer lessons to villagers "willing to use video in their communities as a tool for participatory development and democratic communication". Other services accessible through TVS is the ability to transfer and copy video-cassettes from and to Beta and S-VHS which allow people within the communities to share their stories.

== Constraints ==
Television Serrana has been a growing success, but there were difficulties in the beginning. One of the problems of TVS was the lack of experience many of the crew members had. Most had to take training sessions on how to work media products and running programs within the community. As mentioned before, the trainees had to learn how to do video letters and how to transfer and copy video-cassettes to and from Beta. The greatest of constraints for the project was gaining the trust and confidence needed by the local communities. Many of the villagers were skeptical of the programs intentions, which created difficulties to gain the support from locals. The people of Sierra Maestra felt the newcomers were intruding onto their land, interrupting their daily lives and thought the intentions of the crew were to give the locals a bad image. The crew had to show the people that they came with positive objectives and wanted to help the communities.
