= Arnie Coro =

Cuban radio host (1942–2023)

Arnaldo Coro Antích (2 July 1942 – 8 January 2023) was a Cuban radio host, academic and popular amateur radio operator. He was a cofounder of Radio Havana and hosted the English language Radio Habana show DXers Unlimited which broadcasts twice a week. He was also a professor of broadcasting at the University of Havana.

His amateur radio call sign was CO2KK. In Cuba, Coro is considered "the guru of ham radio operators" and is credited with increasing interest in Cuban amateur radio operation and garnered many fans in the United States. Due to the difficulty in acquiring radio equipment, Coro assembled his radio equipment from pieces of old radios, Soviet-era television sets and fax machines.

Coro became interested in long-distance transmission as a child when his father bought a television set, after which he got into TV DX. While on a 48-hour leave from his military duties, he witnessed a Douglas B-26 Invader finishing a strafing run on an airport near his home, alerting him to the start of the Bay of Pigs Invasion. Coro was also involved in the capturing of prisoners, some of whom were former schoolmates, in the Zapata Swamp.

Coro died on 8 January 2023, at the age of 80.

== Sources ==
- Eaton, Tracey (23 February 2002). "Cuban ham radio operator makes friends around world (free article preview)". Dallas Morning News.
- "Cuba Conversations - Arnaldo Coro Antich". Democracy Now!. 12 January 1998. Archived from the original on 11 April 2007. Audio of Arnaldo Coro Antich interview (RealPlayer)
- Sweeney, John (12 September 2006). "Amateur Radio in Cuba". WorldRadio. Archived from the original on 17 September 2014.
- Coro Antich, Arnaldo (17 April 2008). "Radio Havana Cuba Interview".
