= Azúcar Negra =

Studio album by Celia Cruz
- Released: March 9, 1993
- Recorded: 1992–1993
- Genre: Latin pop
- Length: 41:51
- Label: RMM
- Producers: Sergio George; Tito Nieves; Oscar Gomez; Papo Pepin; Rubin Rodriguez

Celia Cruz chronology
Verdadera Historia (1992)	Azúcar Negra (1993)	Boleros Polydor (1993)

Azúcar Negra (English: "Black Sugar") is a studio album by the Cuban salsa singer Celia Cruz. It was nominated for a Grammy Award for Best Tropical Latin Album, Vocal or Instrumental in 1994. It was her first album to go gold in Spain for selling 50,000 copies and sold over 80,000 units total.

== Critical reception ==
Professional ratings
Review scores
Source	Rating
AllMusic	3/5 stars
Chicago Tribune	4/4 stars
The Encyclopedia of Popular Music	4/5 stars
Los Angeles Times	3/4 stars

The Chicago Tribune called the album "a truly sweet and artfully balanced mix of many worlds: a smart international pan-Latin style that draws on classic salsa, new Latin pop." The Los Angeles Times noted that "though representative of Cruz's well-known style, it allows room for a more pop-oriented presence."

== Track listing ==
No.	Title	Lyrics	Length
1.	"Azúcar Negra"	Mario Díaz	2:57
2.	"Amores De Un Día"	Johnny Ortiz	3:48
3.	"Sazón"	Emilio Estefan, Gloria Estefan	4:47
4.	"Pasaporte Latinoamericano"	Ángel "Cucco" Peña, Guadalupe García	5:04
5.	"De La Habana Hasta Aquí"	Emilio Aragón	3:34
6.	"Ochún Con Changó"	Titti Sotto	3:59
7.	"Bolero, Bolero"	Cheni Navarro	3:52
8.	"Que Suenen Las Palmas"	Alfredo Brito	4:57
9.	"Te Busco"	Víctor Víctor	4:06
10.	"Cruz De Navajas"	José María Cano	4:57

== Personnel ==
- Composer - Alfredo Brito
- Assistant Engineer - Alfredo Delafuente
- Trombone - Alfredo Marquez
- Engineer - Allan Leschhorn
- Arranger, Keyboards, Piano, Programming - Carlos Goméz
- Engineer - Carlos Santos
- Vocals - Celia Cruz
- Engineer - Charles Dye
- Composer - Cheni Navarro
- Backing Vocals - Cheo Quiñones
- Engineer - Chris Dibble
- Composer - Cucco Peña
- Trombone - Dana Teboe
- Saxophone - Ed Calle
- Percussion - Eddie Torres
- Make-Up - Eddie Valentine
- Art Direction - Elena C. Martínez
- Composer - Emilio Aragón
- Arranger, Composer - Emilio Estefan, Jr.
- Engineer - Eric Schilling
- Engineer - Eric Taveras
- Photography - Felix Lam
- Composer, Backing Vocals - Gloria Estefan
- Composer - Guadalupe "Lupillo" García
- Assistant Engineer - Gundemard Arrancapescueso
- Percussion - Henry Diaz
- Producer, Remixing, Trombone, Trumpet - Héctor "Bomberito" Zarzuela
- Arranger, Keyboards, Piano, Producer, Programming - Javier Losada
- Coros, Producer Remixing, Backing Vocals - Joe King
- Assistant Engineer - John Guasamandraca
- Composer - Johnny Ortiz
- Backing Vocals - Jon Secada
- Engineer - Jorge Garcia
- Trumpet - Jose Medrano
- Backing Vocals - Jose Moranto
- Composer - José María Cano
- Backing Vocals - Juan Canovas
- Guitar - Juanito Márquez
- Engineer - Kurt Upper
- Trumpet - Luis Aquino
- Backing Vocals - Maisa Hens
- Arranger - Manuel Tejada
- Composer - Mario Diaz
- Backing Vocals - María Lar
- Backing Vocals - Miguel Martin
- Bass, Director, Musical Director, Percussion, Producer, Backing Vocals - Oscar Gomez
- Assistant Engineer - Pancho Carrancho
- Percussion, Producer, Remixing - Papo Pepin
- Engineer - Patrice Wilkinson Levinsohn
- Executive Producer - Ralph Mercado
- Arranger, Keyboards, Multi Instruments, Piano, Producer, Programming, Trumpet - Randy Barlow
- Guest Artist, Guitar - Rene Toldeo
- Bass, Producer, Remixing - Reuben Rodriguez
- Bass - Rubén Rodríguez
- Assistant Engineer - Ruy Garcia
- Cover Photo, Photography - Sally Hershberger
- Percussion - Sammy Pagan
- Assistant Engineer, Engineer - Scott Perry
- Assistant Engineer - Sean Chambers
- Assistant Engineer - Sebastián Krys
- Coros, Keyboards, Piano, Producer, Remixing, Backing Vocals - Sergio George
- Assistant Engineer - Sergio Lopez
- Arranger, Keyboards, Piano, Producer, Programming, Backing Vocals - Steve Roitstein
- Hair Stylist - Teddy Antolin
- Trombone - Teddy Mulet
- Trombone - Tedoy Mullet
- Flute, Saxophone - Tito Duarte
- Coros, Producer, Remixing, Backing Vocals - Tito Nieves
- Composer - Titti Sotto
- Trumpet - Tony Concepcion
- Composer - Victor Victor

== Chart positions ==
Chart (1993)	Peak position
Latin Albums (Billboard)	37
Tropical/Salsa Albums (Billboard)	6
