= Radio Havana Cuba =

International broadcasting station of Cuba

- Type: International broadcasting
- Country: Cuba

Ownership
- Owner: Government of Cuba
- Key people: Luis López López (General Director); Pedro Otero Cabañas (Chief Editor); Arnie Coro (co-founder and host)

History
- Launch date: 1 May 1961

Coverage
- Availability: International

Links
- Webcast: Escúchanos en VIVO stream (MP3, 64kbps)
- Website: radiohc.cu

Radio Havana Cuba (Spanish: Radio Habana Cuba, RHC) is the official government-run international broadcasting station of Cuba. It can be heard in many parts of the world, including the United States, on shortwave frequencies. Radio Havana Cuba, along with Radio Rebelde, Cubavision Television, and other Cuban radio and television, broadcasts to North, Central and South America via free-to-air programming from the Hispasat 30W-6 satellite over the Atlantic Ocean and worldwide via Internet streaming.

== Early history (1960s–1980s) ==
Although RHC was officially inaugurated in May 1961, the idea of an international Cuban radio station was born in the Sierra Maestra mountains during the final stage of the fight against Fulgencio Batista. After the creation of Radio Rebelde by Ernesto 'Che' Guevara in February 1958, the leadership of the guerrilla movement began to analyze the possibility of creating a radio station after achieving final victory. This station would be able to communicate news about the Cuban Revolution to countries around the world.

The station unofficially began broadcasting during the Bay of Pigs Invasion in order to spread news of the attack, and the Cuban defence against it, internationally. The existence of the as-of-yet unnamed station was announced by Fidel Castro in a speech the next day on 17 April 1961, celebrating the invasion's defeat, with Castro announcing that Cuba had already in operation a shortwave radio station, able to carry the truth about Cuba beyond its borders. The station was officially launched a few days later on 1 May 1961, with its name proclaimed as Radio Havana Cuba, during a mass rally at Plaza de la Revolución in Havana held to celebrate Cuba's victory over the US-sponsored invasion attempt.

During the Cold War, RHC relayed propaganda broadcasts from North Vietnam and North Korea, and the USSR, as well as its original programming. The North Vietnamese programming from the Voice of Vietnam was received by teleprinter and read by Radio Havana Cuba announcers. In the 1960s, Radio Havana Cuba broadcast Radio Free Dixie aimed at African-Americans struggling against segregation and Jim Crow in the southern United States.

At times in the 1980s, in order to protest the Reagan administration's Cuba policy and its instigation of the anti-Castro Radio Martí program from the Voice of America, Radio Havana Cuba broadcast briefly on mediumwave frequencies at a greatly boosted power allowing the station to be heard on American AM radios and overwhelming local American AM stations broadcasting on that frequency, including clear channel station WHO in Des Moines, Iowa on 1040 kHz. RHC no longer transmits on mediumwave, even though Radio Martí still transmits from the United States to Cuba on 1180 kHz.

== Current broadcasting ==
Located on Havana's Avenida Infanta, the offices of Radio Havana Cuba share a facility with two other renowned national stations that have contributed greatly to the history of Cuban radio broadcasting: Radio Progreso and CMBF, Radio Musical Nacional. Currently, RHC broadcasts in nine languages: Spanish, English, French, Portuguese, Arabic, Quechua, Guarani, Creole and Esperanto, 24 hours a day, with a varied programming that includes news, music and features. RHC's English-language broadcasts are heavily centered on the United States and feature news items that uniformly adversely reflect upon the U.S. government and the current administration, especially its foreign policies.

In 2004, RHC and related mediumwave transmitters, such as Radio Rebelde, broadcast speeches by Venezuelan President Hugo Chávez as well as Castro.

RHC was off the air temporarily in late August 2004 due to damage caused by Hurricane Charley.

The English-language service of the station broadcasts an hour-long program which is repeated throughout the day at different times and frequencies (AM and international shortwave as well as FM in Havana). The program consists of a mix of news, commentary, history, music (both traditional and contemporary Cuban music) as well as a series of rotating special programs including the Mailbag Show (in which listener mail is read over the air), Music with a Message (normally featuring an internationally-known musician whose music touches on social justice themes), World of Stamps, the sports program with Eduardo Gonzalez, and DXers Unlimited, a program on the technical aspects of amateur radio and shortwave listening from announcer Arnie Coro (Ham radio call sign CO2KK). The current lead announcers are Ed Newman and Lena Valverde. Arts and Culture segments are normally by Gerwin Jones, a Canadian journalist. Most of the commentary viewpoint segments are by Juan Jacomino.

The shortwave numbers station nicknamed "Atencion", or HM01, by independent shortwave listeners has been linked to RHC radio transmissions equipment. In numbers station transmissions, a series of random numbers are read out over the air in multiple languages, or in digital modes or morse code. These audible transmission of numbers are believed to be one-time encrypted messages to espionage agents residing in the targeted country. Numbers station monitors have noted that on occasion RHC interval signals have been heard at the beginning or end of intelligence-related transmissions. The United States Government convicted the Cuban Five with evidence that was intercepted and decoded from HM01.

== Interval signal ==
The station's interval signal is La Marcha del 26 de Julio (The 26th of July March), written by Agustín Díaz Cartaya.

Sometime during the interval, Thelma Rodriguez gives out the radio identifier details in the Spanish and English languages. "This is/You're listening to Radio Habana Cuba, broadcasting from Cuba, free territory in Americas" (Spanish: "Este es/Estás escuchando Radio Habana Cuba, transmitiendo desde Cuba, territorio libre en America").
