= Radio Reloj =

Cuban radio station

- Cuba
- Broadcast area: Republic of Cuba – Worldwide
- Frequencies: Havana: 790 AM, 950 AM, 101.5 FM; Santa Clara: 570 AM
- Branding: Radio Reloj

Programming
- Language: Spanish
- Format: All-news radio with time checks

Ownership
- Owner: Cuban Institute of Information and Social Communication
- Sister stations: Radio Rebelde; Radio Progreso; Radio Taíno; CMBF Radio Musical Nacional; Radio Enciclopedia

History
- First air date: July 1, 1947

Technical information
- Power: 50,000 watts (AM stations); 6,000 watts (FM station)

Links
- Webcast: Listen live
- Website: www.radioreloj.cu

Radio Reloj (Spanish for 'Clock Radio', pronounced [ˈraðjo reˈlox]) is a government-owned Spanish-language radio station in Cuba. It carries an all-news radio format and is based in Havana.

Radio Reloj is distinguished by its strict "time and news" format, which has remained largely unchanged since its founding. The station features two announcers who read news bulletins in alternating one-minute segments. A constant background ticking, produced by a metronome-like pulse, serves as a rhythmic backdrop to the speech. At the top of every minute, a high-pitched tone sounds, followed by the station's signature identification: the letters "RR" transmitted in Morse code.

The station played a part in the history of Cuba, particularly during the Cuban revolution. On March 13, 1957, student leader José Antonio Echeverría, head of the University Student Federation (FEU), led a group from the Revolutionary Directorate to seize the station's studios. Their goal was to announce the death of dictator Fulgencio Batista, who was simultaneously being targeted in an attack at the Presidential Palace.

Echeverría managed to take the microphone and began a live proclamation, famously starting with "People of Cuba!" However, the broadcast was cut off mid-sentence by station technicians, and the planned uprising failed to materialize as Batista survived the palace attack. Echeverría was killed by police shortly after leaving the building, and the recording of his final broadcast remains a well-known historical artifact in Cuba.

== Frequencies ==
Radio Reloj operates an extensive network of transmitters across the Cuban archipelago, primarily on the Medium Wave (AM) band. While it serves as the official time standard for Cuba, its signals are a frequent target for "DXers" (long-distance radio hobbyists) in the United States. Due to sky-wave propagation, the station's high-powered signals—particularly those on 570 kHz, 790 kHz, and 950 kHz—can be heard clearly across the Gulf Coast and the Eastern Seaboard at night.

The station also broadcasts on several FM frequencies in Cuba, such as 101.5 FM in Havana.

== Listenership outside of Cuba ==
Example of Radio Reloj broadcasting, where the hosts explain the very history of the station.

From its inception in 1947 until the Internet era, Radio Reloj has been occasionally audible in the United States at night. The signals area easier to hear in the southeastern portion of the country. Areas such as the Florida Keys, Southwest Florida and around the Gulf of Mexico are better locations to hear the signal. Even when the announcers may be hard to hear, listeners can identify it from the ticking clock sounds.

A good example of DXing of Radio Reloj was on the morning of 21 January 1999 at 1:20 a.m. (Eastern Time). Radio station WMCA in New York City, assigned to 570 AM, the same as Radio Reloj's Santa Clara signal, went off the air for transmitter maintenance. Once WMCA's carrier signal dropped, Radio Reloj's broadcast could be heard up and down the Eastern Seaboard of the United States including New York City, where WMCA broadcasts originate.

Radio Reloj is available as a free satellite broadcast in Hispasat 30° W. Radio Reloj also broadcasts its programming via an Internet stream from its website.
