= Salsa Kids =

Puerto Rican Latin pop band

- Origin: Puerto Rico
- Genres: Latin pop
- Years active: 1993–
- Label: Rodven Records
- Members: Omar Rodriguez, Esteban Tollinchi, Laz Herrera, Jomy Columbus
- Past members: Angelo Jovet

Salsa Kids are a Latin pop band created in Puerto Rico in 1993 consisting of three members. The original members were Omar Rodriguez, Esteban Tollinchi and Jovet Angelo. Angelo departed in 1997 to pursue a solo career, and was replaced by Laz Herrera and by Jomy Columbus.

Created in the image and likeness of youth groups such as Take That, the band's music fused pop with salsa, merengue, vallenato and other Latin rhythms, including a later touch of flamenco. All music was accompanied by a worked choreography that gave a personal touch.

Their playlist includes Diane Warren's Nadie nos va a detener (Nothing's Gonna Stop Us Now, Spanish Version).

Following Jovenes (1997), their third official album, Nadie Nos Va a Detener, a collection of uptempo, danceable salsa, was released by Rodven Records in 1998.

They Covered Stevie Wonder's Rocket Love on their album "Baila Conmigo"

== Albums ==
- Salsa Kids (1994)
- Salsa Kids (Special Edition) (1995)
- Ski (1996)
- Remixes (1996)
- Jóvenes (1997)
- Nadie nos va a detener (1998)
- Serie Millennium 21 (Double Album) (1999)
- Baila conmigo (2007), Dance with me
