= Multivisión =

Cuban national television network

- Multivisión Logo
- Country: Cuba
- Headquarters: Havana, Cuba

Programming
- Language: Spanish
- Picture format: 480i (SDTV)

Ownership
- Owner: ICRT

History
- Launched: August 7, 2008; 18 years ago

Links
- Website: www.tvcubana.icrt.cu

Availability

Terrestrial
- Nationally: Varying channels

Multivisión, styled as multivisión, is the fifth national network of Cuba, established in 2008 and operated by the ICRT. Its programming primarily consists of imports from other countries, in which they were illegally recorded from other television channels.

== History ==
The channel began broadcasting in 2008 from the five national telecentros, or regional production centers, at hours in which no local programs were being broadcast. However, this forced changes to other stations' schedules, and in the summer of 2009, Multivisión moved to its own TV channels.

== Programming ==
Multivisión's programming includes a mix of telenovelas, series, documentaries (chiefly from National Geographic Channel and DW-TV), music videos and imported children's programs, as well as movies on Sunday nights and American primetime shows in the evenings. Foreign programmings aired on this channel were illegally recorded from other foreign television channels.
