= Cubavisión International =

Cubavision International
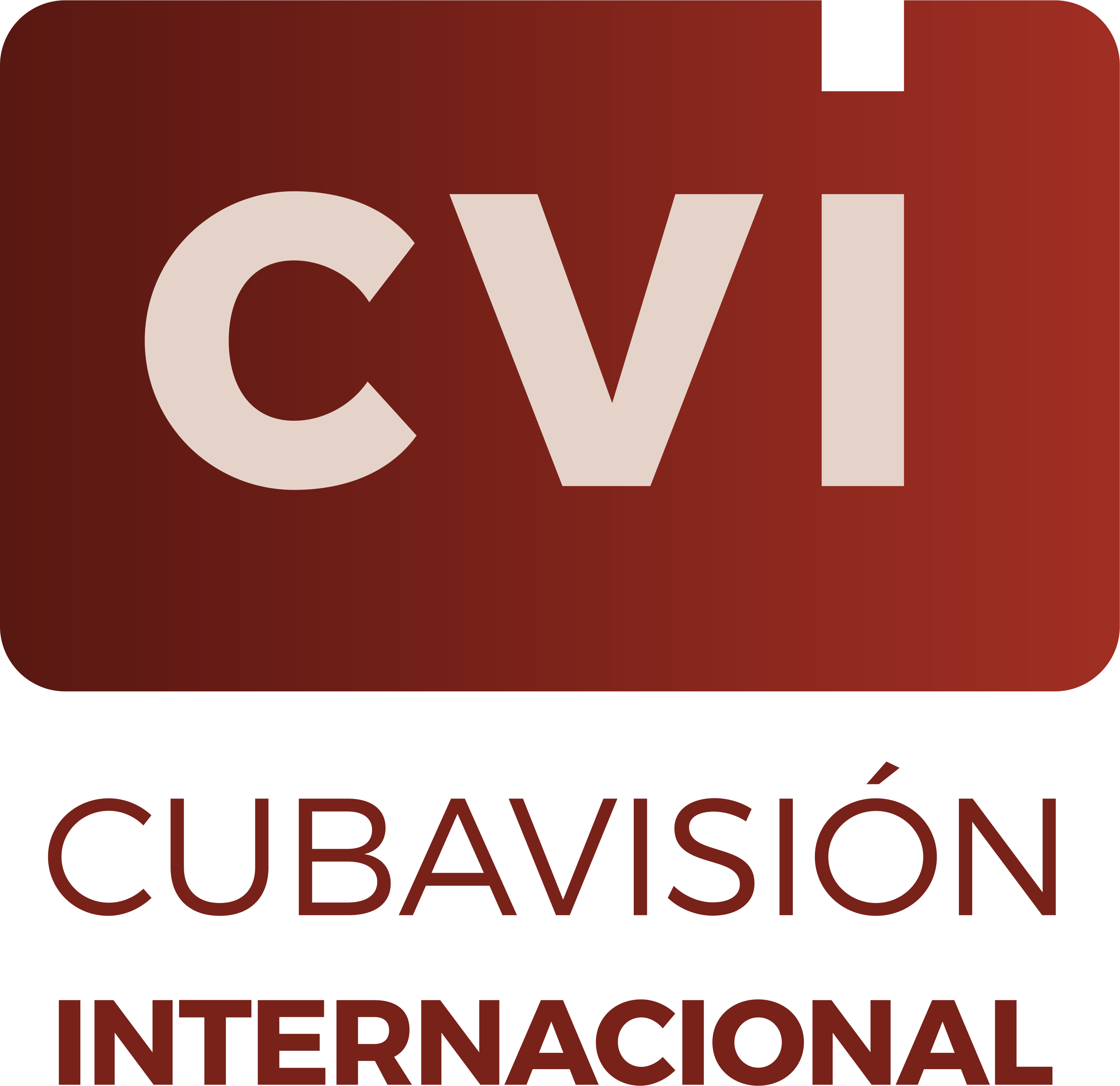
- Country: Cuba
- Broadcast area: Americas, Europe, Northern Africa, Asia and part of Australia
- Affiliates: teleSUR, CGTN Spanish, RT en Español
- Headquarters: Havana, Cuba

Programming
- Language: Spanish
- Picture format: 1080i HDTV (standard definition downscaled according to local television standard)

Ownership
- Owner: ICRT

History
- Launched: July 26, 1986; 39 years ago

Links
- Website: Cubavisión Internacional Spanish

Availability

Streaming media
- Live stream: https://teveo.cu/live/video/AKDdWvMTYzfsfnNJ

Cubavisión International (Spanish: Cubavisión Internacional) is a Cuban free-to-air television channel run by Cuba's national broadcaster, Cuban Institute of Radio and Television. It serves as the worldwide arm of the domestic Cubavisión network.

== History ==
The channel started broadcasting in 1986 airing Cuban programming by satellite reaching out to Cuban fighters in the Angolan Civil War.

On March 23, 2014, the channel was made available on Zap in Angola and Mozambique, due to a diplomatical agreement with the former.

== Programs ==
The channel offers the world a variety of programming, the production of which is entirely Cuban. Among the programming highlights are soap operas, music programs, documentaries on flora and fauna, history of the country, along with news and debate.

== See also ==
- Cuban Institute of Radio and Television
