= Canal Habana =

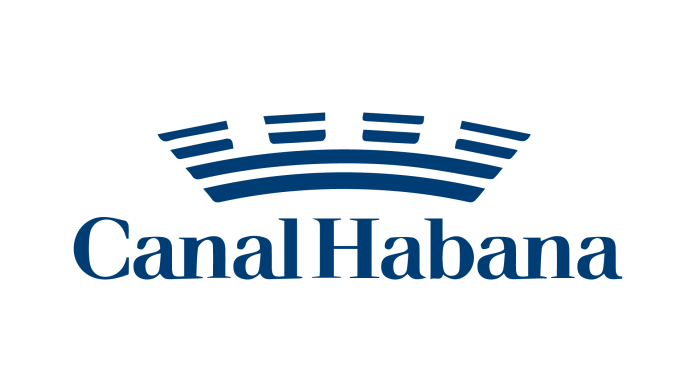
- Country: Cuba
- Broadcast area: Cuba
- Network: Canal Habana
- Headquarters: Havana, Cuba

Programming
- Language: Spanish
- Picture format: 1080i HDTV (rescaled to 480i 16:9 SDTV for standard transmission)

Ownership
- Owner: Cuban Institute of Radio and Television

History
- Launched: January 8, 2006
- Replaced: MiTV

Links
- Website: www.canalhabana.icrt.cu

Canal Habana
La Habana Province; Cuba
- City: Havana
- Channels: Analog: 27 (UHF)

Programming
- Language: Spanish

Ownership
- Owner: ICRT

History
- Founded: 2006

Technical information
- Licensing authority: ETECSA

Links
- Website: www.canalhabana.icrt.cu

Canal Habana is a Cuban public television channel founded in 2006, at the Mazón and San Miguel studios, where television was broadcast for the first time in Cuba, from the old channel CHTV that was broadcast in the City of Havana. The channel is transmitted by air with a reach throughout Havana, occupying the nascent UHF band in the spectrum of the capital of Cuba (Channel 27).

== History ==
On May 7, 1990, the broadcasts of the CHTV channel began, Telecentro that was broadcast in the City of Havana and the old Havana province and that was located on the 18th floor of the Hotel Habana Libre, the channel remained on the air during more than 15 years between 4:30 and 6:00 pm. The channel began with the objective of witnessing the events of the life of Havanans during the difficult days of the Special Period. CHTV was a unique channel because it was a project with young fourth-year students of the Bachelor of Journalism at the University of Havana together with only three professional journalists and a group of engineers, filmmakers and technicians from various areas of the ICRT. In a second moment, he moved to the studios of P and 23 where he consolidated his professional work with investigative and interpretive journalism. On January 28, 2006, the current Canal Habana was founded.
