= Unión Radio Televisión =

Defunct Cuban television station

Unión Radio Televisión, operating under the call sign CMUR-TV, was an early Cuban television station that existed from 1950 until 1953, before the Cuban Revolution expropriated commercial television stations. It was the first to commence operations, two months before CMQ, the current Cubavisión.

== History ==
The station started broadcasting on October 24, 1950 on VHF channel 4, and was backed by Gaspar Pumarejo, who received financial support from the US DuMont Television Network for equipment. The station reportedly opened with a commercial for Competidora Gaditana cigarettes with a jingle by Ñico Saquito; while its inauguration took place with a remote link to the Presidential Palace with the presence of Carlos Prío, the president of the time. Later that evening, an opening ceremony was broadcast, which featured Mexican and Cuban stars, including Pumarejo himself.

Pumarejo announced in its early weeks of operation that he would build a second television station at Santa Clara, which he planned to use as the backbone for a national television network. The goal was to cover all provinces, however, CMQ beat Unión Radio TV in 1952.

In 1951, Pumarejo decided to sell Unión Radio Televisión due to financial difficulties. By early 1952, the station operated in two non-continuous periods, from 10:30am to around 1pm, and again from 6pm to after 11pm.

On October, 1953, Union Radio Television changed its name to Television Nacional. During the mid-1950s, the station received interference from Miami station WTVJ.

The station competed head-to-head with CMQ (which started in December 1950) in several sectors such as the exporting of actors and scripts for telenovelas, as well as inviting national and international music stars, at a time when Havana was at its cultural apex.

On January 1, 1959, following the triumph of the Cuban Revolution led by Fidel Castro, Unión Radio Televisión was nationalized. It continued operating for some time before falling under the control of the ICRT, which had a rationalized channel line-up (channels 2, 4 and 6). The station in 1960 was operating alongside channel 2, which was CMBF-TV. Channel 4 was dropped at an unknown date; channel 2 later housed a second ICRT channel, which in the 1970s was replaced by Tele Rebelde, originally from Santiago de Cuba, while channel 6, the former CMQ, became the main ICRT network.
