= Canal Educativo =

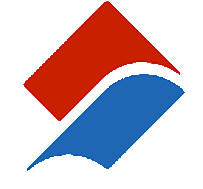
- Headquarters: Havana, Cuba

History
- Launched: May 9, 2002; 24 years ago

Links
- Website: www.canaleducativo.icrt.cu

Canal Educativo is a Cuban television channel devoted to educational programming. Operated by the ICRT, it began operations on 9 May 2002.

== History ==
Prior to the establishment of Canal Educativo, there was no designated home for educational programming among Cuba's national television portfolio. The establishment of this network enabled the delivery of telecourses and the use of school hours to broadcast content. Canal Educativo covers 87.9% of the Cuban population.

The first broadcast was held on 9 May 2002 at Teatro Austral, with a speech delivered by Fidel Castro.

In 2004, a second network, Canal Educativo 2 (currently abbreviated ce2 on air), was launched.

== Programming ==
Canal Educativo's programming includes telecourses, documentaries, historical programs, and arts programming including opera, ballet and musical performances. It also reportedly airs cartoons such as SpongeBob SquarePants.
