= Canal Caribe =

- Headquarters: Havana, Cuba

Programming
- Language: Spanish

Ownership
- Owner: Institute of Information and Social Communication

History
- Launched: 2017; 9 years ago

Links
- Website: www.canalcaribe.icrt.cu

Canal Caribe is a Cuban state news television channel run by the Institute of Information and Social Communication (ICS), formerly ICRT.

== History ==
Canal Caribe was founded in 2017 as a current affairs channel run by young journalists. It was established to air throughout the day and fill gaps between news shows on other channels.

== Content ==
The content of Canal Caribe, like other ICS channels, is controlled by the Cuban government. Since 2023, it has co-produced the news program "Contextos" with Chinese state broadcaster CGTN.

The channel covers domestic and international news, and broadcasts in HD.
