= Radio Enciclopedia =

Radio Encyclopedia Enciclopedia de radio
- Havana, Cuba; Cuba
- Broadcast area: Cuba (Local transmitters); Worldwide (Internet stream)
- Frequencies: 1260 kHz (CMBQ); 530 kHz (CMBR)
- Branding: Radio Enciclopedia

Programming
- Language: Spanish
- Format: Classical music Beautiful music

Ownership
- Owner: Cuban Institute of Information and Social Communication

History
- First air date: 7 November 1962

Technical information
- Repeaters: Havana: 94.1 MHz FM; Cuban borders: 530 kHz AM

Links
- Webcast: icecast.teveo.cu
- Website: radioenciclopedia.cu

Radio Enciclopedia (Spanish: Enciclopedia de radio) is a classical / beautiful music radio network of transmitters broadcast throughout Cuba on medium wave (AM) and VHF (FM). The main frequencies in Havana are 94.1 MHz (FM) and 1260 kHz (AM). It can also be heard for several hundred miles beyond Cuba's borders on 530 kHz (AM) and worldwide via the Internet. It broadcasts soft instrumental music with occasional news and cultural programming. It is one of four main radio stations in Cuba and first broadcast on November 7, 1962.
