= Cubavisión =

Cuban national television network

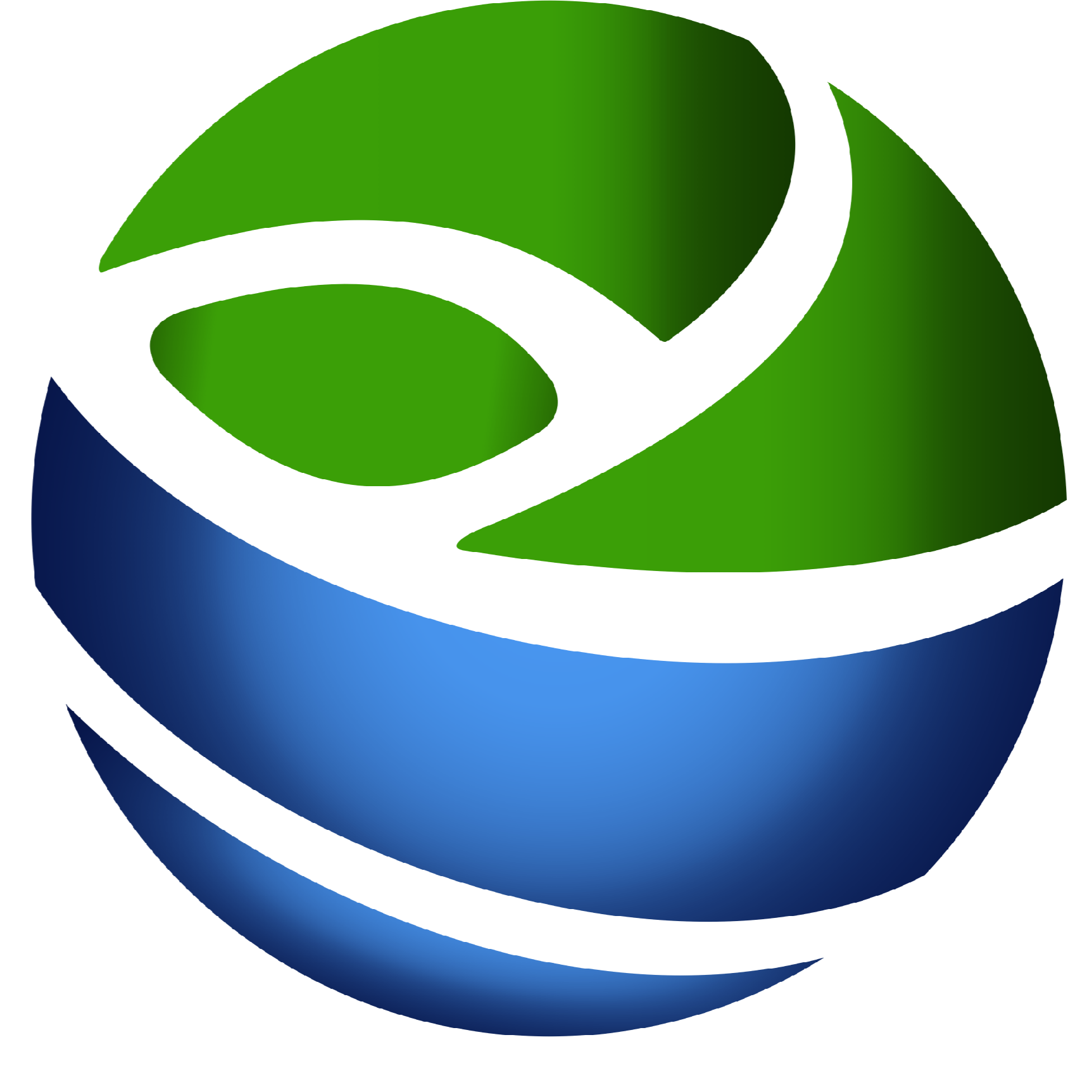
- Country: Cuba
- Broadcast area: Cuba
- Network: Cubavisión
- Headquarters: Havana, Cuba

Programming
- Language: Spanish
- Picture format: 1080i HDTV (downscaled to 480i for the SDTV feed)

Ownership
- Owner: Cuban Institute of Radio and Television

History
- Founded: 1951 (as CMQ), November 4, 1989 (as Cubavisión)
- Launched: March 21, 1951; 74 years ago
- Founder: Government of Cuba
- Replaced: CMQ-TV
- Former names: Canal 6 Cuba

Links
- Webcast: https://teveo.cu/live/video/G9bkUAyaJDwyJh5S
- Website: t.me/Cubavisionelcanaldetodos

Availability

Terrestrial
- Digital TV: Channel numbers may vary by area.

Cubavision is a Cuban television channel owned by the Cuban government. It airs nationally 24 hours a day and has a cable version with a global reach called Cubavision International.

== History ==
The origins of Cubavision go back to December 10, 1950, with the first transmissions of CMQ-TV, channel 6. This commercial channel started its regular transmissions on March 21, 1951. By 1954, it had become a national network, encompassing seven stations.

In 1959, with the conclusion of the Cuban Revolution, CMQ-TV, like the other means of communication in the country, ended up under the control of the government. Subsequently, on February 27, 1961, with the disappearance of commercial advertising in Cuban media, the Cuban Government assumed the financing of the television channels.

In 1967, the first Telecenters (regional centers of television) were born and the use of video tape was introduced. In 1975, Cubavisión began its color broadcasts, and in the following years began to develop satellite transmissions, including the beginning of Cubavisión Internacional in 1986.

In 2025, the channel was suffering a debt. In May that year, it lost its analog signal in Villa Clara, rendering the transmitter obsolete due to lack of equipment; while its digital signal in Santiago de Cuba was turned off for five months. A few months later, it almost suspended the broadcast of telenovelas from TV Globo's catalog. The channel announced in October the arrival of Terra e Paixão, which is only shown three times a week (Tuesdays, Thursdays and Saturdays at 8:45pm after the news) to cut costs, while local productions are shown in the same timeslot on other days of the week, far from achieving the popularity of Brazilian productions. Globo's telenovelas are popular in the country since they were introduced in 1985.
