= Cuban Institute of Radio and Television =

State broadcaster of Cuba

Cuban Institute of Radio and Television (CIRT)
- Spanish: Instituto Cubano de Radio y Televisión (ICRT)

Agency overview
- Formed: 22 August 1922 (radio); 24 October 1950 (television)
- Dissolved: 24 August 2021
- Website: Official website

The Cuban Institute of Radio and Television (Spanish: Instituto Cubano de Radio y Televisión; ICRT) was the government agency responsible for the control of radio and television broadcasters in Cuba. On 24 August 2021, the institute ceased to operate and was replaced by the Institute of Information and Social Communication.

== History ==
Former logo (1990s–2006)

Cuba was one of the first countries in the Americas to have radio and television service. In 1922, under the cooperation of the US-based International Telephone and Telegraph, the first radio station in the country (2LC) began broadcasts on 22 August. However, the first regular broadcasts were made by the PWX on 10 October, with the issuance of a speech by President Alfredo Zayas y Alfonso. The radio stations in the country were developed by private initiatives, and their programming was initially based on news and entertainment.

The popularity of radio led to the development and launch of television stations. The first years of television in Cuba were marked by a climate of competitiveness between two Cuban businessmen who were backed by US companies, Gaspar Pumarejo by DuMont and Goar Mestre by RCA Victor. Mestre started construction of a building called Radio Center, inspired by the Radio City in New York, while Gaspar Pumarejo tried to develop a television studio in his own home in his quest to be the first in establishing a TV station.

Pumarejo's channel 4 (Unión Radio Televisión) was the first TV channel to start broadcasts in the island; it began broadcasting on 24 October 1950 with an address by President Carlos Prío Socarrás from the Presidential Palace. Mestre began broadcasts on Channel 6 (CMQ) on 18 December of that year, and both networks would develop a program format similar to their radio brethren, in addition to live sports and special events. On 18 February 1953, Channel 2 (Telemundo) began its broadcasts.

With the advent of the Cuban Revolution in 1959, the new government applied a series of measures that transformed all national media. Radio Rebelde, the first radio station developed under the revolution, started broadcasting on 24 February.

Cuba was one of the first countries to have color television, but after the Revolution color broadcasting was suspended until 1970s.

During the early years of the revolution there was a division between the mainstream media in Cuba, created with private capital and oriented against the new political situation and a series of small radio stations whose editorial line was in favor of the new government, which organized an "Independent Front of Free Broadcasters" (Spanish: Frente Independiente de Emisoras Libres). These radio stations were recognized as official by the new government. The government would develop a Bureau of Broadcasting, attached to the Ministry of Communications and under the political leadership of the Communist Party of Cuba. Private television stations were expropriated; Mestre's channel 6 was taken over by the state in 1960. Radio stations and television channels in the country were completely put under state control on 24 May 1962 under the management of the newly established Cuban Broadcasting Institute. Under the new broadcasting system, all media were to meet a set of values established by the government to strengthen the political process in the country, some names of TV and radio stations were changed, and the coverage of the TV and radio services were extended to reach the whole country. In 1975, the agency changed its name to the Cuban Institute of Radio and Television.

In 1975, color broadcasting resumed. ICRT adapted the Soviet UEIT testcard to use it with NTSC television system.

On 24 August 2021, the Cuban government announced that the institute would cease to operate and that the government would manage communications through a new agency called the Institute of Information and Social Communication.

== Channels ==
=== Radio ===
The ICRT has several nationwide radio stations:

- Radio Rebelde
- Radio Progreso
- Radio Taíno
- Radio Reloj
- CMBF Radio Musical Nacional
- Radio Enciclopedia

Related:

- Cuban Radio Official Website in english
- Cuban Radio Official Website in spanish

The ICRT also has several regional radio stations and Radio Havana Cuba, an international broadcaster.

=== Television ===
Cuba has five national television channels, which are known for airing various kinds of locally produced programming (soap operas, recitals, documentaries and comedy programs), but these networks also have begun airing foreign children and family-focused programming, even from the United States.

- Cubavisión (founded in 1950 (as CMQ), 1989)
- Tele Rebelde (founded in 1968)
- Canal Educativo (founded 2001)
- Canal Educativo 2 (founded in 2004) TeleSUR 24/7
- Multivisión (founded in 2008)
- Canal Caribe (founded in 2017; Channel News)

The institute also includes a network of provincial channels; Cubavision International, which broadcasts via a number of satellite services; and the Cuban Television Information System (Sistema Informativo de la Televisión Cubana), the national producer of all TV news programs aired on the ICRT stations as well as of important state events.

== See also ==
- Media of Cuba
- List of newspapers in Cuba
- Telecommunications in Cuba
- Internet in Cuba
- Censorship in Cuba
