= Radio Progreso =

Cuban national radio station

Radio Progreso is a Cuban Spanish language radio station. Founded on 15 December 1929, it has provided musical and other cultural programmes ever since. Live performances are held in Studio 1 (Estudio Uno) which holds an audience of 300 people. The slogan of Radio Progreso is La Onda de la Alegria ("The Airwave of Happiness").

== Frequencies ==
Shortwave radio listeners can hear Radio Progreso on 4.765 MHz at night via its transmitter in Bauta, Cuba. In the southern United States, Radio Progreso can frequently be heard at night on multiple mediumwave (AM frequencies). The following table is taken from an animated banner on Radio Progreso's website with additional information (call sign, power for the AM stations) from the U.S. FCC records which rely on official data that are not necessarily accurate and only partly consistent with Radio Progeso's website.

Location	Call sign	Power [kW]	AM Frequency [kHz]	FM frequency [MHz]
Baracoa			700	
Camagüey	CMHA	30	630	
Chambas			890	
Ciego de Ávila	CMIB	10	820	
Cienfuegos	CMFC	1	750	
Granma			800	
Guantánamo	CMMB	10	810	94.3
Holguín (Cacocum)	CMKB	200/50	900	98.5
Isla de la Juventud			730	
La Habana	CMBC		640	90.3
Las Tunas	CMLA	10	640	
Mantua			880	
Matanzas			690	94.5
Mayarí	CMJB	1	850	
Moa			820	
Pilón			920	
Pinar del Río	CMAB	30	880	
Sancti Spíritus			940	
Santiago de Cuba			690	99.3
Trinidad	CMGB	1	850	
Villa Clara			660	
