= Radio Rebelde =

Cuban national radio station

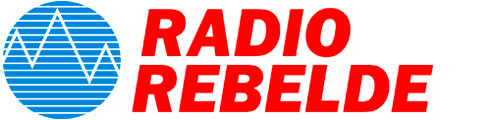
- Type: Radio network
- Country: Cuba
- Headquarters: Cuban Institute of Radio and Television (ICRT); 258 23rd Street, Vedado, Havana

Ownership
- Owner: Communist Party of Cuba; Cuban Institute of Information and Social Communication
- Key people: Gerardo Calderín Gainza (General Director); Agustín Taquechel Campos (Chief Editor); Ernesto Che Guevara (Founder)

History
- Launch date: February 24, 1958

Coverage
- Availability: Cuba (AM/SW/FM transmitters); Worldwide (SW transmitter/internet stream)

Links
- Webcast: radiorebelde.cu (AM radio) radiorebelde.cu (FM radio)
- Website: radiorebelde.cu

Radio Rebelde (English: Rebel Radio) is a Cuban Spanish-language radio station. It broadcasts 24 hours a day with a varied program of national and international music hits of the moment, news reports and live sport events. The station was set up in 1958 by Che Guevara in the Sierra Maestra region of eastern Cuba, and was designed to broadcast the aims of the 26th of July Movement led by Fidel Castro.

Transmitting on short-wave, Radio Rebelde also broadcast the latest combat news, music and spoken literature to the people of Cuba during the Cuban Revolution. Today, Radio Rebelde has 44 transmitters on the FM dial covering 98 percent of the island of Cuba, plus a short-wave signal on the 60-meter band on 5.025 MHz (5,025 kHz), and several AM transmitters on various frequencies, most commonly 530, 540, 550, 560, 600, 610, 620, 670, 710, 770, 1180, 1550 and 1620 kHz; and on FM 96.7 MHz in Havana.

== History ==
The radio broadcasts were initiated in February 1958 by the rebel army's media wing, under Guevara's supervision. Guevara had reportedly been impressed by the power of radio after experiencing first hand the role of a CIA clandestine radio station, La Voz de la Liberación, in ousting the government of Jacobo Arbenz in Guatemala. An electric generator and the first radio equipment had arrived in Pata de la Mesa, Guevara's command post, where the rebels were to set up the clandestine station and begin broadcasting.

Early broadcast efforts were conducted by Luis Orlando Rodríguez, who later became Minister for the Interior. The first broadcast began with the announcement: "Aquí Radio Rebelde, the voice of the Sierra Maestra, transmitting for all Cuba on the 20-meter band at 5 and 9 pm daily... I'm station director Capt. Luis Orlando Rodríguez."

Later, Carlos Franqui arrived from Miami, United States, to become the movement's overall director of information. Soon, as the fighting intensified, Franqui and the transmitter relocated to Fidel Castro's command post in La Plata, Cuba.

The broadcasts became a vital source of communication due to increased government restrictions on the Cuban press. A new boosted transmitter in La Plata carried lengthy interviews and speeches by Fidel Castro and provided radiotelephone communication between the rebel columns throughout the region. Expansions in rebel numbers and more ambitious military ventures away from the group's base in the Sierra Maestra meant that each fighting column needed its own radio equipment. Eventually 32 Rebelde stations were operating throughout Cuba. The stations broadcast nightly, with each broadcast beginning with the loud declaration "¡Aquí Radio Rebelde!" ("Here's Radio Rebelde!") that has remained the station's trademark salutation to the present day, followed by the Cuban national anthem and the 26th of July hymn.

On April 9, 1958, the station broadcast calls for the nation's workers to join in a general strike. Rebelde also broadcast the first reports that Guevara's column had taken Santa Clara on New Year's Eve 1958, and on the first morning of the new year Castro broadcast a call for another general strike. During the transmission he rejected any attempts by the Cuban military to replace Fulgencio Batista by a coup d'état and urged his revolutionary force to press on to the cities of Havana and Santiago. His final words were "¡Revolución Sí, Golpe Militar No!" (Revolution Yes, Military coup No!). Within hours the army had surrendered in full. In turn, Venezuelan stations Radio Rumbos and Radio Continent retransmitted the war reports of Radio Rebelde so that listeners would be informed of the advances of the Castro guerillas and the setbacks of the dictator Batista.

== See also ==
- Radio stations in Cuba
