= Jesús Joel Díaz Hernández =

Cuban journalist

- Occupation: journalist
- Known for: 1999-2001 imprisonment

Jesús Joel Díaz Hernández is a Cuban journalist who was imprisoned by the Cuban government from 1999–2001. His imprisonment attracted protest from several human rights organizations, including Amnesty International, which named him a prisoner of conscience.

Prior to his arrest, Díaz Hernández was executive director of the Cooperativa Avileña de Periodistas Independientes (CAPI), an independent news agency that sought to challenge the state monopoly on news. Censorship in Cuba is commonplace, with its media under the supervision of the Communist Party's Department of Revolutionary Orientation. In 2006, The Committee to Protect Journalists named it the seventh most censored nation in the world, and the 2011 Freedom of the Press report of the press NGO Freedom House named it the most censored country in the Americas. As a journalist unaligned with the government, Díaz Hernández reportedly suffered repeated threats and harassment, including an "acto de repudio" ("act of repudiation") in which he was subjected to public criticism for his "counterrevolutionary" views. In 1997, he was briefly detained by police, and the following year, he was attacked in the street following a meeting of independent journalists.

On 18 January 1999, Díaz Hernández was arrested, and in a trial the following day, convicted of "dangerousness", defined by the Cuban penal code as "the special proclivity of a person to commit crimes as demonstrated by behaviour that manifestly contradicts the norms of socialist morals". He had previously received six warnings on the charge. Human Rights Watch reported that the court based its verdict on evidence that Díaz Hernández had met with delinquents and disturbed the public order. He was sentenced to four years' imprisonment in Canaleta Prison in Morón.

Both Human Rights Watch and Amnesty International criticized his trial as unfair, stating that his lawyer did not have sufficient time to prepare a defense. The latter organization named Díaz Hernández a prisoner of conscience, calling for his immediate release. His arrest was also criticized by The Committee to Protect Journalists, who alleged that it was part of a broad "crackdown" on the non-government aligned press, and by Reporters Without Borders, who wrote to Fidel Castro to demand his release. Díaz Hernández himself went on hunger strike to protest his detention for the first ten days of his imprisonment.

Díaz Hernández was released in January 2001. He briefly returned to his work with CAPI, but fearing that another arrest was imminent, he emigrated to the US in March 2002. He was granted asylum and settled in Fort Worth, Texas.
