= Sinking of tugboat 13 de Marzo =

1994 death of Cuban asylum seekers

- Location: Off the coast of Cuba
- Date: 13 July 1994
- Target: Cubans fleeing the country in stolen tugboat
- Deaths: 41
- Perpetrator: Border Troops of the Republic of Cuba

The sinking of the tugboat 13 de Marzo was an incident on July 13, 1994, when 72 Cubans attempted to leave the island of Cuba on a stolen tugboat diverted by its captain, to seek asylum in the United States. 41 passengers, including 10 children, drowned at sea when the tugboat sank. It was alleged that the Cuban coast guard deliberately sank the commandeered vessel and then merely proceeded to rescue the survivors. The Cuban government stated that the boat was sunk by accident.

== Incident ==
On July 13, 1994, at approximately three in the morning, seventy-two men, women, and children commandeered the tugboat 13 de Marzo ("13th of March"), intending to seek asylum in the United States. With all vessels in Cuba owned by the state, it would have been illegal to acquire such a boat.

In the early hours of 13 July 1994, four boats of the Cuban government, equipped with high-pressure water hoses, rammed the old 13 de Marzo 7 miles from the bay of Havana. As a result of this action, the tugboat eventually sank, leaving 41 dead, including 10 minors. According to testimony from the survivors (31 people), the crews of the tugboats Polargo 2 and Polargo 5 intentionally rammed the 13 de Marzo.

To the present day, the Cuban government maintains that the incident was an accident and has said that it neither tried nor convicted any of the participants in the event, despite the penal code establishing in its Article 48 penalties for crimes committed through negligence.

Cuba Archive, a human rights organization which promotes human rights in Cuba, alleged that the Cuban coast guard deliberately sank the commandeered vessel and then refused to rescue some of the passengers. According to survivor María Victoria García, whose ten-year-old son, husband, and other close family members died, but who eventually resettled in the United States in 1999, the government vessels refused to provide assistance to some of the distressed passengers. As a result, only 31 survivors were pulled from the water. She said:

After nearly an hour of battling in the open sea, the boat circled round the survivors, creating a whirlpool so that we would drown. Many disappeared into the seas... We asked them to save us, but they just laughed, they then told us to jam random objects up our noses.

The Cuban government denied responsibility.

== Response ==
The following day, the official newspaper Granma reported that "a tugboat stolen by antisocial elements had capsized and that 31 people had survived: 20 men, 5 women, and 6 minors, with an unknown number of people missing." . Later, on 5 August of the same year, Cuban president Fidel Castro described the actions of the state agents involved as a "truly patriotic effort". International leaders, including Pope John Paul II, made statements about the incident and expressed their condolences to the victims.

Amnesty International said the following with regard to the involvement of the Cuban Government: "There is sufficient evidence to indicate that it was an official operation and that, if events occurred in the way described by several of the survivors, those who died as a result of the incident were victims of extrajudicial execution."

The Inter-American Commission on Human Rights (IACHR), an organ of the Organization of American States (OAS), opened case file No. 11.436 in 1995 following complaints received from survivors of the tragedy and human rights groups.

On 13 July 2005, around twenty Cuban opposition members demonstrated in memory of the victims of this incident. Some of them, including Lázaro Alonso, Yusimi Gil, Emilio Leiva, and Manuel Pérez, were detained by the Cuban authorities. Manuel Pérez explained to the journalists present: "We wanted to pay tribute to the people who died because they were trying to flee Cuba".

Although Fidel Castro publicly admitted that those responsible for the tragedy had neither orders nor jurisdiction to carry out their actions, they have never been brought to justice.

== See also ==
- Human rights in Cuba
- Censorship in Cuba
- Cuban dissident movement
- Illegal emigration
- Cuban immigration to the United States
- Mariel boatlift
- Maleconazo
- 1994 Cuban rafter crisis
