= Christian Democrat Organization of America =

Political international in America

Logo of the organization

The Christian Democrat Organization of America (ODCA, Spanish: Organización Demócrata Cristiana de América; Portuguese: Organização Democrata Cristã da América) is an international organization made up of political parties, groups, and associations in North America and South America that promote the principles of Christian humanism. Affiliated with the Centrist Democrat International, it is a regional partner of the European People's Party and regional organizations of Christian Democratic parties in Asia and Africa.

Each of the member parties is different, sometimes having differing views of Christian democracy itself. Some of the member parties are in government in their country, others are in the coalition government, and others are not in government. Currently, there are 30 member political parties in 21 countries with a constituency representing 30% of all registered voters in Latin America and 10% of the entire population of the region.

== History ==
On April 23, 1947, during a meeting in Montevideo (Uruguay), a group of politicians from Argentina, Brazil, Chile, and Uruguay agreed on the need to create an international organization of Christian Democrats in Latin America. Later they were joined by representatives of the Christian Democrats of Bolivia and Peru. At the Montevideo meeting, an "International Section" was created, which included Manuel Vicente Ordonez (Argentina), Trisao de Ataide (Brazil), Eduardo Frei Montalva (Chile), and Dardo Regules (Uruguay). The declaration adopted by the participants in the Montevideo meeting on April 23, 1947, proclaimed the goal of the new organization to create a movement on a supranational basis that would contribute to the achievement of real political, economic, and cultural democracy based on the principles of Christian humanism, respect for the human person and the spirit of community development, opposing totalitarianism.

On July 25–31, 1949, a second meeting was held at the Catholic Club of Montevideo with the participation of representatives from Argentina, Brazil, Colombia, Chile, Peru, and Uruguay, which were joined by politicians from Ecuador and Bolivia.

On July 29, 1961, the World Christian Democratic Union (now the Centrist Democratic International) was founded in Santiago, Chile. Since the founding of the Christian Democratic International, the Christian Democratic Organization of America has been a part of it and a regional organization.

At the XVI Congress on October 8, 2000, in Santiago, Chile, the organization's current strategy was formulated, aimed at increasing the participation in its work of humanist and centrist parties, whose views are close to Christian democracy.

At an extraordinary congress in Panama City (Panama) on May 7, 2011, the Charter was approved, which currently regulates the activities of the organization.

On August 9, 2025, the organization suspended the Chilean Christian Democratic Party for its support of Jeannette Jara, candidate of the Communist Party of Chile in the 2025 Chilean general elections. The organization argued that the "Communist Party of Chile has ideological affinities with authoritarian regimes responsible for human rights violations, such as those of Venezuela, Cuba, and Nicaragua. This support not only contradicts the historical legacy of Christian Humanism in Chile, but also undermines the international credibility of the ODCA as a defender of democracy and republican values."

=== Congresses ===
- I Congress — April 23, 1947, Montevideo (Uruguay)
- II Congress — July 25–31, 1949, Montevideo (Uruguay)
- III Congress — December 1955, Santiago (Chile)
- IV Congress — September 1957, Sao Paulo (Brazil)
- V Congress — October 1959, Lima (Peru)
- VI Congress — 1964, Caracas (Venezuela)
- VII Congress — December 1969, Santo Domingo (Dominican Republic)
- VIII Congress — August 29 - September 1, 1974, Willemstad (Curacao)
- IX Congress — November 1977, Caracas (Venezuela)
- X Congress — December 3–5, 1981, Caracas (Venezuela)
- XI Congress — 1985
- XII Congress — 1990
- XIII Congress — November 28–30, 1991, Caracas (Venezuela)
- XIV Congress — July 1–2, 1995, San Jose (Costa Rica)
- XV Congress — April 2–4, 1998, San Jose (Costa Rica)
- XVI Congress — October 8, 2000, Santiago (Chile)
- XVII Congress — October 25, 2003, Caracas (Venezuela)
- XVIII Congress — November 11, 2006, Santiago (Chile)
- XIX Congress — July 30–31, 2010, San Salvador (El Salvador)
- XX Congress — 23–24 August 2013, Mexico City (Mexico)

== Structure ==
The highest organ of the Christian Democratic Organization of America is the Congress, which elects the Council and the Steering Committee, as well as the Presidium, which, together with the Executive Secretariat, exercises the operational leadership of the organization.

- Chairman — Jorge Moreno Osejo (Mexico)
- Executive Secretary — Francisco Javier Jara (Chile)

== Political parties ==
=== Member parties ===
- Argentina – Christian Democratic Party
- Argentina – Justicialist Party
- Aruba – Aruban People's Party
- Bolivia – Christian Democratic Party
- Bolivia – Democrat Social Movement
- Brazil – Brazil Union
- Caribbean Netherlands – Bonaire Patriotic Union
- Caribbean Netherlands – Windward Islands People's Movement
- Chile – Christian Democratic Party (suspended as of 2025)
- Colombia – Colombian Conservative Party
- Costa Rica – Social Christian Unity Party
- Cuba – Cuban Democratic Directorate
- Cuba – Christian Democratic Party of Cuba
- Cuba – Christian Liberation Movement
- Cuba – Cuban Democratic Project
- Curaçao – National People's Party
- Dominican Republic – Social Christian Reformist Party
- Ecuador – Christian Democratic Union
- El Salvador – Christian Democratic Party
- Haiti – Rally of Progressive National Democrats
- Honduras – Christian Democratic Party of Honduras
- Honduras – National Party of Honduras
- Mexico – National Action Party
- Panama – People's Party
- Paraguay – Christian Democratic Party
- Peru – Christian People's Party
- Trinidad and Tobago – United National Congress
- Uruguay – Christian Democratic Party of Uruguay
- Venezuela – COPEI

=== Observer parties ===
- Brazil – Brazilian Social Democracy Party
- Brazil – Christian Democracy
- Guatemala – Guatemalan Christian Democracy
- Peru – Christian Democrat Party
- Venezuela – National Convergence

== See also ==
- Centrist Democrat International
