= Human rights in Cuba =

Among the complaints of violations of Human rights in Cuba as of 2026 are repression and punishment of dissent and public criticism, arbitrary detention, harassment, and intimidation of government critics, independent activists, journalists and political opponents by authorities, lack of due process, including the right to fair and public hearings before an impartial and independent judiciary; overcrowding and unsanitary conditions, lack of access to adequate food and water for those imprisoned; economic privation such as prolonged electricity blackouts, acute shortages of essential goods and services -- food, medicine, and others; government control of all media, censorship and restriction of outside information, critics and independent journalists, prohibitively high prices for internet access; restrictions on recognition for transgender people; restrictions on religion such as laws against holding worship services in private homes even in areas without churches. At least some Human Rights groups see Cuba's policies in the context of the long-standing embargo of the country by Cuba's much larger neighbor (the United States). Several "independent UN experts" have argued that the Trump administration's designation of Cuba as a state sponsor of terrorism has had adverse human rights and humanitarian impacts on the country's people and runs contrary to international law.

Some of the organizations scrutinizing and criticizing the state of human rights in Cuba include Human Rights Watch, Amnesty International, Cubalex, Cuban Observatory of Human Rights. In addition, the International Committee for Democracy in Cuba led by former statesmen Václav Havel of the Czech Republic, José María Aznar of Spain and Patricio Aylwin of Chile was created to support the Cuban dissident movement.

== History ==
During Spanish colonization, the oppression of the indigenous populations was chronicled at length by clergyman Bartolomé de las Casas. The subsequent transportation of African slaves to the island, which lasted over 300 years, led to British military intervention and a determination "to put a stop to these abuses". Since Cuba achieved independence in 1902, successive Cuban governments have been criticised and condemned by various groups, both within Cuba and internationally, for human rights violations on the island. During the latter part of the Spanish colonial era in Cuba, human rights on the island became a particular international concern. After a visit to the region in 1898, U.S. Senator Redfield Proctor estimated that up to 200,000 Cubans had died from starvation and disease within "Spanish forts", essentially concentration camps. The concern was a contributory factor in garnering support for the Spanish–American War in the U.S.

After independence, and following a sustained period of instability, the 1924–33 capitalist government of Gerardo Machado proved to be authoritarian. Machado extended his rule until Fulgencio Batista led an uprising called the Revolt of the Sergeants as part of a coup which deposed Machado in 1933. Batista then became the strongman behind a succession of puppet presidents until he was himself elected president in 1940. According to Hugh Thomas, the post-Machado period was marked by violent reprisals, mass lynchings and a deterioration towards corruption and gansterismo throughout the island.

From 1940, Cuba had a multiparty electoral system until Fulgencio Batista (President from 1940 to 1944) staged a coup with military backing on March 10, 1952.

To quell the growing discontent amongst the populace—which was subsequently displayed through frequent student riots and demonstrations—Batista established tighter censorship of the media, while also utilizing his Bureau for the Repression of Communist Activities secret police to carry out wide-scale violence, torture and public executions. These murders mounted in 1957, as socialist ideas became more influential. Many people were killed, with estimates ranging from hundreds to about 20,000 people killed.

On October 6, 1960, Senator John F. Kennedy, in the midst of his campaign for the U.S. presidency, decried Batista's relationship with the U.S. government and criticized the Eisenhower administration for supporting him:

Fulgencio Batista murdered 20,000 Cubans in seven years ... and he turned Democratic Cuba into a complete police state—destroying every individual liberty. Yet our aid to his regime, and the ineptness of our policies, enabled Batista to invoke the name of the United States in support of his reign of terror. Administration spokesmen publicly praised Batista—hailed him as a staunch ally and a good friend—at a time when Batista was murdering thousands, destroying the last vestiges of freedom, and stealing hundreds of millions of dollars from the Cuban people, and we failed to press for free elections.

In 1958, Time magazine wrote: "Cuba's fanatic, poorly armed rebels last week tried to smash President Fulgencio Batista with the ultimate weapon of civilian revolutions: the general strike. ... Fulgencio Batista got ready for the strike by offering immunity to anyone who killed a striker and by threatening to jail any employer who closed shop." During the strike, militants and youths stole guns, and threw bombs (one of which may have set up a gas-mains fire), after which some people were killed in clashes."

According to Time magazine, "The strike was short-lived: "With the upper hand, Batista drove boldly around the city while his cops proceeded to make their supremacy complete. When a patrol car radioed that it had clashed with rebels and had 'a dead man and a prisoner', the dispatcher ordered: 'Shoot him.' At midafternoon, cops burst into a boardinghouse, grabbed three young men who were leaders of Cuba's lay Catholic Action movement, which sympathizes with Castro. Two hours later their stripped, tortured and bullet-torn bodies were turned over to relatives. Total dead: 43."

In 1959, Fidel Castro and his forces succeeded in displacing Batista from power. At that time there were fundamental changes in the judicial and political process. During this transitional period there were some concerns voiced about due process.

The "Cuban National Reconciliation Movement," a U.S.-based organisation that says it acts as a forum for discussing Cuban society, has detailed what it believes are complex variables when analysing human rights immediately after the revolution. In the 1960s, violent confrontations known as the Escambray Rebellion between the Cuban government and armed opposition were ongoing, but had declined by the early 1970s. The group states that by the time international human rights movements flourished in the 1970s, the most severe period of repression was over, making non-partisan retrospective assessments of the period difficult. The reconciliation movement also cites the difficulties in assessing accounts of abuses that are commonly split upon partisan lines. According to the group, Cuban exiles who were often the first to denounce the Cuban government, largely shared an anti-Communist ideology and overlooked violations committed by other regimes, whilst many left leaning observers did not give the claims of Cuban victims due consideration.

After coming to power in 1959, Fidel Castro's government built a highly effective machinery of repression, according to Human Rights Watch.

As early as September 1959, Vadim Kotchergin (or Kochergin), a KGB agent, was seen in Cuba. Jorge Luis Vasquez, a Cuban who was imprisoned in East Germany, states that the East German secret police Stasi trained the personnel of the Cuban Interior Ministry (MININT).

=== Political executions ===
Various estimates have been made in order to ascertain the number of political executions which have been carried out on behalf of the Cuban government since the revolution. During the first two months of 1959, Castro's government executed more than 300 Batista officials, with Latin American historian Thomas E. Skidmore says that there had been 550 executions in the first six months of 1959. In an April 1961 UPI story, the agency stated that about "700 have died before Castro's firing squads" between 1959 and 1961. The World Handbook of Political and Social Indicators ascertained that there had been 2,113 political executions between the years 1958–67, while British historian Hugh Thomas, stated in his study Cuba or the pursuit of freedom that "perhaps" 5,000 executions had taken place by 1970.

The vast majority of those executed directly following the 1959 revolution were policemen, politicians and informers for the Batista regime who were accused of crimes such as torture and murder, and their public trials and executions enjoyed widespread popular support among the Cuban population. Most scholars agree that those executed were most likely guilty as charged, but their trials did not follow due process. The Cuban Government justified such measures on the grounds that in Cuba, the application of capital punishment against war criminals and others followed the same procedure which had previously been followed by the Allies during the Nuremberg trials. Some Cuban scholars maintain that if the government had not imposed severe legislation against the torturers, terrorists, and other criminals who had been employed by the Batista regime, the people themselves would have taken justice into their own hands.

=== Forced labor camps and abuse of prisoners ===
In 1987, a "Tribunal on Cuba" was held in Paris in order to present testimonies by former prisoners of Cuba's penal system to the international media. The gathering was sponsored by Resistance International, a US-funded anti-communist group, and "The Coalition of Committees for the Rights of Man in Cuba". The testimonies which were presented at the tribunal, before an international panel, alleged that a pattern of torture existed in Cuba's prisons and "hard labor camps". The torture consisted of beatings, biological experiments which included dietary restrictions, violent interrogations and extremely unsanitary living conditions; periods of time when prisoners spent in hard labour camps without sufficient food, clothing or medical care; and the arrest of children who were over nine years old. The jury concurred with allegations of arbitrary arrest; sentencing, but there was no public audience or defender for the accused.

In 2005 a group of culture personalities signed an appeal on The Guardian in defense of Cuba, stating that "the government of the US has no moral authority to elect itself as the judge over human rights in Cuba, where there has not been a single case of disappearance, torture or extrajudicial execution since 1959, and where despite the economic blockade, there are levels of health, education and culture that are internationally recognised." The signatories include Rigoberta Menchú Tum, Adolfo Pérez Esquivel, José Saramago, Claudio Abbado, Manu Chao, Walter Salles, Nadine Gordimer, Harold Pinter, Tariq Ali, Harry Belafonte, Danny Glover, Ernesto Cardenal, Alice Walker, Ramsey Clark and Danielle Mitterrand.

=== Political abuse of psychiatry ===
Although Cuba has been politically connected to the Soviet Union since the United States broke off relations with Cuba shortly after its prime minister Fidel Castro came to power in 1959, few considerable allegations regarding the political abuse of psychiatry in that country emerged before the late 1980s. Americas Watch and Amnesty International published reports which alluded to cases of possible unwarranted hospitalization and ill-treatment of political prisoners. These reports concerned the Gustavo Machin hospital in Santiago de Cuba in the southeast of the country and the major mental hospital in Havana. In 1977, a report on the alleged abuse of psychiatry in Cuba was published in the United States and it presented cases of ill-treatment in Cuban mental hospitals which dated back to the early 1970s. It alleged that prisoners who end up in the forensic wards of mental hospitals in Santiago de Cuba and Havana are subjected to methods of ill-treatment which include electroconvulsive therapy without the use of muscle relaxants or anaesthesia. The reported application of ECT in the forensic wards seems, at least in many of the cited cases, not to be an adequate clinical treatment for the diagnosed state of the prisoner—in some cases the prisoners do not seem to have been diagnosed at all. Conditions in the forensic wards have been described in repulsive terms and they are apparently in striking contrast to the conditions in the other parts of the mental hospitals that are said to be well-kept and modern.

In August 1981, the Marxist historian Ariel Hidalgo was apprehended and accused of "incitement against the social order, international solidarity and the Socialist State" and sentenced to eight years' imprisonment. In September 1981, he was transported from State Security Headquarters to the Carbó-Serviá (forensic) ward of the Havana Psychiatric Hospital and stayed there for several weeks.

=== Black Spring ===
In March 2003, the government of Cuba arrested dozens of people (including self-identified journalists and human rights activists), and charged them with sedition due to their alleged cooperation with James Cason, head of the United States Interests Section in Havana. The accused were tried and sentenced to prison terms ranging from 15 to 28 years. In all, 75 people were given lengthy sentences averaging 17 years each. Among those sentenced were Raúl Rivero, Marta Beatriz Roque, and Oscar Elías Biscet. Amnesty International described the trials as "hasty and manifestly unfair."

Cuban Foreign Minister Felipe Pérez Roque denied these accusations and responded: "Cuba has the right to defend itself and apply punishment just like other nations do, like the United States punishes those who cooperate with a foreign power to inflict damage on their people and territory."

During the trial, evidence was presented that the defendants had received funds from the U.S. Interests Section. Cuban officials state that the goal of this funding was to undermine the Cuban state, disrupt internal order, and damage the Cuban economy. For his part, Cason denies offering funds to anyone in Cuba.

On November 29, 2004, the Cuban government released three of those arrested in March 2003: Oscar Espinosa Chepe, Marcelo López, and Margarito Broche. The action followed a meeting between the Spanish ambassador and Cuba's foreign minister. In subsequent days four more dissidents were released: Raúl Rivero, Osvaldo Alfonso Valdés, Edel José García and Jorge Olivera. Seven other prisoners had previously been released for health reasons.

== Contemporary Cuba ==
=== Political repression ===
A 2009 report by Human Rights Watch concluded that "Raúl Castro has kept Cuba's repressive machinery firmly in place...since being handed power by his brother Fidel Castro." The report found that "[s]cores of political prisoners arrested under Fidel continue to languish in prison, and Raúl has used draconian laws and sham trials to incarcerate scores more who have dared to exercise their fundamental rights."

US government-funded Freedom House classifies Cuba as being "Not Free", and notes that "Cuba is the only country in the Americas that consistently makes Freedom House's list of the Worst of the Worst: the World's Most Repressive Societies for widespread abuses of political rights and civil liberties." The 2017 World Report by Human Rights Watch writes that independent journalists who publish information considered critical of the government are subject to smear campaigns and arbitrary arrests, as are artists and academics who demand greater freedoms.

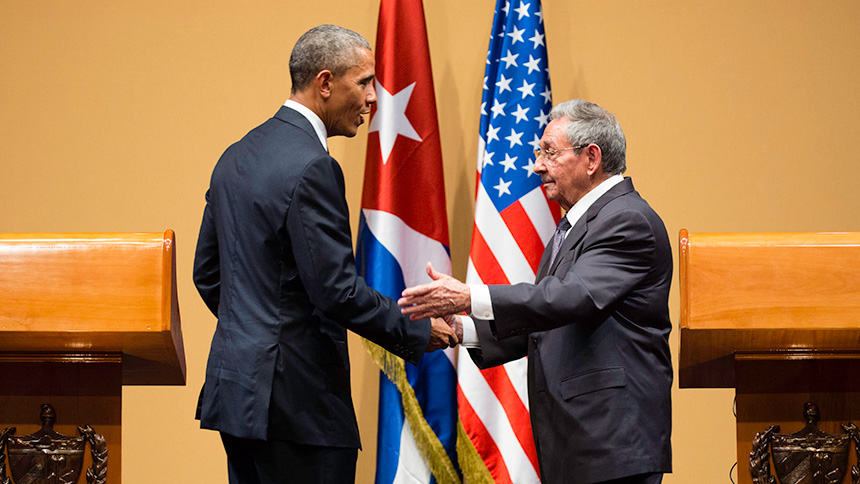
Jorge Luis García Pérez assailed the Cuban thaw as a capitulation to the Castro's regime

A 1999 Human Rights Watch report notes that the Interior Ministry's principal responsibility is to monitor the Cuban population for signs of dissent. In 1991 two new mechanisms for internal surveillance and control emerged. Communist Party leaders organized the Singular Systems of Vigilance and Protection (Sistema Unico de Vigilancia y Protección, SUVP). Rapid Action Brigades (Brigadas de Acción Rapida, also referred to as Rapid Response Brigades, or Brigadas de Respuesta Rápida) observe and control dissidents. The government also "maintains academic and labor files (expedientes escolares y laborales) for each citizen, in which officials record actions or statements that may bear on the person's loyalty to the revolution. Before advancing to a new school or position, the individual's record must first be deemed acceptable".

The opposition movement in Cuba is a widespread collection of individuals and nongovernmental organizations, most of whom are working for the respect of individual rights on the island. Some of the best known Cuban members of the opposition include the Ladies in White (recipients of the Sakharov Prize for Freedom of Thought), Human Rights Center and Cuban community leader Jesús Permuy, Marta Beatriz Roque, and Nobel Peace Prize nominee and Sakharov Prize winner Oswaldo Payá, as well as Óscar Elías Biscet, and Jorge Luis García Pérez "Antúnez."

On October 18, 2019, the U.S. Commerce Department announced that the United States will impose new sanctions against Cuba following its poor human rights records and its support of the Venezuelan government. In particular, José Daniel Ferrer's continued detention was brought into notice in a different statement which was issued by the U.S. State Department. Ferrer, who heads the Patriotic Union of Cuba (UNPACU), has been kept in detention by the Cuban government and his whereabouts have not been revealed.

=== Censorship ===
Cuba officially adopted the civil and political rights enumerated in the Universal Declaration of Human Rights in 1948. One of the key principles in the declaration was the insistence on Freedom of expression and opinion. According to the 1992 Cuban constitution, free speech was allowed "in keeping with the objectives of socialist society" and that artistic creation was allowed "as long as its content is not contrary to the Revolution". The 2019 Cuban constitution removed the language.

Cuba's ranking was on the bottom of the Press Freedom Index 2008 compiled by the Reporters Without Borders (RWB). Cuba was named one of the ten most censored countries in the world by the Committee to Protect Journalists.

According to American group Committee to Protect Journalists, the media in Cuba are operated under the supervision of the Communist Party's Department of Revolutionary Orientation, which "develops and coordinates propaganda strategies".

Human rights groups and international organizations believe that these articles subordinate the exercise of freedom of expression to the state. The Inter-American Commission on Human Rights assess that: "It is evident that the exercise of the right to freedom of expression under this article of the Constitution is governed by two fundamental determinants: on the one hand, the preservation and strengthening of the communist State; on the other, the need to muzzle any criticism of the group in power." Human rights group Amnesty International assert that the universal state ownership of the media means that freedom of expression is restricted. Thus the exercise of the right to freedom of expression is restricted by the lack of means of mass communication falling outside state control. Human Rights Watch states: "Refusing to recognize human rights monitoring as a legitimate activity, the government denies legal status to local human rights groups. Individuals who belong to these groups face systematic harassment, with the government putting up obstacles to impede them from documenting human rights conditions. In addition, international human rights groups such as Human Rights Watch and Amnesty International are barred from sending fact-finding missions to Cuba. It remains one of the few countries in the world to deny the International Committee of the Red Cross access to its prisons." Yet, activists' networks like Eye on Cuba and Cubalog.eu have continued working with the intention to raise awareness about the true situation concerning human and civil rights on the "island of freedom" and appeal to the European Union and its members to apply a responsible approach to Cuba in their foreign policy. Financial support and legal representation are provided by foreign NGOs as part of the EU Cuba Network.

A formal structure and system of reporting news not approved by the government was first attempted in 1993. The effort for an independent, uncensored news agency was spearheaded by Cuban human rights activist and then-President of Christian Democratic Movement Jesús Permuy. It formally began in May of that year as Members of Civic Democratic Action, an umbrella group of nearly twenty Castro opposition organizations, formed an alliance with the Independent Cuban Journalists Association. The effort ultimately failed.

A Reporters Without Borders report as of October 2006 finds that Internet use is very restricted and under tight surveillance. Access is only possible with government permission and equipment is rationed. E-mail is monitored.

Foreign journalists are systematically expelled from Cuba, e.g. notable journalists of Gazeta Wyborcza, Anna Bikont and Seweryn Blumsztahn, were expelled in 2005.

==== Acts of repudiation ====
Human rights groups including Amnesty International have long been critical of what the Cuban authorities have termed "Acts of repudiation" (actos de repudio). These acts occur when large groups of citizens verbally abuse, intimidate and sometimes physically assault and throw stones and other objects at the homes of Cubans who are considered counter-revolutionaries. Human rights groups suspect that these acts are often carried out in collusion with the security forces and sometimes involve the Committees for the Defence of the Revolution or the Rapid Response Brigades.

=== Restrictions on assembly ===
As of 2005, Human Rights Watch stated that "freedom of assembly is severely restricted in Cuba, and political dissidents are generally prohibited from meeting in large groups." In 2006, Amnesty stated that "All human rights, civil and professional associations and unions that exist today in Cuba outside the officialdom of the state apparatus and mass organizations controlled by the government are barred from having legal status. This often puts at risk the individuals who belong to these associations of facing harassment, intimidation or criminal charges for activities which constitute the legitimate exercise of the fundamental freedoms of expression, association and assembly."

The Cuban authorities only recognize a single national trade union centre, the Central de Trabajadores de Cuba (CTC). The government explicitly prohibits independent trade unions, there is systematic harassment and detention of labor activists, and the leaders of attempted independent unions have been imprisoned. The right to strike is not recognized in law.

=== Society ===
The Assembly to Promote Civil Society in Cuba is a coalition of 365 independent civil society groups with the stated aims of "forming a democratic culture", "developing a social movement", strengthening the Assembly's organization, communicating among groups to promote the civil society, using all available means to combat poverty and seeking the betterment of the community's life conditions, developing a true knowledge of Cuba's history, in all its dimensions: economic, social and political, undertaking activities and projects aimed at the protection and conservation of natural resources and the ecosystem, and promoting a true culture on labor rights. The Assembly had its first meeting in May 2005.

=== Capital punishment ===
Cuba placed a moratorium on the use of capital punishment in 1999. However, an exception was made when, in 2003, three members of a gang of ten were executed for a ferry hijacking. The hijackers were attempting to reach Florida, but ran out of fuel only halfway to their destination. After a two-day stand-off, the ferry was escorted by coast guard patrol boats back to a Cuban port, ostensibly to refuel; when hostages began jumping over the sides of the ship, however, the authorities subdued the hijackers and regained control. Four other men were given life sentences, and the remaining three women involved received 1–5 years in prison.

=== Notable prisoners of conscience ===
- In 1960, Armando Valladares was convicted on a charge of placing bombs in public places and was sentenced to thirty years in prison. He and his supporters contend that he was never part of the Batista police as alleged by Castro supporters, and that his imprisonment was the result of his vocal opposition to the Castro government. Valladares said he was tortured and humiliated while he was on a hunger strike in order to protest against prison abuses; he said the guards denied him water until he became delirious, and they proceeded to urinate in his mouth and on his face. He said he required the use of a wheelchair following his longest hunger strike. The Cuban government rejected the claims and provided video evidence to Regis Debray of Valladares standing and walking. Valladares was released from prison after serving twenty-two years of his sentence, due in part to the intercession of France's President François Mitterrand. Conservative author David Horowitz has since called Valladares a "Human Rights Hero."
- In 1973, gay writer Reinaldo Arenas was sent to prison after being charged and convicted of 'ideological deviation' and for publishing abroad to evade censorship in Cuba. He escaped from prison and tried to leave Cuba by launching himself from the shore on a tire inner tube. The attempt failed and he was re-arrested near Lenin Park and imprisoned at the notorious El Morro Castle alongside murderers and rapists. After finally escaping from Cuba in the 1980 Mariel Boatlift, Arenas described the horrors he endured under the Cuban government in his autobiography Antes que anochezca (1992), English translation Before Night Falls (1993).
- On August 28, 1998, a Havana court sentenced Reynaldo Alfaro García, a member of the Democratic Solidarity Party, to three years in prison for "spreading enemy propaganda" and "rumour-mongering".
- Desi Mendoza, a Cuban doctor, was imprisoned for making statements criticizing Cuba's response to an epidemic of dengue fever in Santiago de Cuba which he alleged had caused several deaths. Dr. Mendoza had previously been fired from his job in a Cuban hospital three years earlier for establishing an independent medical association. He was later released due to ill-health, subject to his leaving the country.
- Óscar Elías Biscet, a medical doctor, has been sentenced to prison for 25 years for his non-violent, but vocal opposition to Castro.
- In early 2003, dozens of persons, including independent journalists, librarians and other opponents of the Castro government were jailed after summary show trials, with some sentences in excess of 20 years, on the charge of receiving money from the United States in order to carry out anti-government activities.
- An Amnesty International report, CUBA: fundamental freedoms still under attack, calls for the "Cuban authorities to release all prisoners of conscience immediately and unconditionally" and to "revoke all legislation that restricts freedom of expression, assembly and association, and to put a halt to all actions to harass and intimidate dissidents, journalists, and human rights defenders".
- Jorge Luis García Pérez was reported to have been released from prison in April 2007 after serving his full sentence of 17 years and 34 days for having, at the age of 25, shouted slogans against Fidel Castro. García Antúnez was convicted of sabotage after authorities accused him of setting fire to sugar cane fields, sabotage, spreading "enemy propaganda", and being in illegal possession of a weapon.
- Dr. Ariel Ruiz Urquiola, whom Amnesty International had declared "a prisoner of conscience" and demanded that he be released "immediately and without conditions".
- On September 2, 2020, Article 19, Institute for War and Peace Reporting and Amnesty International urged the Cuban government to immediately release prisoner of conscience and independent journalist, Roberto Quiñones Haces. Following the trial in August 2019 and he was sentenced to one-year imprisonment for resistance and disobedience concerning his work as an independent journalist.

=== Travel and emigration ===
As of January 14, 2013, all Cuban government-imposed travel restrictions and controls have been abolished. Since that date, any Cuban citizen, with a valid passport, can leave the country subject to administrative restrictions imposed by the government. Students need the permission to travel from their school, workers from their employer. Both are controlled by the government. Visa requirements for Cuban citizens are more than the administrative entry restrictions by the authorities of other states placed on citizens of Cuba often incorporating (in violation of human rights) these requirement of proof of authorization to travel (Schengen countries EU). Some of the requirements of third countries like financial self sufficiency and financial ties to the country (property, income) can not be met by Cubans due to the site economic situation. Few Cubans have the (proven) income to show they can pay for travel and stay. Most need a sponsor. In 2014, Cuban citizens had visa-free or visa on arrival access to 61 countries and territories, ranking the Cuban passport 69th in the world. Persons holding dual Spanish and Cuban citizenships are now allowed to travel freely, using their Spanish passport in lieu of a visa for countries normally requiring a visa for the Cuban passport. Moreover, ever since that date, the Cuban government extended the allowable time abroad from 11 to 24 months, allowing Cubans who return within the 24-month time frame to retain their status and benefits of "Cuban Resident of the Interior". Should the citizen remain out of Cuba for more than 24 months, then his status would change to "Cuban Resident of the Exterior" and he would lose his privileges within. By this change, there is no longer such a thing as "illegal" or "unauthorized" travel, and therefore persons who leave Cuba via unconventional means (boats, etc.) are no longer violating Cuban law, and therefore are not subject to detention or imprisonment.

Prior to January 13, 2013, Cuban citizens could not travel abroad, leave or return to Cuba without first obtaining official permission along with applying for a government-issued passport and travel visa, which was often denied. Unauthorized travel abroad had sometimes resulted in criminal prosecution. It was common, in those days, that certain citizens who were authorized travel (primarily medical personnel and other professionals deemed essential to the country) were not permitted to take their children with them overseas. In the event that Cuban doctors defect to the United States when they are sent to a "mission" out of Cuba to any foreign country, any children left behind would not be allowed to join their defector parent for a minimum of ten years, even if they had received a foreign visa, and regardless of their age. Castro opposition leader Oswaldo Payá has been allowed to travel abroad to receive his Sakharov Prize, but Ladies in White was not.

From 1959 through 1993, some 1.2 million Cubans (about 10% of the current population) left the island for the United States, often by sea in small boats and fragile rafts. In the early years, a number of those who could claim dual Spanish-Cuban citizenship left for Spain. Over time a number of Cuban Jews were allowed to emigrate to Israel after quiet negotiations; the majority of the 10,000 or so Jews who were in Cuba in 1959 have left. Since the collapse of the Soviet Union, many Cubans now reside in a diverse number of countries, some ending up in countries of the European Union. A large number of Cubans live in Mexico and Canada.

At times the exodus was tolerated by the Cuban government as a "release valve"; at other times the government has impeded it. Some Cubans left for economic reasons and some for political ones. Others emigrated by way of the U.S. Naval Base at Guantanamo Bay, which is blocked on the Cuban (land) side by barbed-wired fences and land mines.

In 1995 the US government entered into an agreement with the Cuban government to resolve the emigration crisis that created the Mariel Boatlift of 1980, when Castro opened the docks to anyone who wanted to leave. The result of the negotiations was an agreement under which the United States was required to issue 20,000 visas annually to Cuban emigrants. This quota is rarely filled; the Bush administration refused to comply with the act, issuing only 505 visas to Cubans in the first six months of 2003. It also blocked some Cubans who have visas.

On July 13, 1994, 72 Cubans attempted to leave the Island on a World War II era tugboat named the 13 de Marzo. In an attempt by the Cuban Navy to stop the tugboat, patrol boats were sent out to intercept the tug. Crewmen and survivors reported that the Cuban interception vessels rammed the tugboat and sprayed its passengers with high-pressure fire hoses, sweeping many overboard.

The US Coast Guard reported that the interceptions in high seas have been characterized as violent confrontations with authorities and by the deaths of immigrants. According to the same authorities, the Cubans are taken to the US on speedboats by a network of criminals specialized in human trafficking, former drug traffickers, based in southern Florida, who now find contraband of humans more lucrative than drugs. These criminals charge 8 to 12 thousand dollars per person, overcrowding the small vessels. The majority of those that attempt to emigrate are individuals that have relatives in the United States, others who do not qualify to be considered as legal immigrants in the US, or those who do not want to wait their turn in the annual quota, assigned under the migratory treaties for legal immigrants

Since November 1966, the Cuban Adjustment Act provides automatic permanent residency for almost all Cubans arriving legally or illegally after one year and one day in the US. No immigrant from any other nation has this privilege. Controversy over this policy centers around the loss of Cuba's scientists, professionals, technicians and other skilled individuals, but it has also prompted concerns of a migratory crisis.

At the end of the 2005 fiscal year which ended September 30, the US Coast Guard Service reported having intercepted 2,712 Cubans at sea, more than double the 1,225 reported in 2004 The figure for 2005 is the third highest of Cubans intercepted in the Florida Straits during the last 12 years. The highest had been reported in 1993 with 3,656 and 1994 when over 30,000 Cubans emigrated illegally due to the so-called migratory crisis between the two countries.

The 1994 and 1995 migratory accords signed between Havana and Washington, and which emerged due to the crisis in August 1994, are still in effect. These accords force the US to return all those intercepted at sea by US authorities to Cuba, except the cases in which political persecution can be proven to justify exile in the United States.

The accords were designed to discourage those who would consider emigrating illegally by sea but the Bush administration has not complied with Washington's part of the agreements. Although the Coast Guard says that only 2.5 percent of the Cubans intercepted are granted political asylum, the public understanding, the public perception in Cuba and among the Cuban community in Miami, is not the same. And since that is not the perception, more and more people continue to illegally leave the island by sea causing fatal consequences. According to studies carried out by Cuban experts on the island, it is estimated that at least 15 percent of those that attempt to cross the sea die before reaching the US.

However, figures of those fleeing other Latin American or Caribbean countries of origin compare similarly with those of Cuba. During the 2005 fiscal year, 3,612 Dominicans were picked up at high seas attempting to illegally reach the US (900 more than Cubans intercepted), and in 2004, 3,229 Haitians were also picked up (2,000 more than the 1,225 Cubans that fiscal year). The Brazilian daily O Globo published an article on illegal immigrants in the US, quoting official sources, pointing out that during the first semester of 2005, 27,396 Brazilians were stopped from illegally crossing US borders, an average of 4,556 per month and 152 a day. In 2004, a total of 1,160,000 foreigners, were stopped when attempting to illegally enter the US, 93 percent of them (close to 1,080,000) were Mexicans.

=== Education ===
Education in Cuba is free at all levels and led by the Ministry for Education. In 1961 the government nationalized all private educational institutions and introduced a state-directed education system.

Amnesty International's 2017-2018 Annual Report reported that advances in education were undermined by ongoing online and offline censorship. Cuba remained mostly closed to independent human rights monitors.

=== Healthcare ===
The Cuban government operates on a national health system and assumes full fiscal and administrative responsibility for the health care of its citizens. The government prohibits any private alternatives to the national health system. In 1976, Cuba's healthcare program was enshrined in Article 50 of the revised constitution which states, "Everyone has the right to health protection and care". Healthcare in Cuba is also free, although challenges include low salaries for doctors, poor facilities, poor provision of equipment, and the frequent absence of essential drugs.

However, there is no right to privacy, or a patient's informed consent, or the right to protest or sue a doctor or clinic for malpractice. Many Cubans complain about politics in medical treatment and health care decision-making.

After spending nine months in Cuban clinics, anthropologist Katherine Hirschfeld wrote: "My increased awareness of Cuba's criminalization of dissent raised a very provocative question: to what extent is the favorable international image of the Cuban health care system maintained by the state's practice of suppressing dissent and covertly intimidating or imprisoning would-be critics?"

Family doctors are expected to keep records of their patients' "political integration." Epidemiological surveillance has become juxtaposed with political surveillance.

=== Religious freedom ===
According to Human Rights Watch, even though Cuba, officially atheist until 1992, now "permits greater opportunities for religious expression than it did in past years, and has allowed several religious-run humanitarian groups to operate, the government still maintains tight control on religious institutions, affiliated groups, and individual believers". Censorship in Cuba has also been at the center of complaints.

In the years following the Cuban Revolution, the activities of the Roman Catholic Church were severely limited and in 1961 all property held by religious organizations was confiscated without compensation. Hundreds of members of the clergy, including a bishop, were permanently expelled from the nation. The Cuban leadership was officially atheist until 1992 when the Communist Party agreed to allow religious followers to join the party. In 1998, Pope John Paul II visited the island and was allowed to conduct large outdoor masses and visas were issued for nineteen foreign priests taking up residence in the country. In addition, other religious groups in Cuba such as the Jewish community are now permitted to hold public services and to import religious materials and kosher food for Passover, as well as to receive rabbis and other religious visitors from abroad. In October 2008, Cuba marked the opening of a Russian Orthodox Cathedral in Havana in a ceremony attended by Raúl Castro, Vice President Esteban Lazo, Parliament leader Ricardo Alarcón, and other figures. The Cuban press noted that the cathedral was the first of its kind in Latin America.

According to the report of Human Rights Watch from 2017 the government continues to rely on arbitrary detention to harass and intimidate critics, independent activists, political opponents, and others. This report added that the Cuban Commission for Human Rights and National Reconciliation, an independent human rights group that lacks official authorization and is therefore considered illegal by the government, received more than 7,900 reports of arbitrary detentions from January through August 2016. This represents the highest monthly average of detentions in the past six years.

In 2022, Freedom House rated Cuba's religious freedom as 3 out of 4, noting that religious freedom has improved over the past decade.

A 2023 report found that documented Freedom of Religion violations more than doubled from 272 in 2021 to 657 in 2022.

=== Gender equality ===
Cuba is a regional front-runner in women's rights. With respect to reproductive rights, Cuban women have up to two years of maternity leave and free access to abortion.

Women head almost 50% of households in Cuba. Sixty percent of Cuban professionals are women. Cuban women also have high representation in the country, with women holding 48.9% of the parliamentary seats in the Cuban National Assembly.

=== Racism ===
Esteban Morales Dominguez has pointed to institutionalized racism in his book The Challenges of the Racial Problem in Cuba (Fundación Fernando Ortiz). Racial Politics in Post-Revolutionary Cuba discusses the racial politics prevalent in communist Cuba.

Enrique Patterson, writing in the Miami Herald, describes race as a "social bomb" and he says, "If the Cuban government were to permit black Cubans to organize and raise their problems before [authorities] ... totalitarianism would fall". Carlos Moore, who has authored extensively on the issue, says that "There is an unstated threat, blacks in Cuba know that whenever you raise race in Cuba, you go to jail. Therefore, the struggle in Cuba is different. There cannot be a civil rights movement. You will have instantly 10,000 black people dead". He says that a new generation of black Cubans are looking at politics in another way.

Jorge Luis García Pérez, a well-known Afro-Cuban human rights and democracy activist who was imprisoned for 17 years, in an interview with the Florida-based Directorio Democrático Cubano states "The authorities in my country have never tolerated that a black person oppose the revolution. During the trial, the color of my skin aggravated the situation. Later when I was mistreated in prison by guards, they always referred to me as being black".

Despite these barriers however, Cuba has oftentimes been praised for advances of the Cuban Revolution in the areas of racial equality. During his leadership, Castro abolished segregation in businesses and public spaces while also ushering in egalitarian reforms in areas such as employment, wages, social security, and education. The proportion of high school graduates was actually higher among blacks than among whites in Cuba, whereas the opposite was true in both Brazil and the United States. In the area of life expectancy, The life expectancy of nonwhite Cubans was only one year lower than that of whites; life expectancy was basically identical for all racial groups. A powerful indicator of social wellbeing, linked to access to health services (as reflected, particularly, in infant mortality), nutrition and education, the Cuban race gap in life expectancy was significantly lower than those found in more affluent multiracial societies such as Brazil (about 6.7 years) and the United States (about 6.3 years) during the same period. Because of these social reforms the Afro Cuban population is the healthiest longest living black population in the world. In the area of national leadership the vestiges of the pre revolutionary era are still visible when it comes to the question of colour, with Afro Cubans having yet to achieve parity when it comes to representation. Nevertheless, reforms have been introduced since in the 1970s when Castro "worked to increase the number of Afro-Cuban political representatives, with the percentage of Black members on the Council of State expanding from 12.9% in 1976 to 25.8% by 2003".

=== LGBT rights in Cuba ===
The rights of lesbian, gay, bisexual, and transgender people in Cuba have evolved significantly over time, from widespread discrimination in most of the 20th century to what are now considered some of the most progressive LGBT policies in Latin America.

==== Discrimination ====
Thousands of homosexuals, Jehovah's Witnesses, conscientious objectors, and dissidents were forced to conduct their compulsory military service in the 1960s at UMAP camps, where they were subject to political "reeducation". Military commanders brutalized the inmates. Carlos Alberto Montaner says "Camps of forced labour were instituted with all speed to "correct" such deviations ... Verbal and physical mistreatment, shaved heads, work from dawn to dusk, hammocks, dirt floors, scarce food ... The camps became increasingly crowded as the methods of arrest became more expedient".

In the late 1960s, because of "revolutionary social hygiene", the Castro government claimed to cleanse the arts of "fraudulent sodomitic" writers and "sick effeminate" dancers. Additionally, men with long hair were locked up and their hair was cut.

Castro is reported to once have asserted that, "in the country[side], there are no homosexuals". He stated in 1992 that homosexuality is a "natural human tendency that must simply be respected". Another source reports Castro as having denounced "maricones" ("faggots") as "agents of imperialism". Castro had also reportedly said that "homosexuals should not be allowed in positions where they are able to exert influence upon young people".

==== 21st century reforms ====
Cuba has made reforms in the 21st century, particularly via the successful 2022 Family Code referendum.

In 2003, Carlos Sanchez of the International Lesbian and Gay Association issued a report on the status of gay people in Cuba which stated that the Cuban government no longer imposes any legal punishments on its gay citizens, that there is a greater level of tolerance among Cubans for gay, bisexual, and transgender people, and that the Cuban government was open to endorsing a gay and lesbian rights plank at the United Nations. Since 2005 sex reassignment surgeries for transgender individuals are free under law, and are paid for by the government. Additionally, Havana now has a "lively and vibrant" gay and lesbian scene.

In a 2010 interview with Mexican newspaper La Jornada, Fidel Castro, called the persecution of homosexuals whilst he was in power "a great injustice, great injustice!" Taking responsibility for the persecution, he said, "If anyone is responsible, it's me ... We had so many and such terrible problems, problems of life or death. In those moments I was not able to deal with that matter [of homosexuals]. I found myself immersed, principally, in the Crisis of October, in the war, in policy questions." Castro personally believed that the negative treatment of gays in Cuba arose out of the country's pre-revolutionary attitudes toward homosexuality.

Mariela Castro, daughter of Communist Party First Secretary Raúl Castro, has been pushing for lesbian rights with the pro-lesbian government sponsored Cuban National Center for Sex Education which she leads. Mariela has stated her father fully supports her initiatives, saying that her father has overcome his initial homophobia to support his daughter.

The passage of the 2022 Family Code referendum legalized same-sex marriage and adoption by same-sex parents. Cuba now has one of the most progressive stances on LGBT rights of among Latin American countries.

== United Nations Human Rights Commission ==
Cuban human rights have been repeatedly discussed and debated in the United Nations Human Rights Commission since the Cuban Revolution. It would become a recurring flashpoint in the backdrop of international dynamic during the Cold War and into the years following.

The organized and sustained international effort launched by prominent Cuban dissident groups (e.g. Miami's Center for Human Rights, UNIDAD Cubana, Christian Democratic Party of Cuba, and others) and affiliated NGOs (such as Human Rights Watch) made their way to the UNHRC and would become a growing presence in Geneva. These groups sometimes represented a spectrum of different Cuban interests, such as religious liberty (e.g. Christian-Democrat movements, parties, and organizations) and education (e.g. the International Association of Educators for World Peace), that coalesced around the issue of human rights. An influential force credited with crafting and spearheading the international Cuban human rights effort, particularly in the United Nations, was activist and Cuban community leader Jesús Permuy. The Miami Herald's profile of the Cuban Christian Democrat Movement stated that Permuy spearheaded the international diplomatic strategy to call out the Castro regime's human rights abuses and work with other Christian-Democratic governments to withhold international support until governmental changes were made to address human rights abuses. Though the coalition's NGO-driven human rights effort for Cuba initially struggled to gain traction in the UNHRC, their influence gradually grew, especially as key groups secured Consultative Status which significantly expanded their resources and exposure there. A significant turning point in these efforts came in 1984 when Permuy's Miami-based Center for Human Rights successfully lobbied to have Cuba's diplomatic representative, Luis Sola Vila, removed from a key subcommittee of the United Nations Human Rights Commission and replaced with a representative from Ireland, a Christian-Democratic ally in opposition of the Castro government. Another key moment came in 1987 when US President Ronald Reagan appointed Armando Valladares, former Cuban political prisoner of 22 years, as the US ambassador to the commission. By 1992, there had been a substantial change in Geneva as the UNHRC representatives had shifted from initial rejection, then indifference and towards embrace of the anti-Castro Cuban human rights movement's diplomatic efforts.

Since 1990, the United States itself has presented various resolutions to the annual UN Human Rights Commission criticizing Cuba's human rights record. The proposals and subsequent diplomatic disagreements have been described as a "nearly annual ritual". Long-term consensus between Latin American nations has not emerged. The resolutions were passed 1990–1997, but were rejected in 1998. Subsequent efforts by the U.S. have succeeded by narrow voting margins. In the Americas, some governments back the criticism, others oppose it, seeing it as a cynical manipulation of a serious human rights issue in order to promote the isolation of the island and to justify the decades-old embargo. European Union nations have universally voted against Cuba since 1990, though requests that the resolution should contain references to the negative effects of the economic embargo have been made.

== Cuban human rights groups ==
- Cuban Democratic Directorate (Directorio)
- Foundation for Human Rights in Cuba
- International Committee for Democracy in Cuba
- Cuban Liberty Council
- Cuban dissidents
- Ladies in White
- Cuban Observatory of Human Rights

== See also ==
- Disability in Cuba
- Guantanamo Bay detention camp
- Sebastian Arcos Bergnes
- Darsi Ferrer Ramírez
- Cuban political prisoners hunger strike of 2010
