= Darsi Ferrer Ramírez =

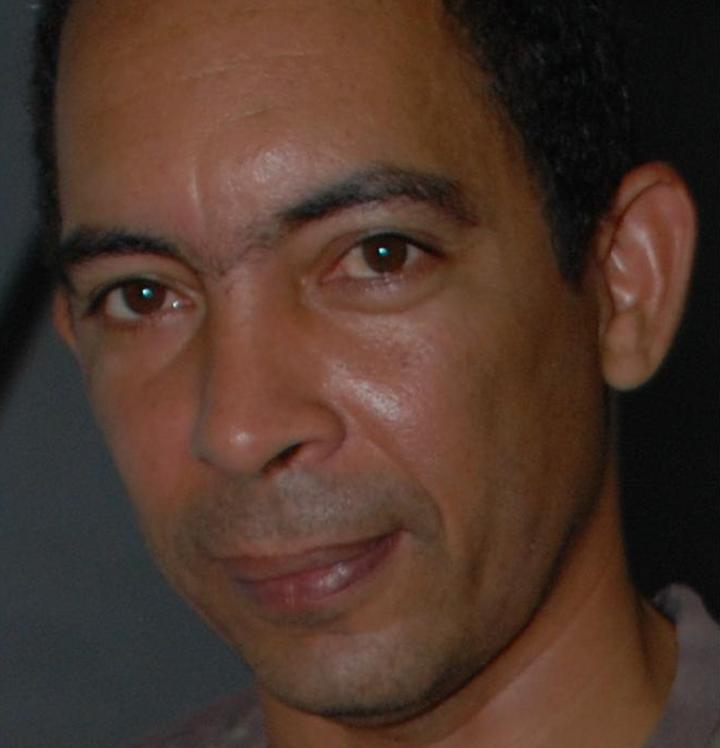
- Darsi Ferrer Ramírez
- Born: November 2, 1969 (age 56)
- Died: October 6, 2017 (aged 47)
- Occupations: Doctor, journalist, director of Juan Bruno Zayas Health and Human Rights Center, and dissident
- Known for: Organized protests at the UNESCO headquarters in Havana
- Medical career
- Awards: State Department Freedom Defenders Award, Honorable Mention

Darsi Ferrer Ramírez (2 November 1969 – 6 October 2017) was a Cuban doctor, journalist, director of Juan Bruno Zayas Health and Human Rights Center, and also a dissident.

He organized protests at the UNESCO headquarters in Havana and published about poverty in Cuba. He was arrested and went on a hunger strike. Ferrer was facing up to 8 years in prison. He was released on 22 June 2010.

On 26 February 2010, Amnesty International adopted Ferrer Ramírez as a prisoner of conscience in Cuba and urged President Raúl Castro for his immediate and unconditional release.

On 23 March 2010, Ferrer Ramírez was the recipient of the 2009 State Department Freedom Defenders Award, Honorable Mention. This award recognized Ferrer's work and bravery in the defense of human rights in Cuba.

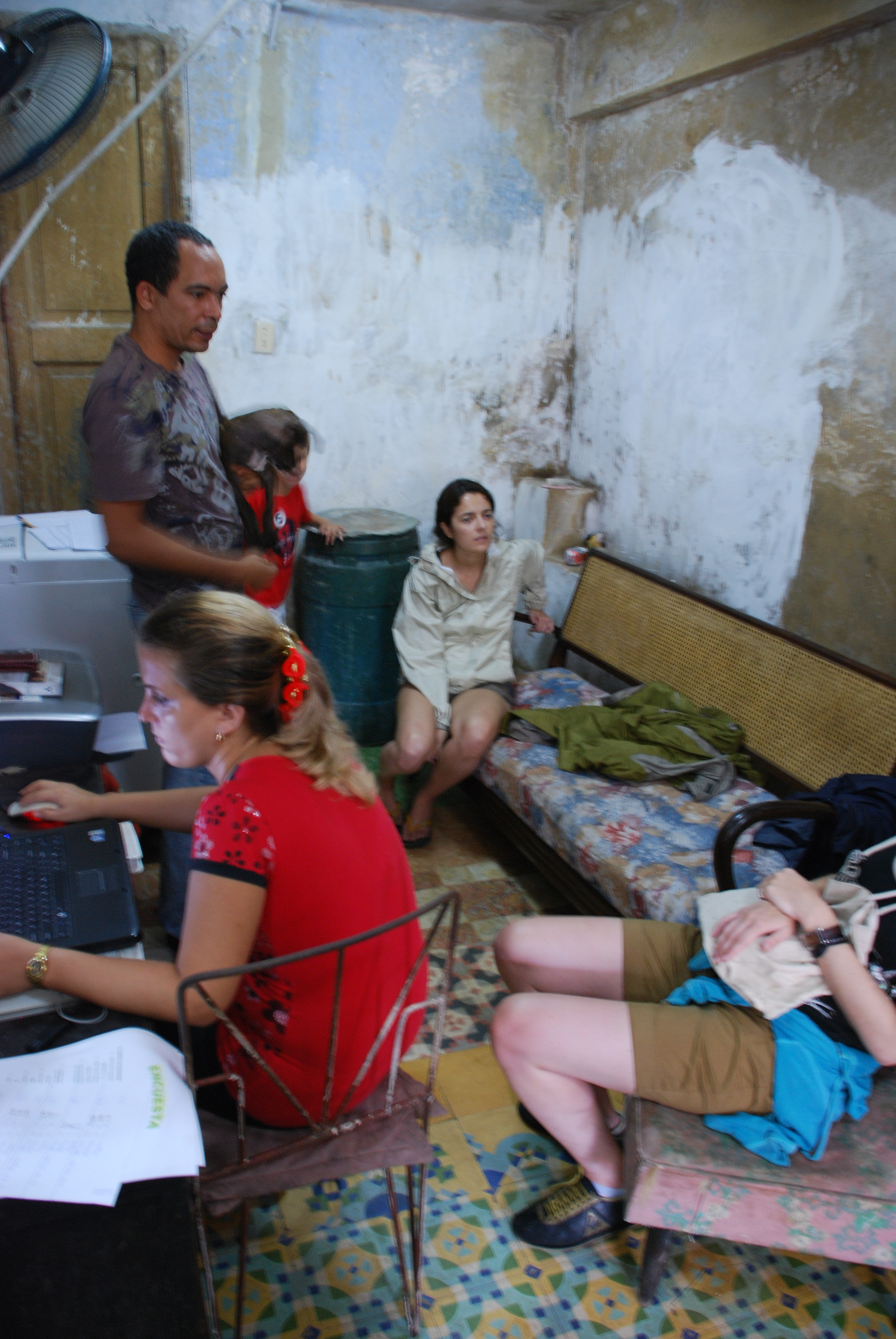
Darsi Ferrer at home. Havana, November 2008

== See also ==
- Human rights in Cuba
- Politics of Cuba
- Opposition to Fidel Castro
