= Cuban Democratic Directorate =

The Cuban Democratic Directorate (Directorio Democrático Cubano) is a nongovernmental organization that supports the human rights movement in Cuba. The organisation is heavily financed by the United States government through the National Endowment for Democracy program, receiving $650,000 in 2022.

The Directorio supports freedom, democracy and human rights in Cuba by way of nonviolent civic struggle. Based in the United States, they aid Cuban opposition organizations by providing humanitarian and material support, and connecting foreign journalists with sources in Cuba, and building international solidarity for the opposition movement in Cuba. The Directorio is a signatory of the Agreement for Democracy in Cuba. Originally drafted in 1998 ahead of Pope John Paul II's trip to Cuba, the 10-point document calls for, among other things, free elections on the island and the release of political prisoners. More than 120 organizations, both in Cuba and abroad, have signed it. The Directorio is a member of the Christian Democrat Organization of America and an associate member of the International Democrat Union.

== History ==
Founded in 1990 at the International Congress of Cuban Youth for a Free Cuba in Miami Beach, the Directorio began primarily as an organization of students and professionals in their 20s and 30s who wanted to contribute to the fall of the socialist government on the island.

The group took the name Directorio Revolucionario Democrático Cubano (Cuban Democratic Revolutionary Directorate) in honor of the tradition begun in the late 1920s in Havana whereby university students began forming "directorates" to defend citizens' basic liberties and rights from supposed government violations. In March 2002, members chose to change the name to Directorio Democrático Cubano (Cuban Democratic Directorate) to better reflect the primacy of democratic values in the organization's vision and goals since its founding.

== Activities ==
=== International ===
The Directorio actively represents the interests of the Cuban opposition movement before international human rights organizations and foreign governments. The Directorio frequently participates in conferences and programs organized by Václav Havel's International Committee for Democracy in Cuba. They also support human rights activists by publicizing their work and activities through the Steps to Freedom reports, news updates on their websites, as well as publishing books by activists such as student leader Nestor Rodriguez Lobaina's "Con el Alma Cautiva" (With a Captive Soul).

=== Steps to Freedom Report ===
The Directorio publishes an annual report on the Cuban democracy movement called "Steps to Freedom" which analyzes the movement's civic resistance actions according to a framework drawn from the work of Gene Sharp. To date, it is the only attempt at a systematic study on the Island's growing civil society.

Its findings have been featured in the peer-reviewed Journal of Interdisciplinary Studies and in National Review magazine. According to Steps to Freedom, civic resistance actions in Cuba have increased every year from 1998 to 2004.

=== Radio Republica ===
The Directorio also operates Radio Republica, a radio station that transmits programming 7 days a week via shortwave and AM signals to Cuba. Its programming is focused on internal Cuban social dynamics and features extensive coverage of the opposition movement, international news relating to Cuba, and social issues on the island.

=== Non-Cooperation Campaign ===
The Directorio has been one of the exile organizations most active in supporting the "Yo No Coopero con la Dictadura" (I Do Not Cooperate with the Dictatorship) campaign launched by political prisoners Jorge Luis Garcia Perez Antunez and Jose Daniel Ferrer Garcia in 2005. Activists in Cuba carry out street protests, processions, and fasts as part of this initiative. In 2007, Directorio supported an effort to boycott elections in Cuba called "No a la Farsa Electoral" (No to the Electoral Farce).

=== Human Rights ===
The Directorio helps inform international human rights organizations like Amnesty International and instruments like the Inter-American Commission on Human Rights about human rights violations in Cuba by relaying reports from activists there.

== Funding ==
The DDC receives funding from the National Endowment for Democracy (NED) from funds earmarked for regime change in Cuba. The NED funds also went toward the Directorio’s radio station.
