= Yo No Coopero Con La Dictadura =

Cuban civil disobedience campaign

Yo No Coopero Con La Dictadura campaign logos.

Yo No Coopero Con La Dictadura (English: I Do Not Cooperate with the Dictatorship) is a civil disobedience campaign by Cuban political opposition.

The campaign was launched by political prisoners Juan Carlos Herrera Acosta Jorge Luis García Pérez and Jose Daniel Ferrer in 2005. Activists in Cuba carry out street protests, processions, and fasts as part of this initiative. In 2007, the American political group Cuban Democratic Directorate supported an effort to boycott elections in Cuba called "No a la Farsa Electoral" (No to the Electoral Farce).

The campaign, utilizes the slogan "I do want change", and is articulated in six fundamental points: "I do not repudiate, I do not assist, I do not snitch, I do not follow, I do not cooperate, and I do not repress." Furthermore, as a symbolic gesture of non-cooperation with the Cuban regime, members of the organization cross their arms over their chests.

Multiple Cuban-American artists, such as Lissette Álvarez, Willy Chirino, Jon Secada, Paquito D'Rivera, Boncó Quiñongo, and Amaury Gutiérrez have declared their support for the campaign.

== See also ==
- Non-cooperation movement
