= International Committee for Democracy in Cuba =

The International Committee for Democracy in Cuba (ICDC) was created in September 2003 as "a response to the latest brutal crackdown by the Cuban government in the spring of that year against those pushing for democratic reforms, freedom of speech and adherence to international human rights agreements".

The ICDC includes prominent international political figures, diplomats and intellectuals from around the world who want to show political solidarity with fellow democracy activists in Cuba and channel economic support to Cuba's democratic opposition.

On 17–19 September 2004 the group held a conference of former heads of state, current ministers and representatives from the European Union and Latin America, leaders from international and regional organizations, intellectuals, academics, human rights activists, members of non governmental organizations, and representatives of the Cuban opposition.

The group is based in Prague and headed by Czech playwright, writer and ex-President Václav Havel was a member of Charter 77.

== See also ==
- Politics of Cuba
- Cuba and democracy
- Foreign relations of Cuba
- Opposition to Fidel Castro
- Human rights in Cuba
- Black Spring (Cuba)
