= National Revolutionary Police Force =

Law enforcement agency in Cuba

National Revolutionary Police Force Policía Nacional Revolucionaria
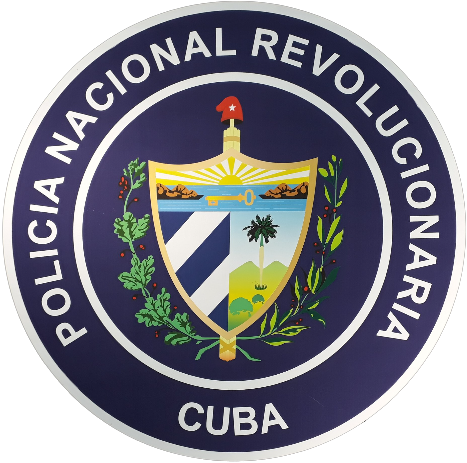
- Abbreviation: PNR

Agency overview
- Formed: 1959

Jurisdictional structure
- Operations jurisdiction: Cuba
- Governing body: Constitution of Cuba
- General nature: Local civilian police

Operational structure
- Headquarters: Havana
- Parent agency: Ministry of the Interior; Committees for the Defense of the Revolution

The National Revolutionary Police Force (Spanish: Policía Nacional Revolucionaria, PNR) is law enforcement agency of Cuba, under the administration of the Cuban Ministry of the Interior. Article 65 of the Constitution of Cuba states that "defense of the socialist motherland is every Cuban's greatest honor and highest duty". Conscription into either the military or the national police force is compulsory for those over the age of 16. Conscripts have no choice to which service they are assigned.

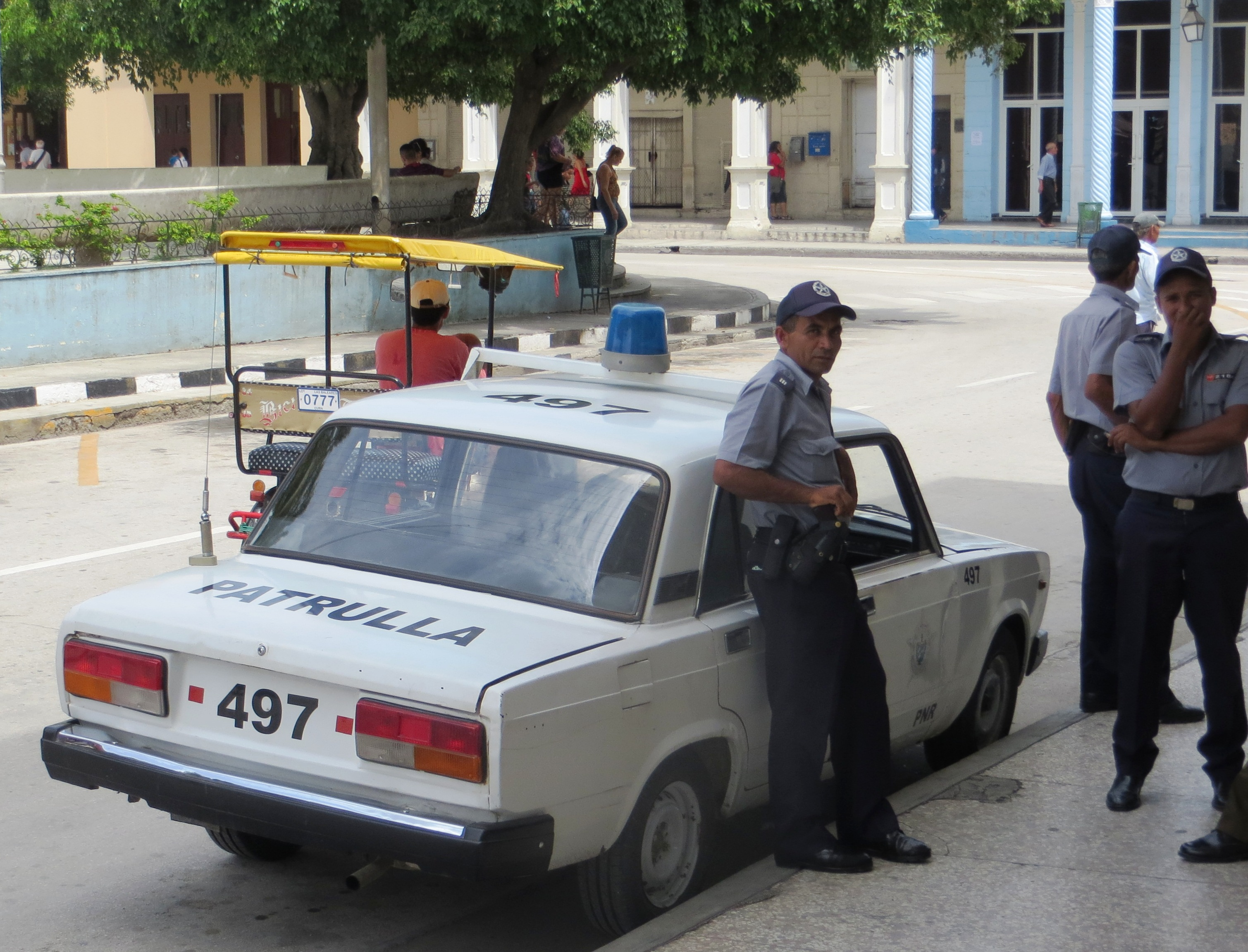
PNR officers and a Lada 2105 police car.

Fidel Castro commented in 1998 that "the war against crime is also a war against the imperialist enemy". Information on murder and rape crime statistics for Cuba have never been released by the government, but theft was estimated to be 6,531 cases in 1988, or 62 per 100,000 population.

== Prisons ==
The Cuban penal system contained 90,000 inmates as of January 2020, approximately 794 per 100,000. This figure does not include other detainees held in labor camps. Cuban detention facilities face issues with sanitation. This is due to water shortages in Cuba, which results in detainees facing restrictions on the use of water, such as for toilets and showers. Detainees are given a towel, two bars of soap, and a tube of toothpaste at the start of the month, which they must make last until the end of the month.

List of known prisons in Cuba:

- Combinado del Este Men's Prison
- Western Prison for Women
- Canaleta prison
- Villa Marista

== Administration of the PNR ==
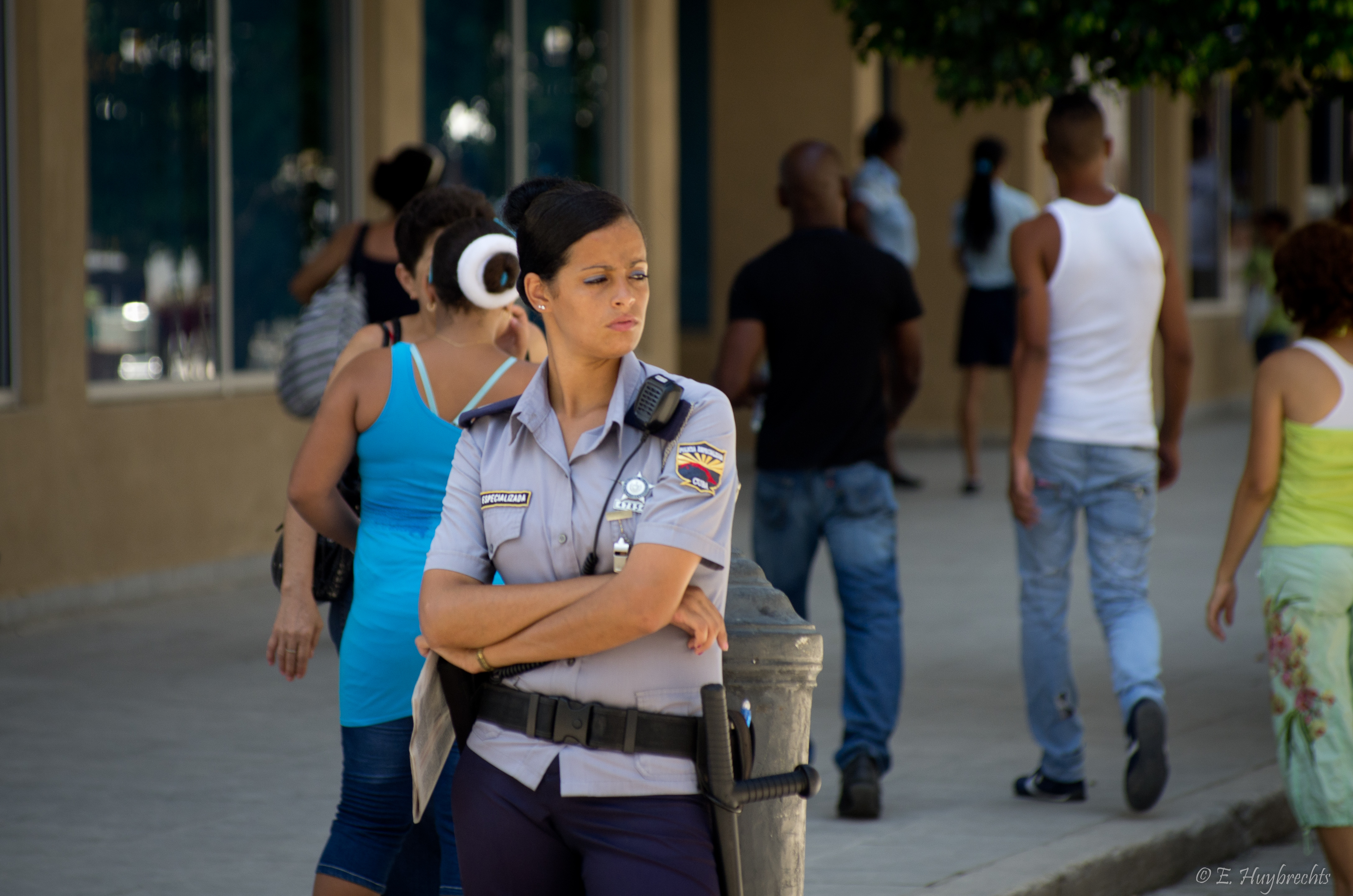
A PNR officer in Havana.

The PNR is under the control of the Ministry of the Interior, which reports to the Council of State. The Ministry of the Interior is divided into three divisions: Security, Technical Operations, and Internal Order and Crime Prevention. The Internal Order and Crime Prevention is divided into corrections, fire protection, and policing.

The PNR reports to this subdirectorate, and is responsible for uniform policing, criminal investigation, crime prevention, juvenile delinquency, and traffic control. The PNR conducts these activities across the 14 provinces of Cuba. Each province has its own police chief who reports to a central PNR command in Havana.

The Security division of the Ministry of the Interior is responsible for crimes such as espionage, sabotage and offenses against state security. All these divisions of the Ministry of the Interior and the PNR have been closely associated with the Cuban Revolutionary Armed Forces since 1959, thus the police use a Russian policing model with military ranks.

The PNR is supported by the Committees for the Defense of the Revolution (CDR), a police intelligence auxiliary police organization using la guardia, a nightly neighborhood watch. The CDR also handle issues relating to water and energy conservation, pet inoculation, and public health.

== Equipment ==
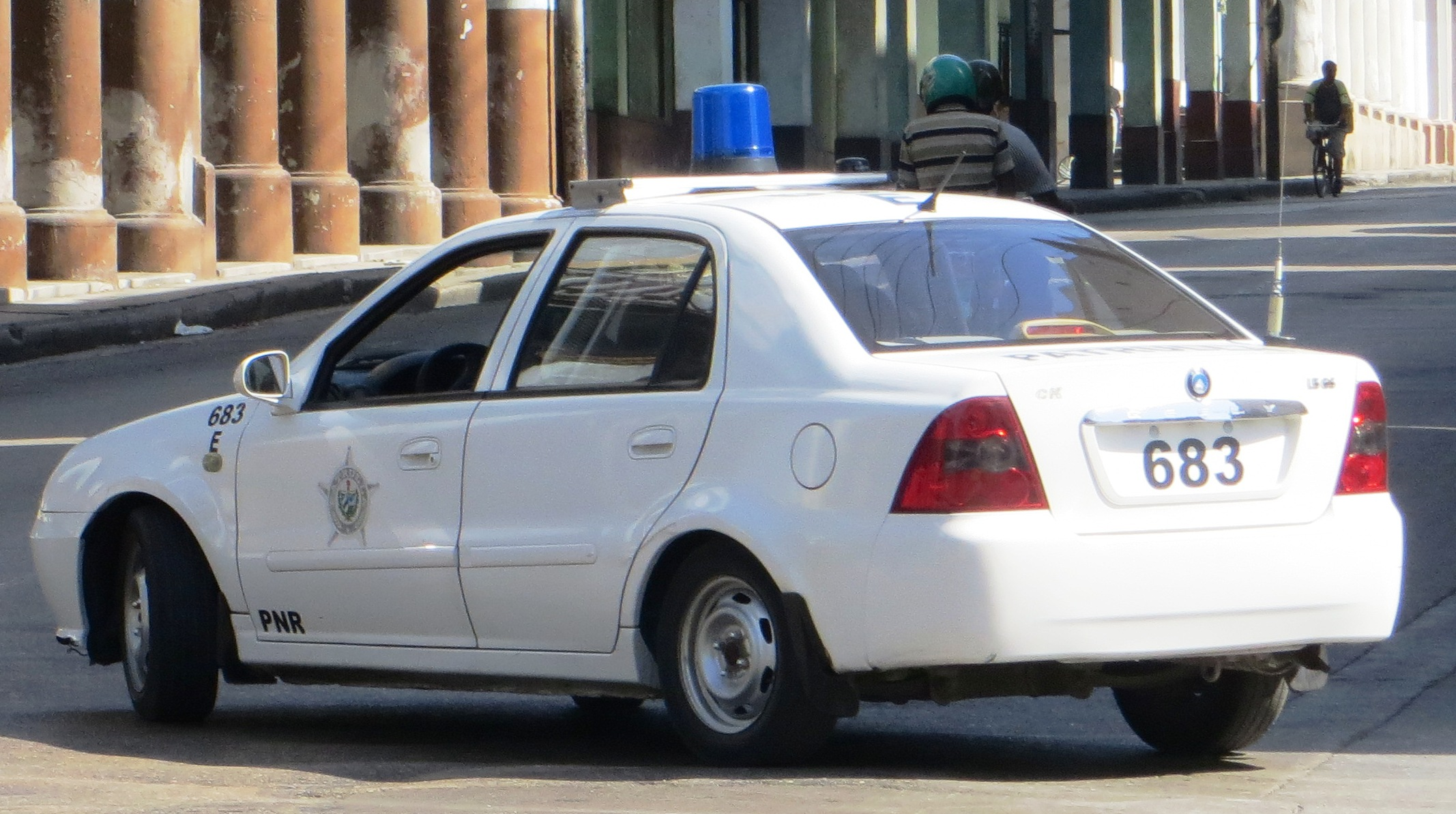
A Geely CK police car of the PNR.

The PNR have a wide range of police cars, the most common being the Soviet-made Lada 2107 and the Chinese-made Geely CK. The Geely was introduced in 2009 to replace the older Soviet cars. Hyundai and new Lada Vestas were put into service in recent years. There are also a number of French-made Peugeot and Citroen cruisers, introduced in the late 1990s and early 2000s, but these are still vastly outnumbered by the Lada 2107s, which are ubiquitous throughout Cuba.

The PNR has utilised radio communications and a computer dispatching system since the 1990s, made possible by the increased investment in the PNR to cope with rising crime during the economic crisis after the fall of the Soviet Union. PNR officers are armed with a semi-automatic handgun, usually a Makarov PM or CZ-75, and a baton. They "may use necessary force to apprehend suspects and to defend their person or that of any other citizen". They are not issued any other type of weapon.

== U.S. sanctions ==
In July 2021, the PNR, as an entity, its director, Oscar Callejas Valcarce, and its Deputy Director, Eddy Sierra Arias, were added by the U.S. Department of the Treasury to its Specially Designated Nationals (SDN) list for the "violent repression of protestors in Cuba" during the July protests.
