= Lawton Foundation =

Cuban human rights organization (1997-)

The Lawton Foundation was founded in 1997 in Havana, Cuba, as a non-governmental organization to promote the "study, defense and denunciation of human rights inside Cuba". The group was formed by Christian anti-abortion activist Oscar Elías Biscet González. Its members are adult Cuban citizens from a range of ages and social groups, including both professionals and non-professionals. The group states that it has been censured, harassed, mistreated and incarcerated by the Cuban authorities. The Lawton Foundation has a branch in the United States and other branches internationally.

== Goals ==
The purpose and objectives are:

1. "We demand the unconditional freedom of the people of Cuba under a multiparty system of government democratically elected at all levels and with complete guarantee of freedom of expression for all, including the government's detachment from the country’s media.
2. The repeal of the illegitimate communist constitution of 1976 and the establishment of a Sovereign Constitutional Assembly to draw amendments to the Democratic Constitution of 1940, including the absolute adhesion to the Universal Declaration of Human Rights of the United Nations and the abolition of the death penalty. These amendments should be ratified by the elected representatives.
3. The establishment of a state based on the rule of law that will guarantee equality to all citizens before the law, without discrimination based on race, sex, ethnic group, or religious beliefs and which will end the system of oppression and apartheid established under the communist regime.
4. The dissolution of all political, propagandistic, and repressive organizations created by the communist regime since January, 1959, with a renewed emphasis on the development of independent civic institutions that will forge democracy for the new society.
5. Unconditional and immediate amnesty for all political prisoners.
6. Free access to Cubans and their children, who live outside the country, to enter and cave the country at will, and enjoy the same citizenship rights as those who live inside the Country.
7. The commitment to fund a first-rate free educational system, without political orientation as well as a basic health system that can be afforded by the poorest ones.
8. The recognition of private property and free enterprise as the main pillars for boosting the country's well-being along with a guarantee to workers of their right to organize independent labor unions that will promote their collective interests.
9. The restructuring of the armed forces and ensuring its strict separation from the economic and political activities and responsibilities of the country.
10. Once democracy has been established, lobby for the lifting of the United States commercial embargo and for the opening to foreign economic aid until Cuba can establish a basis for its economic recovery."

== See also ==
- Opposition to Fidel Castro
