= Rosa Parks Feminist Movement for Civil Rights =

Rosa Parks Feminist Movement for Civil Rights is a human rights movement in Cuba. It is named after Rosa Parks. The movement is headed by Iris Tamara Pérez Aguilera, the wife of human rights and democracy advocate Jorge Luis García Pérez.

== Demands ==
The movement demands:

- An end to the torture and repression of imprisoned opposition activist Mario Alberto Pérez Aguilera and all other Cuban political prisoners.
- Prompt and just resolutions to the cases of thousands of Cubans without a place to live, renewing the existing "Campaign for Dignified and Decorous Housing for Every Cuban."
- An end to the repression of peaceful human rights defenders, and that the Castro regime ratify and publish international human rights covenants and the Universal Declaration of Human Rights, to which Cuba is signatory.

== See also ==
- Cuban dissidents
