= Jorge Luis García Pérez =

- Spouse: Magalys Rivaflecha

Jorge Luis García Pérez (born 10 October 1964), known as Antúnez, is an Afro-Cuban human rights and democracy activist from Placetas.

== Dissident career ==
Antúnez was jailed for 17 years from 1990 to 2007. Other dissidents have referred to Antúnez as Cuba's Nelson Mandela.

During a demonstration in March 1990, State Security heard him saying that communism is an error and a dystopia. Saying that was a crime of "verbal enemy propaganda", he was sentenced to five years in prison. In prison, he refused to wear the uniform and participate in "re-education", which meant violent beatings, nine months in solitary confinement and more years in prison. He escaped from prison to see his sick mother, but could not find her and was free only for a day. His mother died a month later. He was found guilty of "attempted sabotage". One of the charges was the failure to respect the Cuban leader Fidel Castro.

Antúnez continued nonviolent resistance in prison, where he established a political prisoner group named after Pedro Luis Boitel, an imprisoned dissident who died in a hunger strike in 1972. His courage received worldwide attention. When visiting Cuba in 1998, Pope John Paul II asked the regime to release him.

Antúnez was released in 2007, before talks on European Union sanctions, after being imprisoned for 17 years and 34 days.

Antúnez, his ex-wife Iris, and Diosiris Santana Pérez launched a hunger strike in 2009. Several leaders from Uruguay, Costa Rica, and Argentina declared their support for Antúnez. Police threatened Antúnez with eviction from his house and "disobedience" charges for hosting three other dissident thinkers (Osiris Santana Pérez, Ernesto Mederos Arrozarena and Carlos Michael Morales Rodríguez) in his home in April 2009.

Antúnez's ex-wife founded the Rosa Parks Feminist Movement for Civil Rights. Antúnez himself was a member of Orlando Zapata Tamayo which was to defend political prisoners.

When U.S. President Barack Obama announced a blueprint for normalizing relations with Cuba on 17 December 2014, Antúnez criticized the normalization plan as a capitulation to the Cuban government, echoing the views of Berta Soler and Oscar Elias Biscet that the US should have demanded democratic reforms in Cuba before contemplating a change in US policy towards Cuba.

Antúnez moved to the United States with his wife, Magalys Rivaflecha, and daughter in 2019.

== See also ==
- Cuban democracy movement
- Human rights in Cuba
- Censorship in Cuba
- Cuban dissident movement
