= Amaury Gutiérrez =

Cuban singer and composer

- Born: September 9, 1963 (age 62); San Antonio de las Vueltas, Cuba
- Occupation: Singer-songwriter
- Instruments: Vocals, piano, guitar
- Years active: 1989–present
- Website: amaurymusica.com

Amaury Gutiérrez is a Cuban singer and composer.

== Early life ==
Gutiérrez was born on September 9, 1963. When he was in high school decided to pursue music, and his chance came in response to a call from the School of Art Instructors, an institution where he earned a scholarship.

== Career ==
In his compositions, Amaury Gutiérrez puts special emphasis on the vocal element, not only for his academic past, but also due to the particular feelings that his voice imbues in his performances. His influences include Pablo Milanes, Djavan, Caetano Veloso, Ruben Blades, Andy Montañez, Stevie Wonder, Al Jarreau, Soraya, and Paul McCartney. Gutierrez has stated that he finds it easier to compose music first and then develop the text, having as his principal instrument the guitar.

Gutierrez defines his style as "Cuban Pop", a mixture of various musical genres including the old and the Nueva Trova, a few twists of contemporary music, the authorial sense of the golden age of bolero, and even Mexican music.

His first album, Amaury Gutiérrez (1999) was nominated for a Latin Grammy and sold more than 600,000 copies. He received the Up-and-Coming Artist of the Year Onda Award in Spain in 2000. In 2009 Gutierrez celebrated with a spectacular concert the 20th anniversary of his artistic career with a production by Jossel Calveiro, Reinaldo "Pachy" Lopez and Fernando "Teo "Calveiro, and where he was joined by guests such as Luis Enrique, Gema Corredera among others.

His album Sesiones Intimas won the Latin Grammy Award for Best Singer-Songwriter Album in 2011.

== Activism ==
He has supported the dissident movement Yo No Coopero Con La Dictadura (Do Not Cooperate with the Dictatorship).

== Discography ==
- Amaury Gutiérrez (1999)
- Piedras y Flores (2000)
- Alma Nueva (2001)
- Pedazos de Mi (2006)
- Sesiones Intimas (2010)
- Directo Mío (2014)
- Entre Cuerdas (2015)
- Amaury con Banda (2018)
- Volver a Ti (2023)

== Featured singles ==
- 2008: "A Puro Grito" (Kumbia All Starz featuring Amaury Gutiérrez)
