= Óscar Elías Biscet =

Cuban activist (1961-)

Óscar Elías Biscet González
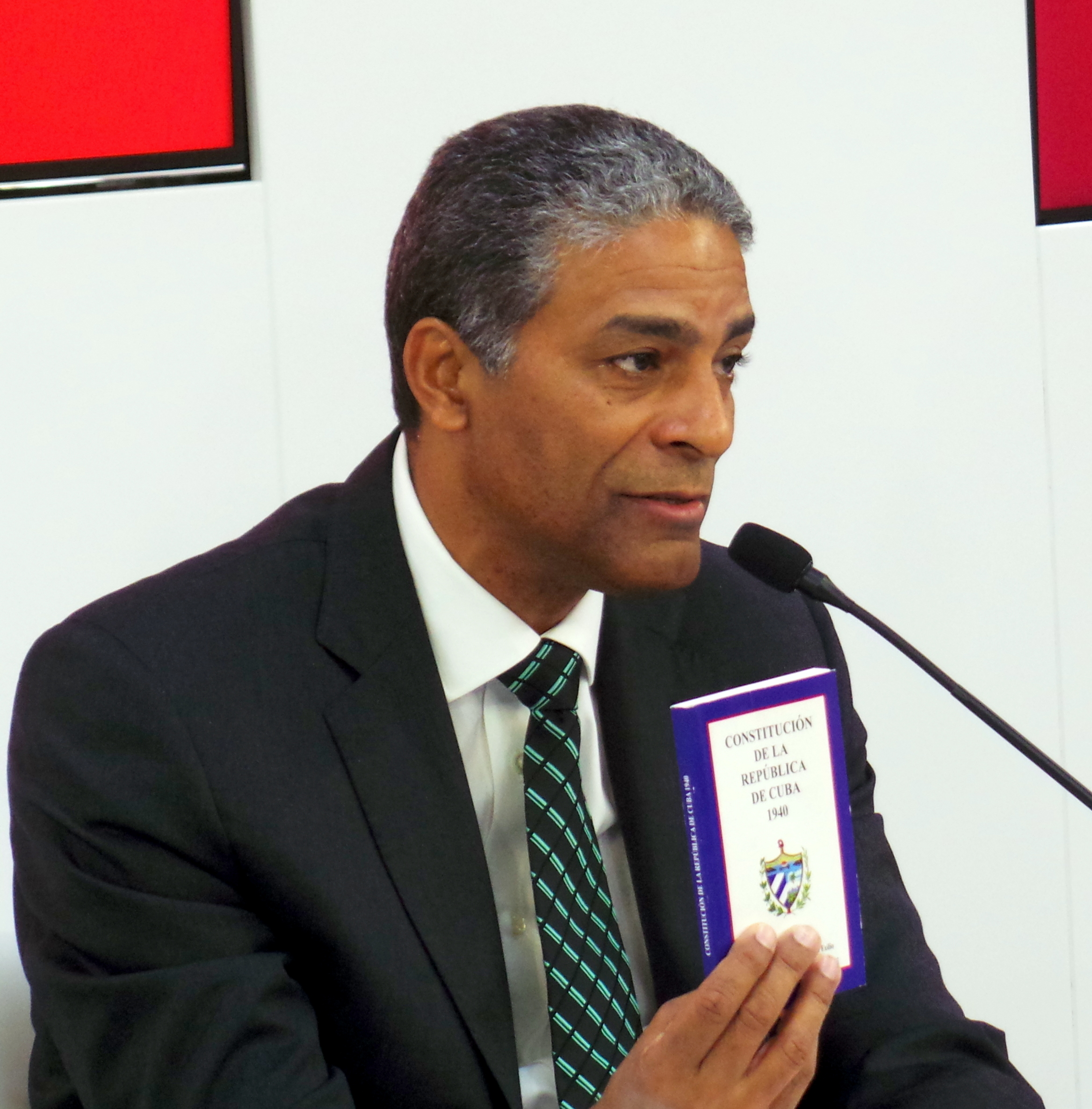
- Biscet in 2016
- Born: July 20, 1961 (age 64); Havana, Cuba
- Occupation: Physician
- Spouse: Elsa Morejón

Óscar Elías Biscet González (born July 20, 1961 in Havana, Cuba) is a Cuban physician and an advocate for human rights and democratic freedoms in Cuba. He is also the founder of the Lawton Foundation.

Biscet was given a 25-year prison sentence in Cuba for allegedly committing crimes against the sovereignty and the integrity of the Cuban territory. Despite appeals from the United Nations, foreign governments, and international human rights organizations, the Cuban Government refused to release Biscet until March 11, 2011. In recognition of his "advocacy efforts for human rights and democracy" in Cuba, Biscet was presented with the Presidential Medal of Freedom by U.S. President George W. Bush in 2007.

== Beginnings ==
Biscet received a degree in medicine in 1985; the following year he initiated protests which led to his immediate suspension. Starting in 1988, Biscet revealed his political tension with the communist regime through speech. The Cuban government in 1994 officially opened a case file on Biscet, labeling him a counter-revolutionary and "dangerous". In 1997, Biscet founded the Lawton Foundation.

== Political and philosophical background ==
Henry David Thoreau, Mohandas Gandhi, and Martin Luther King Jr. are major influences in Biscet's writing and motivation. Others from whom Biscet has taken inspiration are Abraham Lincoln, Thomas Jefferson, José Martí, and Frederick Douglass. He is a strong believer in a democratic government and proved perseverance in criticizing abortion and the suppression of civil liberties.

== Expulsion from the National Health Service ==
Biscet was expelled from the Cuban National Health System in February 1998 because of his activism. The physician's wife, Elsa Morejón was also expelled from nursing (her profession) when her husband started to oppose a widespread use of Rivanol for abortions.

== 1999 arrest ==
In August 1999, Biscet, along with two dozen other dissidents, were detained by Cuban police for organizing meetings in Havana and Matanzas. He was released five days earlier on August 17, 1999. He claimed that while in custody, the police tortured him by beating, kicking, stripping, and burning him. The government then threatened to detain him longer if he continued promoting his counterrevolutionary activities in Cuba. Later in 1999, he was sent back in prison for a three-year sentence. Amnesty International named him a prisoner of conscience and called for his immediate release. He was released from a high-security prison in the Holguín Province after having served his full sentence.

== 2002 arrest ==
One month after being released from custody, on December 6, 2002, Biscet was arrested in a private house with 11 other dissidents while discussing a petition drive and human rights. Biscet's wife later said the activists "were beaten and violently arrested". During their removal from the house they shouted "Long live human rights" and "Freedom for political prisoners".

Biscet was one of the 75 dissidents imprisoned in 2003 by the Cuban authorities for his association with the head of the US Interests Section in Havana, James Cason. He was given a 25-year sentence for "disorderly conduct" and "counter-revolutionary activities". He was subsequently held at Combinado del Este Prison in Havana, where he was generally not allowed outside visitors, including medical practitioners and clergy, under conditions described as "wretched". He had previously been imprisoned in the "Cinco Y Medio" prison in Pinar del Río. A replica of his cell while there was displayed at the residence of the chief of mission, James Cason.

In 2003, in response to a petition concerning Biscet and other Cuban prisoners of conscience, the United Nations Working Group on Arbitrary Detention determined that Biscet is being held in violation of Articles 9, 10, 19, 20, and 21 of the Universal Declaration of Human Rights and called for his immediate release.

On September 1, 2005, in response to an Urgent Action Appeal filed by Freedom Now on behalf of Biscet, the Working Group on Arbitrary Detention, the Special Rapporteur on the Question of Torture, the Special Representative of the Secretary-General on Human Rights Defenders, and the Special Rapporteur on Freedom of Expression and Association issued a joint urgent appeal to the Government of the Republic of Cuba calling again for Biscet's immediate release.

== Campaign to release ==
Freedom Now, a non-profit organization located in Washington, D.C., was retained in 2005 to assist in obtaining Biscet's release from prison. On September 1, 2005, in response to an Urgent Action Appeal filed by Freedom Now on Biscet's behalf, the United Nations called on the Government of the Republic of Cuba to immediately release Biscet.

Nat Hentoff was one of the chief advocates for Biscet in the United States, penning numerous pleas in his syndicated and Village Voice column calling for his release, and highlighting his plight within the Cuban criminal justice system.

=== Release ===
On March 11, 2011, it was announced that Biscet had been freed, along with more than 50 other dissidents. The Catholic Church in Cuba was responsible for negotiating their release. Biscet said shortly after being freed that he planned to remain in Cuba and continue his advocacy for human rights.

In August 2012, he began an independent television show, Revelando Cuba ("Revealing Cuba"), on which he discussed national and international events. The program is produced and distributed by the Lawton Foundation.

== International support ==
In 2007, Biscet received in absentia the Presidential Medal of Freedom, from US President George W. Bush, but the Cuban government denied him a permit to travel to receive it. Finally - nine years later - on June 23, 2016, Biscet received the medal from George Bush in a private ceremony in Dallas, Texas. In 2007 Biscet received in absentia the Dr. Rainer Hildebrandt Human Rights Award endowed by Alexandra Hildebrandt. The award is given annually in recognition of extraordinary, non-violent commitment to human rights.

== See also ==
- Human rights in Cuba
- Politics of Cuba
- Opposition to Fidel Castro
