= Canaleta prison =

Prison in Ciego de Avila, Cuba

Canaleta prison is a top-security Cuban prison located in the south side of Ciego de Avila city. It houses more than 3000 inmates and is the main jail of the province of Ciego de Avila.

== History ==
Four wooden barracks were originally built in 1965, but with the increase of the population under Communist rule, the Castro government was forced to build a modern installation that contained a four-floor wing, a three-floor wing, and a single floor building which operates as a cafeteria.

International Press Freedom Award laureate Jesús Joel Díaz Hernández was imprisoned in Canaleta from 1999 to 2001 on charges of "social dangerousness" related to his reporting.
