= Christian Democratic Party of Cuba =

Christian Democratic Party of Cuba Partido Demócrata Cristiano de Cuba
- President: Elena Larrinaga
- Founded: 1959
- Headquarters: Havana, Cuba
- Ideology: Christian democracy Christian humanism
- Political position: Centre
- International affiliation: Centrist Democrat International; International Democracy Union
- Regional affiliation: Christian Democrat Organization of America; Union of Latin American Parties
- Colors: Green

Website
- pdc-cuba.org

The Christian Democratic Party of Cuba (Spanish: Partido Demócrata Cristiano de Cuba, abbreviated PDC) is a Christian Democratic political party in Cuba affiliated with the Centrist Democrat International (Spanish: Internacional Demócrata de Centro – IDC), the International Democracy Union (Spanish: ), the Christian Democratic Organization of America (Spanish Organización Demócrata Cristiana de América – ODCA) and the Union of Latin American Parties (ULAP).

The Christian Democratic Party (CD) of Cuba is the longest-standing political party founded on the island. Its origins date back to 1959 when José Ignacio Rasco founded the Christian Democratic Movement in Cuba, inspired by Christian humanism, officially becoming a political party in Miami, Florida, in 1991, resulted from a merger between the Christian Democratic Movement and several other organizations defending similar values and principles, which operated in exile due to repression in Cuba. The new Constitution of 2019 limited Cuban political parties to the formation of "mass and social organizations" dedicated "to the tasks of building, consolidating and defending the socialist society" (Article 14). The Communist Party is the only one allowed to campaign or engage in public political activities on the island.

The president of the Christian Democratic Party of Cuba up to 2014 was a Cuban exile Marcelino Miyares Sotolongo and the international secretary was José Ignacio Rasco, also in exile. Rasco founded the Cuban Christian Democratic Movement in 1959. He was a professor, writer, and columnist. In addition, he was President of the Jacques Maritain Institute of Cuba and also President of Editorial Cubana.

In May 2014, the party held its XIII Congress in Miami, in which René Hernández was elected president.

On Saturday, June 2, 2018, Dr. Andrés Hernández Amor was elected President , accompanied by a team made up of three vice presidents: Héctor Caraballo, Enix Berrio Sardá, and René Hernández. During the Congress, the appointment to the Board of Enix Berrio Sardá, an economist and sociologist, resident of Havana, Cuba, received special recognition. He has also been a spokesperson for the Democratic Action Unity Table (MUAD), a well-known group in opposition to the Cuban regime.

On April 29, 2023, the XVII Congress of the PDC was held digitally and Elena Larrinaga was elected president. . Along with her Andres Hernandez, Hector Caraballo, Eddy Delgado, and Dunia Medina, were elected vice presidents.

The PDC, among other postulates, advocates the establishment of a rule of law based on full respect for public freedoms and human rights and the construction of a prosperous and fair society based on the implementation of a Social Market Economy.

The party's manifesto, (created in Miami 1991) states:

"We have decided to found the Christian Democratic Party of Cuba because we wish to offer a political alternative to our mother country in the fight for human rights, economic development, and social justice within a democratic and pluralistic framework."

The party invokes the legacy of José Martí and Simón Bolívar, whom they say "conceived Latin America as a brotherhood of shared, common and sovereign nations."

The PDC has frequently denounced the systematic repression of civil, political, social, economic, and cultural rights of the Cuban people by the communist system that the Castro brothers imposed in Cuba more than six decades ago. The PDC has denounced as well the growing repression exercised against their people by other dictatorial governments in Latin America – of more recent appearance – such as those presided over by Nicolás Maduro in Venezuela and Daniel Ortega in Nicaragua.

== See also ==
- List of political parties in Cuba
