= Department of Revolutionary Orientation =

The Department of Revolutionary Orientation (Spanish: Departamento de Orientación Revolucionaria, DOR) is a division of the Central Committee of the Communist Party of Cuba.

== See also ==
- Committees for the Defense of the Revolution
