= Cuban Observatory of Human Rights =

Cuban nonprofit organization

The Cuban Observatory of Human Rights (Observatorio Cubano de Derechos Humanos – OCDH) is a nonprofit organization with a stated objective of monitoring and reporting human rights violations in Cuba, documenting repression, political imprisonment, and abuses against activists and civilians.

Established in 2009 in Madrid Spain and based there, it states it is "mainly composed" of former Cuban prisoners of conscience, belonging to the Group of 75, imprisoned "in the case known as Cuba's Black Spring of 2003". The organisation says its "areas of action" include political repression, violations human rights to health, employment, housing, education, and food ("social rights"); proposals to achieve economic freedom and prosperity ("economic rights"); and support for initiatives to release political prisoners and to provide humanitarian assistance to their families. Its 2025 report EL ESTADO DE LOS DERECHOS SOCIALES EN CUBA was cited by Human Rights Watch in its World Report. The group and/or its work has been cited by Reuters, CiberCuba, ADN Cuba, and Cuba Headlines.

The organization receives funding from the United States government. According to the Department of State, the organization received $1,450,048 from the U.S. Agency for International Development in 2025.
