= Politics of Cuba =

Cuba is a communist country and has had a socialist political system since 1961 based on the "one state, one party" principle. Cuba is constitutionally defined as a unitary one-party Marxist–Leninist socialist republic. The present Constitution of Cuba, approved in a referendum on 24 February 2019, also describes the role of the Communist Party of Cuba to be the "leading force of society and of the state" and as having the capability of setting national policy, and the first secretary of the Communist Party is the most powerful position in Cuba. The 2019 Constitution of Cuba states it is guided by the examples of Cuban independence hero José Martí and revolutionary leader Fidel Castro and the ideals of Marx, Engels, and Lenin.

The president of Cuba is Miguel Díaz-Canel, who succeeded Raúl Castro as first secretary of the Communist Party in 2021. Executive power is exercised by the government, which is represented by the Council of Ministers, headed by the prime minister of Cuba. Legislative power is exercised through the unicameral National Assembly of People's Power, which is constituted as the maximum authority of the state. With effect from 10 October 2019, Miguel Díaz-Canel is the president and Manuel Marrero is the prime minister of Cuba. The previous president of the State Council was Raúl Castro, brother of former leader Fidel Castro; Raúl Castro remained First Secretary of the Communist Party of Cuba, and commander-in-chief of the Revolutionary Armed Forces until 19 April 2021. Fidel Castro ruled from 1959 to 2006, before illness forced him to hand power to his brother. Esteban Lazo Hernández is the president of the National Assembly.

Political scientists characterize the political system of Cuba as a single-party authoritarian regime where political opposition is not permitted. There are elections, but they are not considered democratic. According to the V-Dem Democracy Indices, Cuba is the second least democratic country in Latin America.

Censorship of information (including limits to internet access) is extensive, and independent journalism is repressed in Cuba; Reporters Without Borders has characterized Cuba as one of the worst countries in the world for press freedom.

== Executive ==
Executive power in the Cuban government is exercised by the Council of Ministers. From February 1959 until February 2008, Cuba was led by revolutionary leader Fidel Castro, who was head of state, head of government, first secretary of the Communist Party, and commander-in-chief of the Cuban armed forces. The Ministry of Interior is the principal organ of state security and control.

According to the article 94 of the constitution, the first vice president of the Council of State assumes presidential duties upon the illness or death of the president. On July 31, 2006, during the 2006 Cuban transfer of duties, Fidel Castro delegated his duties as president of the Council of State, first secretary of the Communist Party, and the post of commander in chief of the armed forces to first vice president Raúl Castro. Since 2019, the president of Cuba is also limited to two five year terms.

== Legislature ==
Voter turnout: Cuba parliamentary elections (1993–2018).

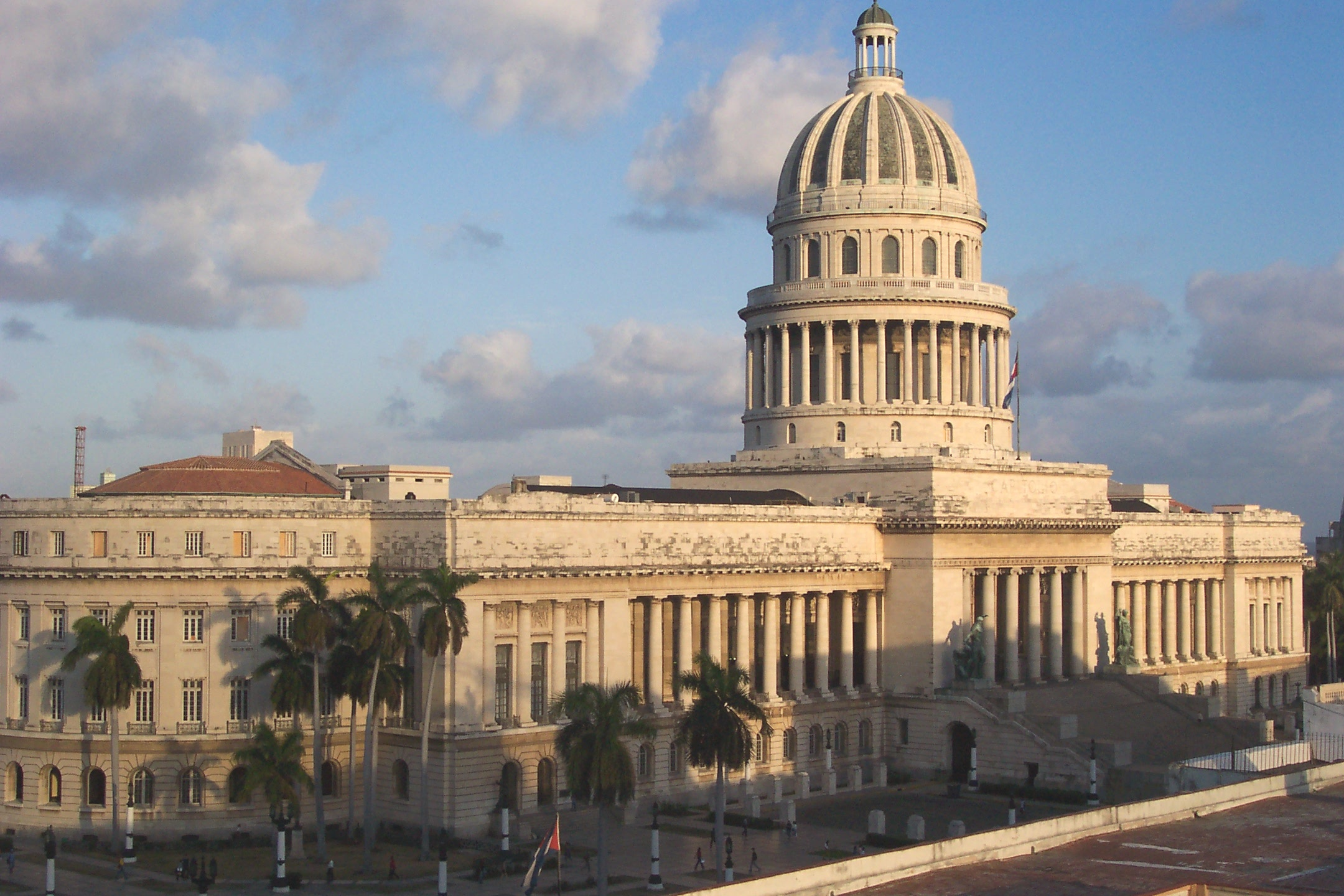
El Capitolio, former seat of the National Assembly of People's Power.

Cuba has an elected national legislature, the National Assembly of People's Power (Asamblea Nacional del Poder Popular), which has 612 members, elected every 5 years and holds brief sessions to ratify decisions by the executive branch. The National Assembly convenes twice a year in ordinary periods of sessions. However, it has permanent commissions to look after issues of legislative interest. Among its permanent or temporary commissions are those in charge of issues concerning the economy, sugar industry, industries, transportation and communications, constructions, foreign affairs, public health, defense and interior order. The National Assembly also has permanent departments that oversee the work of the Commissions, Local Assemblies of the People's Power, International Relations, Judicial Affairs and the Administration.

Article 88(h) of the Constitution of Cuba, adopted in 1976, provides for citizen proposals of law, prerequisite that the proposal be made by at least 10,000 citizens who are eligible to vote. In 2002 supporters of a movement known as the Varela Project submitted a citizen proposal of law with 11,000 signatures calling for a national referendum on political and economic reforms. The Government response was to collect 8.1 million signatures to request that Cuba's National Assembly enact a constitutional amendment making socialism an unalterable feature of Cuban government.

== Committees for the Defense of the Revolution ==
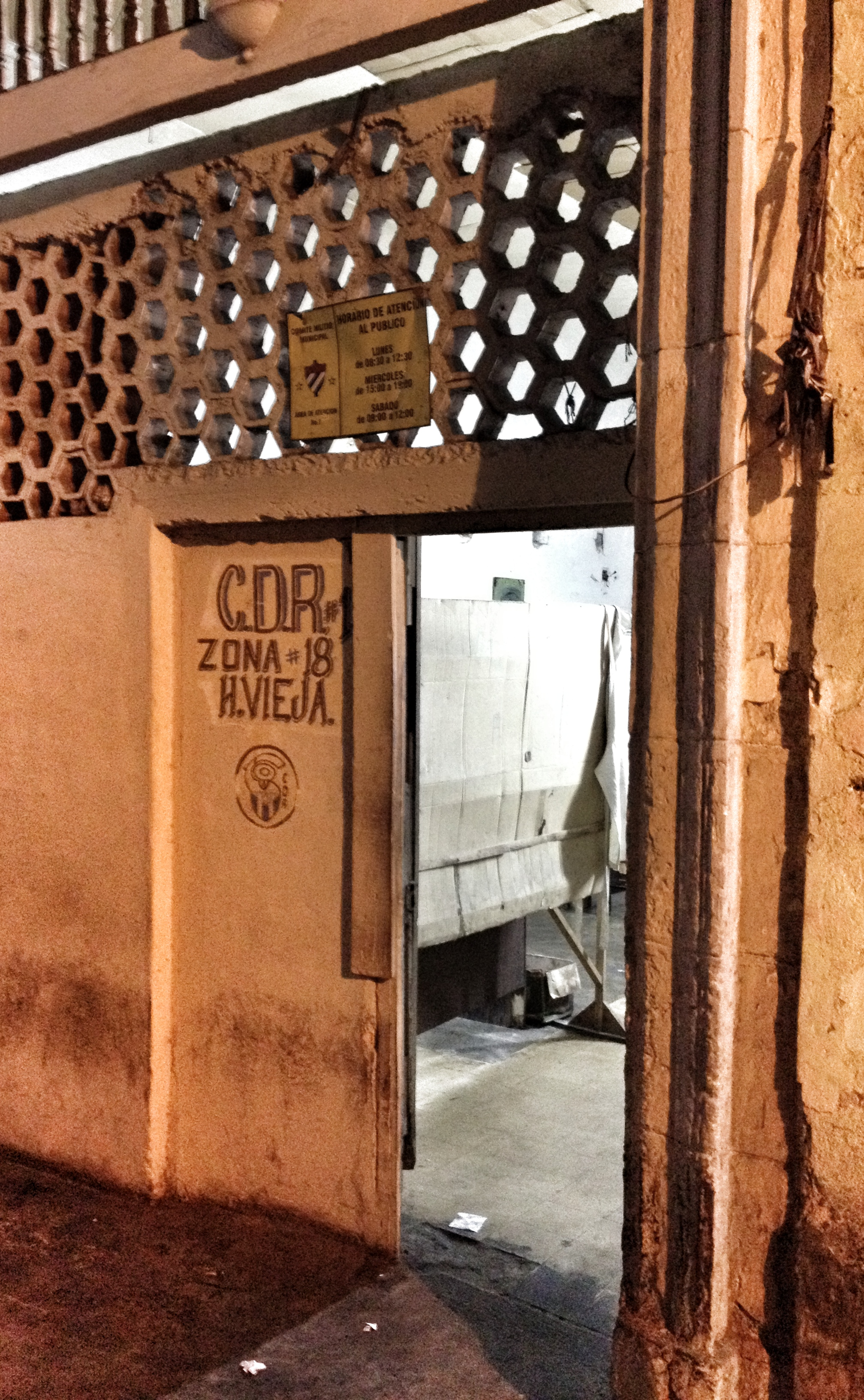
A CDR in Old Havana on Paseo de Martí facing Parque Central

The Committees for the Defense of the Revolution is a network of neighborhood organizations across Cuba of which most Cubans are members. The organizations are designed to put medical, educational or other campaigns into national effect, and to report "counter-revolutionary" activity. It is the duty of the CDR officials to know the political activities of each person in their respective blocks.

== Political parties and elections ==
=== Suffrage ===
Suffrage is automatically afforded to Cuban citizens who have resided in Cuba for at least two years and are at least sixteen years old. Those legally declared "mentally handicapped" or who are serving time in prison cannot exercise this right. Cubans who live abroad for personal reasons for more than 24 consecutive months lose their right to vote. The national elections for the 470 members of the National Assembly of People's Power are held according to this system and the precepts of the 1976 Constitution.

=== Elections ===
General elections consist of two phases: municipal elections and elections to ANPP (National Assembly of People's Power, or Parliament). They are usually called in July and are held every five years. After elections are called, Council of State designates members of CEN (National Electoral Commission). The CEN oversees elections, but does not participate in them. It is responsible for surveying and inspecting the election procedure and ensure it conforms with the Constitution and electoral law. The CEN appoints CEP (Provincial Electoral Commission), which in turn appoints CEM (Municipal Electoral Commission). The latter lead formation of electoral commissions at the grassroots. There are roughly 1450 people in each of these circunscripcións.

=== Candidates ===
For the purpose of Municipal elections, each circunscripción is further divided into two to eight areas with the goal of allowing nomination meetings to be very compressed and based on the grassroots. The number of nomination areas is determined by the population in the circunscripción. In rural areas, extension of territory is also taken into consideration. People have the right to participate, nominate and vote only in the area in which they live. Nomination area assembly meetings are normally held in public areas at eight o'clock in the evening on weekdays or during the day on the weekend. Each assembly is presided over by the local electoral commission. Individuals have the right to propose anyone who lives in their circunscripción as long as the person has indicated they are willing to be nominated. The person nominating must provide a reason for nomination. Others have the right to argue against a nomination. When this is done, a show-of-hands vote is taken and counted by the electoral commission. The person with the most votes becomes the candidate for that nomination area. In order to ensure the law is being followed, members of CEP make surprise visits to nomination meetings.

Once candidates have been nominated, the local electoral commission obtains a short biographical profile and a photo from them. These are posted in local public spaces for easy access to voters. This is the only publicity permitted under the electoral law. Voters are expected to read the profiles in order to make their choice. Campaigning is not permitted. Duharte Díaz, professor at University of Havana, is of the opinion that posting profiles is insufficient and that more should be done to present the candidates.

=== Local elections ===
Municipal elections are usually held in October. On the day of the vote, held always on a Sunday, voters confirm their voting eligibility by presenting their identification cards and are then handed a ballot with names of candidates nominated in their circunscripción. Voting is secret. To win, a candidate must receive at least 50% plus one of the vote. If this does not happen, the candidate who placed last is eliminated and voting is repeated with remaining candidates.

Candidates elected in municipal elections carry out their functions on a voluntary basis after their regular work hours. Once municipal assemblies are constituted, they elect their presidents and vice-presidents from among themselves. These individuals are the only ones who are full-time, earning the same salary as they received at their place of work.

=== Parliamentary elections ===
Second phase, elections to ANPP (Parliament), is different from municipal elections. Up to half of the members of parliament are nominated from individuals elected in municipal election. The rest are nominated by mass organisations. These are Workers' Central Union of Cuba, Federation of Cuban Women, National Association of Small Farmers, Federation of University Students, Federation of Pre-University Students and Committees for the Defense of the Revolution. To propose candidates for elections each of the six mass organisations assembles at all three levels in plenary sessions to propose candidates from the population. The goal is to obtain a pool of potential candidates representing a wide cross-section of the population. Because of this, each of the mass organisations at all three levels (municipal, provincial, national) has the right to propose at least three times the number of candidates needed for each municipality to be represented in the parliament. The proposals are sent to CCN (National Candidacies Commission) which then reduces the list down to the number of seats.

Before elections (that usually happen in January), meetings between candidates and workers are held in places of work and in the neighbourhoods. Similarly to municipal elections, the only publicity allowed is a short biography and a photo. Elections happen on a Sunday. Voters are given a ballot with the names of candidates chosen by the CCN to represent their municipality. They can choose to vote for all, some or none of the candidates. To be elected, a candidate must receive at least 50% plus one of the valid votes. If they do not, a new candidate is chosen for the seat and voting repeated.

== State leaders ==
=== Communist Party of Cuba ===
The organization of Cuba's political system reflects the Marxist–Leninist principle of democratic centralism.

- First Secretary: Miguel Díaz-Canel Bermúdez
- Second Secretary: Jose Ramon Machado Ventura
- Members of Politburo: Miguel Mario Díaz-Canel Bermúdez, Juan Esteban Lazo Hernández, Salvador Valdés Mesa, José Ramón Machado Ventura, Roberto Morales Ojeda, Álvaro López Miera, Bruno Rodríguez Parrilla, Abelardo Álvarez Gil, Ulises Guilarte de Nacimiento, Teresa María Amarelle Bué, Marta Ayala Ávila, Manuel Marrero Cruz, José Amado Ricardo Guerra, Luis Alberto Rodríguez López-Calleja, Lázaro Alberto Álvarez Casas, Gladys Martínez Verdecia.
- Members of Secretariat: Miguel Díaz-Canel, Jose Ramon Machado Ventura, Abelardo Álvarez Gil, Roberto Morales Ojeda, Rogelio Polanco Fuentes, Joel Queipo Ruiz, José Ramón Monteagudo Ruiz, Félix Duarte Ortega, Jorge Luis Broche Lorenzo.

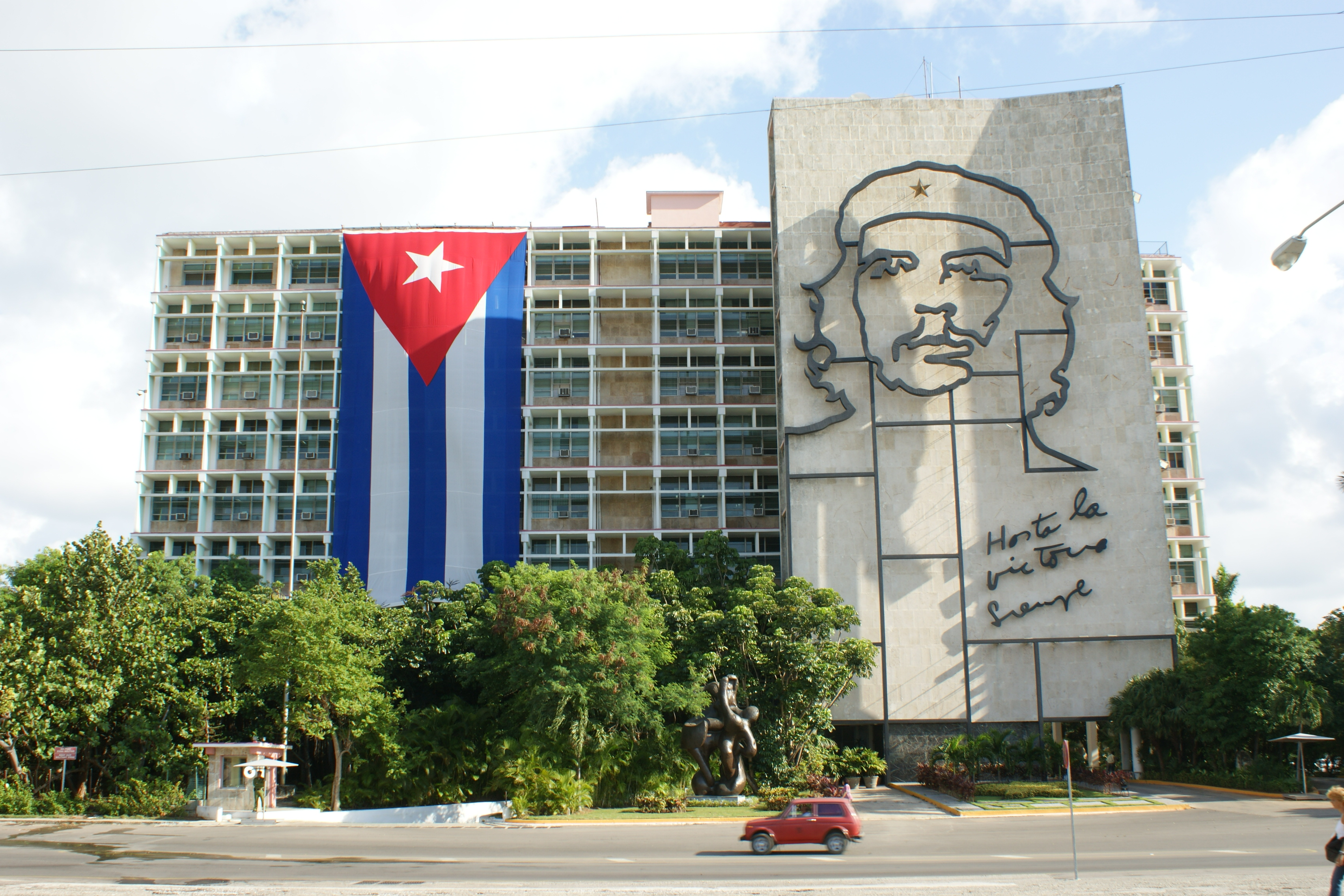
Ministry of the Interior building on the Plaza de la Revolución, Havana

=== Council of Ministers ===
- Prime Minister: Manuel Marrero
- First Deputy Prime Minister: Salvador Valdés Mesa
- Deputy Prime Ministers: Marino Alberto Murillo Jorge, Ulises Rosales del Toro, Ramiro Valdés Menéndez, Ricardo Cabrisas Ruíz, Antonio Enrique Lussón Batlle
- Minister of Interior: Lázaro Alberto Álvarez Casas
- Minister of the Armed Forces: Álvaro López Miera

=== Council of State and National Assembly of People's Power ===
- President: Esteban Lazo Hernández
- Vice President: Ana María Mari Machado
- Secretary: Homero Acosta Álvarez

== Foreign relations ==
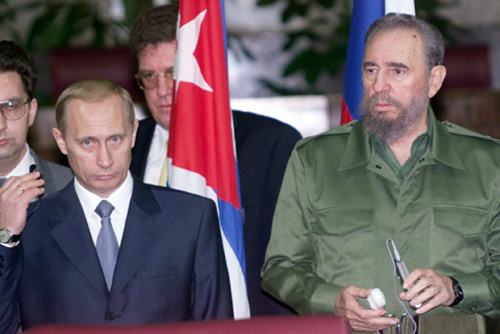
Vladimir Putin and Fidel Castro in 2001.

Cuba's foreign policy has been scaled back and redirected as a result of economic hardship after the collapse of the Soviet bloc. Without massive Soviet subsidies and its primary trading partner Cuba was comparatively isolated in the 1990s, but has since entered bilateral co-operation with several South American countries, most notably Venezuela and Bolivia. Cuba has normal diplomatic and economic relations with every country in the Western hemisphere except the United States. The United States continues an embargo "so long as [Cuba] continues to refuse to move toward democratization and greater respect for human rights." The European Union accuses Cuba of "continuing flagrant violation of human rights and fundamental freedoms", but also "Reiterates its condemnation of the US embargo on Cuba, and calls for it to be lifted forthwith, as the UN General Assembly has repeatedly demanded."

Cuba has developed a growing relationship with the People's Republic of China and Russia. In all, Cuba continues to have formal relations with 160 nations, and provided civilian assistance workers – principally medical – in more than 20 nations. More than two million exiles have escaped to foreign countries. Cuba's present Minister of Foreign Affairs is Bruno Rodríguez Parrilla.

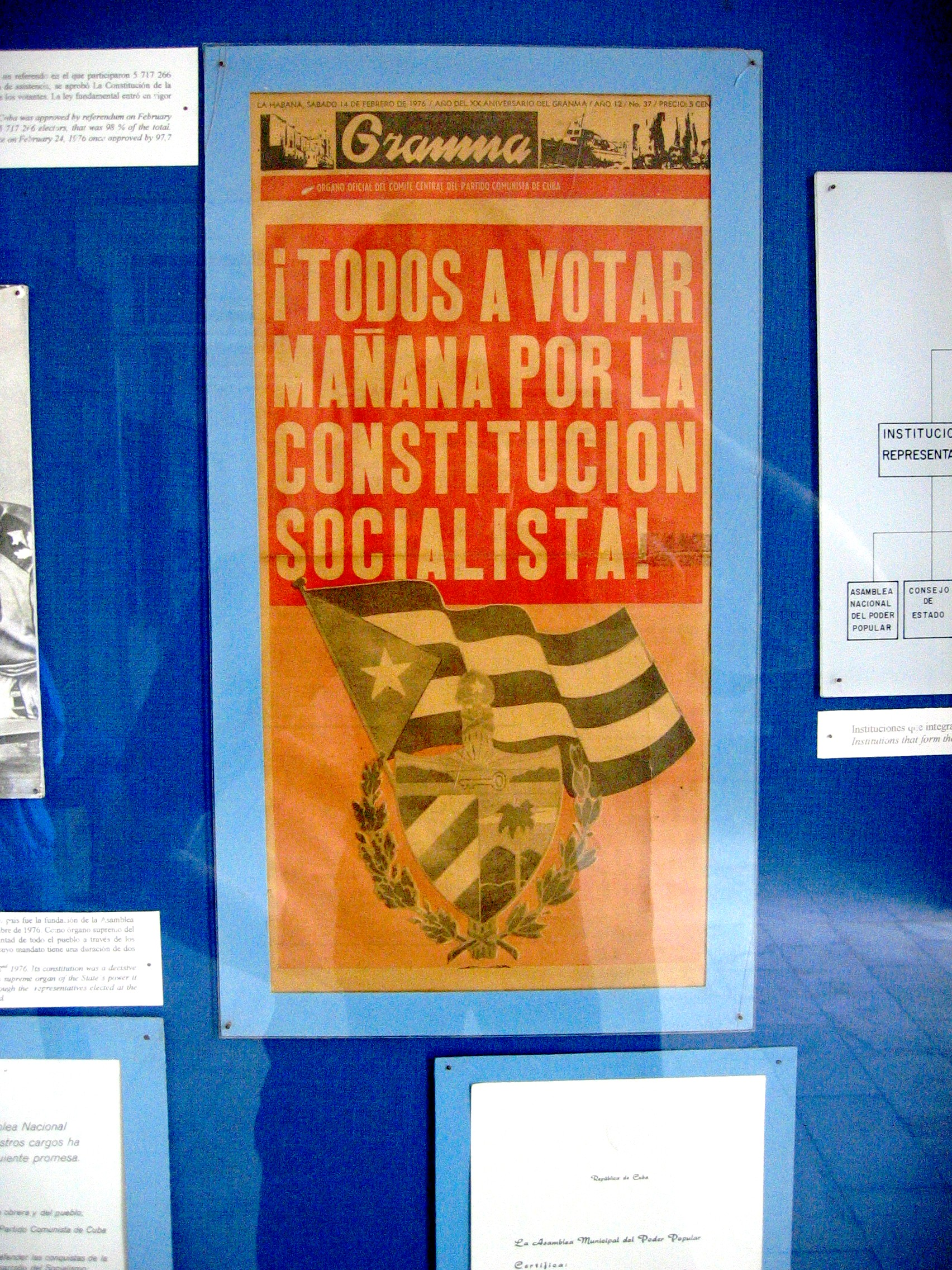
Poster urging citizens to vote to make the socialist system permanent and irrevocable by amending the constitution

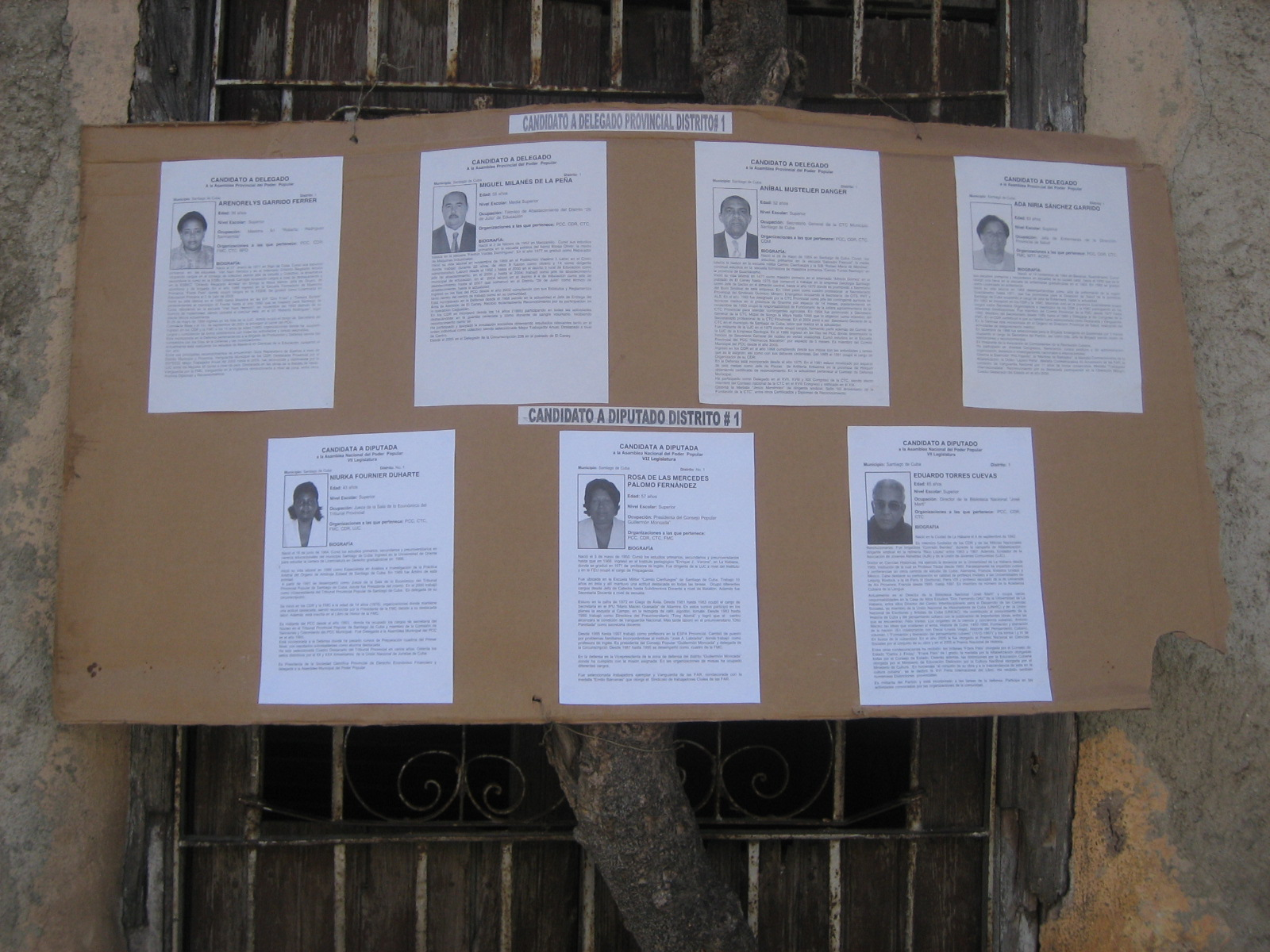
Candidates of the 2008 elections of the national and provincial parliaments in Santiago de Cuba

== Authoritarianism ==
Some political scientists characterize the political system of Cuba as non-democratic and authoritarian, while others challenge this characterization. It is a single-party state where political opposition is not permitted. The function of the party is different to that in liberal democracies. It does not propose candidates and is not allowed to influence elections. Candidates are instead nominated directly by citizens with a show of hands in circunscripciones (very small districts). Critics challenge whether this is democratic. Censorship of information (including limits to internet access) is extensive, and independent journalism is repressed in Cuba; Reporters Without Borders has characterized Cuba as one of the worst countries in the world for press freedom.

Officially, Cuba frames itself as a "people's democracy", as opposed to the "liberal democracy" of Western states. Cuba thus rejects criticism of its political system as a lack of appreciation for different forms of democracy other than those in capitalist states. It alludes to the grass roots elements in the nomination of candidates at neighborhood level (in the so-called circunscripciónes). An 2025 Cuban Observatory of Human Rights opinion poll found high disapproval rates of the government of Cuba.

Opposition groups inside and outside the country as well as a summary published by Human Rights Watch and certain foreign governments have described the Cuban political system as undemocratic. On the other hand, Cuba is a member of organisations ALBA and CELAC, that consider themselves democratic. The United States Government has initiated various policy measures ostensibly designed to urge Cuba to undertake political change towards a multi-party electoral system. These plans have been condemned by the Cuban Government, who accuses the United States of meddling in Cuba's affairs.

== Human rights ==
According to Human Rights Watch, Castro constructed a "repressive machinery" that continues to deprive Cubans of their basic rights. The Cuban government has been accused of numerous human rights abuses, including torture, arbitrary imprisonment, unfair trials, and extrajudicial executions (a.k.a. "El Paredón"). Human Rights Watch reports that the government represses nearly all forms of political dissent.

The country's first ever transgender municipal delegate was elected in the province of Villa Clara in early 2013. Adela Hernández is a resident of the town of Caibarién and works as a nurse electrocardiogram specialist. In Cuba, delegates are not professional politicians and, therefore, do not receive a government salary.

In 2022, the Family Code constitutional amendment passed. This followed hundreds of painstaking assembly discussions within communities and institutions across the island. This Code ensures the protection of rights of adoption, surrogacy, transgender-affirmation, same-sex marriages and the legitimacy of intergenerational households.

== Corruption ==
The 2012 Transparency International Corruption Perceptions Index ranked Cuba 58th out of 176 countries, tied with Jordan and Namibia. and has lower levels than most of the other countries in the Caribbean and Central America. In 2006, it was ranked in 112th place, tied with India.
