= Censorship in Cuba =

Censorship in Cuba has been the topic of accusations put forward by several foreign groups-organizations and political leaders, as well as Cuban dissidents. The accusations led the European Union to impose sanctions from 2003 to 2008 as well as statements of protest from groups, governments, and noted individuals.

Cuba has ranked low on the Press Freedom Index from Reporters Without Borders from 2002 when the index was established (134th out of 139) to the present (169th out of 180 in 2015). In 2006 the Inter American Press Association reported that "repression against independent journalists, mistreatment of jailed reporters, and very strict government surveillance limiting the people's access to alternative sources of information are continuing".

In the past, books, newspapers, radio channels, television channels, movies and music were heavily censored and clandestine printing was highly restricted. In recent years, this has changed with the Cuban public having easy (but often expensive) access to the internet and mobile phones with little apparent filtering taking place.

Foreign journalists who can work in the country are selected by the government.

Media is operated under the supervision of the Communist Party's Department of Revolutionary Orientation, which "develops and coordinates propaganda strategies".

== Laws and government institutions ==
This section reflects the legal situation under the 1976 constitution of Cuba and does not reflect the changes brought under the 2019 Constitution of Cuba.

The Cuban Constitution of 1976 guaranteed religious freedom and freedom of conscience (articles 8 and 55), freedom and full dignity of man (article 9), freedom of speech and the press (article 53), and the rights of assembly, demonstration, and association (article 54). However, freedom of speech and the press must be exercised in accordance with the aims of socialist society and none of the freedoms granted to citizens can be exercised against the provisions of the Constitution and laws, nor against the existence and objectives of the socialist state, or against the decision of the Cuban people to build socialism and communism (article 62).

Civilian courts exist at the municipal, provincial, and Supreme Court levels. The constitution recognizes the independence of the judiciary, but the judiciary is directly subordinate to the National Assembly, which can remove or appoint judges at any time and in practice the judiciary is dominated by political considerations. Special tribunals are convened for political ("counterrevolutionary") and other cases deemed sensitive to "state security" and held behind closed doors.

Laws related to censorship include:

- A provision regarding contempt for authority (desacato) penalizes anyone who "threatens, libels or slanders, defames, affronts (injuria) or in any other way insults (ultraje) or offends, with the spoken word or in writing, the dignity or decorum of an authority, public functionary, or his agents or auxiliaries." Penalties are from three months to one year in prison, plus a fine. If the person demonstrates contempt for the President of the Council of the State, the President of the National Assembly of Popular Power, the members of the Council of the State or the Council of Ministers, or the Deputies of the National Assembly of the Popular Power, the penalty is from one to three years in prison.
- Anyone who "publicly defames, denigrates, or scorns the Republic's institutions, the political, mass, or social organizations of the country, or the heroes or martyrs of the nation" is subject to from three months to one year in prison. This sweeping provision potentially outlaws mere expressions of dissatisfaction or disagreement with government policies or practices.
- Clandestine printing is a crime against public order and anyone who "produces, disseminates, or directs the circulation of publications without indicating the printer or the place where it was printed, or without following the established rules for the identification of the author or origin, or reproduces, stores, or transports" such publications, can be sentenced to from three months to one year in prison.

The Interior Ministry has principal responsibility for monitoring the Cuban population for signs of dissent. The ministry employs two central offices for this purpose: the General Directorate of Counter-Intelligence, which supervises the Department of State Security, also known as the Political Police, and the General Directorate of Internal Order, which supervises two police units with internal surveillance responsibilities, the National Revolutionary Police and the Technical Department of Investigation (Departamento Técnico de Investigaciones, DTI).

The Singular Systems of Vigilance and Protection (Sistema Unico de Vigilancia y Protección, SUVP) reach across several state institutions, including the Communist Party, the police, the CDRs, the state-controlled labor union, student groups, and members of mass organizations. The government calls on SUVPs to carry out surveillance and to intimidate opposition activists. Rapid Action Brigades (Brigadas de Acción Rápida, also referred to as Rapid Response Brigades, or Brigadas de Respuesta Rápida) are groups of government organized civilians that observe and control dissidents.

Migration and housing officials threaten activists with forced exile, the loss of their homes, or by imposing fines. Political fidelity is monitored at workplaces and in schools: academic and labor files (expedientes escolares y laborales) that record actions or statements that may bear on a person's loyalty are maintained for each citizen and an individual's record must be deemed acceptable before they can advance to a new school or position.

Cuba had 21 journalists in prison in 2008, placing it second only to the People's Republic of China, according to The Committee to Protect Journalists (CPJ), an international NGO. By December 2011 this number had dropped to zero, although many prisoners were forced into exile in exchange for their freedom. However, journalists continued to be at risk of imprisonment or other severe sanctions if they engage in independent reporting or commentary. The Cuban government still uses arbitrary arrests and short-term detentions to restrict freedom of assembly and expression. By 2012 journalists were being jailed again, and in that year Amnesty International demanded the release of Cuban journalists jailed for listening to hip-hop music, and noted that "repression in Cuba is as strong as ever".

Most recently, several Cuban journalists have been detained or harassed because of their coverage of various issues such as "the trial of a religious couple from Guantánamo who demanded homeschooling for their children, which is prohibited on the island", and for reporting on the issues caused by the COVID-19 pandemic. The Cuban government was also accused by the Human Rights Watch international organization of using the pandemic to "harass and imprison critics."

== Media and culture ==
Cubans are discouraged from listening to independent, private, or foreign broadcasts. In 1963, using Soviet-supplied equipment, Cuba became the first nation in the Western Hemisphere to jam radio broadcasts, the apparent targets being the anti-Castro stations in the US. In the past, Cubans were banned from reading books, magazines or newspapers unless they have been approved/published by the government in the past.

The Communist regime established a control of Cuba's film industry, and it was made compulsory for all movies to be censored by the Instituto Cubano del Arte e Industria Cinematográficos before broadcast or release. In recent years, with the emergence of alternative methods to create films, according to the Museum of Modern Art (MoMA), "the list of censored or repressed works increased rapidly".

In 1993 a formal structure and system of reporting news not approved by the government was first attempted. This effort for an organized, independent, and uncensored news agency was spearheaded by Cuban human rights activist and then-President of Christian Democratic Movement of Cuba Jesús Permuy. It formally began in May of that year as Members of Civic Democratic Action, an umbrella group of nearly twenty Castro opposition organizations, formed an alliance with the Independent Cuban Journalists Association. The effort, however, ultimately failed.

In October 1994, five "counterrevolutionaries" were convicted of rebellion and each sentenced to ten years in prison. The judges characterized the group's actions as nonviolent, but found they had prepared and distributed calls for changes in the country's social, political, and economic systems, citing the Universal Declaration of Human Rights. The court characterized the Universal Declaration of Human Rights and denunciations of Cuban human rights violations as counterrevolutionary propaganda.

An article published on 19 November 1999 by Maria Elena Rodriguez, a journalist for the Cuba-Verdad Press, described the burning and burying of hundreds of books donated to Cuba by the government of Spain. Unexplained at the time was why all of the books in the Spanish-donated shipment, even those on seemingly non-controversial topics such as children's literature and medical textbooks were destroyed. It was later revealed that some 8,000 pamphlets containing the text of the Universal Declaration of Human Rights were discovered in the shipment. Rather than risking overlooking any pamphlets that may have been inserted in the pages of even the "safe" books in the shipment, the Cuban authorities apparently thought the wisest course was to destroy every one of the books sent from Spain.

In 2002, following the Hip Hop Festival held in Havana in August, the Casa de Cultura in Alamar received an order from the Ministry of Culture to review the lyrics of rap songs before the start of any concert. Cuban rappers responded by altering their music/lyric styles. Underground's beat slowed down its tempo and rappers started changing their lyrics. The strident notes coming from the barrios and caseríos that scared the State so much when they first came out they started softening themselves to take advantage of the promotional opportunities offered by those same people who initiated the hunting spree.

In August 2006, the Cuban government announced a warning to owners of illegal television satellite dishes, citing as a concern that the United States could use the dishes to transmit programming with "destabilizing, subversive content". Also, Cuba jammed Radio Republica, a clandestine broadcast to Cuba on 7205 kHz. The output of the Television Network teleSUR in Cuba is subject to various restrictions.

Starting in 2010 and 2011, religious groups reported greater latitude to voice their opinions during sermons and at religious gatherings than in the past, although most members of the clergy continued to exercise self-censorship. Religious leaders in some cases criticized the government, its policies, and even the country's leadership without reprisals. In September the Catholic Church opened a cultural center in Havana that hosted debates featuring participants voicing different opinions about the country's future at which well-known dissidents were allowed to participate. The Catholic Church published two periodicals that sometimes included criticism of official social and economic policies.

In March 2012 Cuban police beat and then arrested at least 50 female members of the Ladies in White, a prominent dissident group, who were holding demonstrations just days before the visit of Pope Benedict XVI. All but two of demonstrators were released within a day or two. The move was seen as a warning from the government not to interfere with the papal trip, the first to the island since John Paul II's 1998 visit.

On 24 July 2012 dozens of anti-government activists were arrested as they made their way to the funeral of Oswaldo Paya Sardiñas, a prominent critic of Cuba's government.

== Internet ==
In the past, the Cuban internet was described as being tightly controlled, and has been listed as an "Internet Enemy" by Reporters Without Borders since the list was created in 2006. Today, however, the internet in Cuba appears to be largely open and uncensored.

Most internet access in the country is provided via public wifi hotspots in certain areas in city centers, managed by the government telecommunication company ETECSA, but a growing number of private homes and businesses now have access to the internet.

Miguel Ramirez, Cuba's ambassador to New Zealand, has argued that Cuba has the right to "regulate access to [the] Internet and avoid hackers, stealing passwords, [and] access to pornographic, satanic cults, terrorist or other negative sites".

In 2009, Cuban authorities claimed that 1,600,000 Cubans, about twelve percent of the population, have access to the Internet. They also claimed that there were 630,000 computers available on the island in 2008, a 23% increase over 2007.

== Mobile phones ==
Prior to March 2008 mobile phones were banned. However, they could be used by those who needed them as part of their work. In March 2008 Raul Castro lifted the ban on mobile phones along with other consumer goods. The state-run telecommunications company, ETECSA, says the revenues will be used to fund telecommunications development in Cuba. In February 2009, ETECSA said that its subscriber base had surged by 60% to reach nearly half a million customers. Nearly 8,000 new connections were purchased in the first ten days after the restrictions were lifted. The government also halved the cost of the sign-up fee. The local newspaper, Juventud Rebelde reported that around 480,000 cellular lines are now in use, compared with 300,000 before the change.

Between 2009 and 2012 the U.S. secretly created and funded a Twitter-like service for Cubans called ZunZuneo, initially based on mobile phone text message service and later with an internet interface. The service was funded by the U.S. Agency for International Development through its Office of Transition Initiatives, who utilized contractors and front companies in the Cayman Islands, Spain and Ireland. A longer-term objective was to organize "smart mobs" that might "renegotiate the balance of power between the state and society." A database about the subscribers was created, including gender, age, and "political tendencies". At its peak ZunZuneo had 40,000 Cuban users, but the service closed as financially unsustainable when U.S. funding was stopped.

== International attention ==
Sanctions, imposed by the European Union in 2003 as a response to a crackdown against dissidents (Black Spring), were lifted in 2008, in spite of a finding by the EU council that "the state of human rights had deteriorated" since sanctions were initially imposed.

In 2001 and 2003 the International Federation of Library Associations and Institutions and its Committee of Free Access to Information and Freedom of Expression expressed their deep concern about the continuing violations of the basic human right to freedom of access to information and freedom of expression in Cuba.

In November 2006 the U.S. State Department's Office for Cuban Affairs issued a statement praising the Global Coordinating Committee of Press Freedom Organizations for their efforts to bring attention to the "unjust jailing of journalists" in Cuba.

In 2006 the Committee to Protect Journalists (CPJ) named Cuba one of the ten most censored countries in the world. In 2009 CPJ ranked Cuba as the world's fourth worst place for bloggers, stating that "only government officials and people with links to the Communist Party have Web access" and "only pro-government bloggers can post their material on domestic sites that can be easily accessed".

In June 2007 the Inter American Press Association, a nonprofit organization devoted to defending freedom of speech and freedom of the press in the Americas, stated how disgraceful it is that "Not only are these individuals being denied their right to free speech, but their very lives are being endangered by denying them adequate health care." For example, imprisoned journalist Omar Ruiz Hernández had tuberculosis and a chronic parasitic infection, and weighed only 45 kilograms (about 100 pounds).

== See also ==
- Acts of repudiation – Violence against critics of Cuban government
- Committees for the Defense of the Revolution – Network of neighborhood committees across Cuba
- Decree 349 – Cuban law restricting artistic expression
- Grassroots dictatorship
- Social dangerousness in Cuba
