= List of newspapers in Cuba =

Juventud Rebelde, daily newspaper of Cuba's young communists

This is a list of newspapers in Cuba. All newspapers published in Cuba are tightly controlled by the Cuban government, led by the Communist Party of Cuba. Independent digital media in Cuba is mostly financed by the US Government through the National Endowment for Democracy or other organizations, or in some cases through other governments.

== National newspapers ==
- Granma — published by the Communist Party of Cuba
- Juventud Rebelde — published by the Union of Young Communists
- Trabajadores — published by the Centre of Cuban Workers
- Kwong Wah Po 光华报 (Chinese language; established as La voz de los obreros y campesinos in 1928)

== Provincial newspapers ==
Each of Cuba's 16 provinces has a regional weekly, which acts as the official newspaper published by each provincial Communist Party branch. The two most recently launched, El Artemiseño and Mayabeque, began publication in 2011, to serve the newly formed provinces of Artemisa and Mayabeque.

Each weekly has its own website with local news, updated daily, which offers weekly print editions for free download in the PDF format. Some also publish online editions in English.

Name	Province	Circulation	Founded	Website
Sierra Maestra	Santiago de Cuba	Weekly (on Saturdays)	7 September 1957	sierramaestra.cu
Adelante	Camagüey	Weekly (on Saturdays)	12 January 1959	adelante.cu
Guerrillero	Pinar del Río	Weekly	6 July 1960	guerrillero.cu
Girón	Matanzas	Weekly	5 December 1961	giron.cu
Venceremos	Guantánamo	Weekly (on Fridays)	25 July 1962	venceremos.cu
Vanguardia	Villa Clara	Weekly (on Saturdays)	9 August 1962	vanguardia.cu
Ahora!	Holguín	Weekly (on Saturdays)	19 November 1962	ahora.cu
Victoria	Isla de la Juventud	Weekly (on Saturdays)	20 February 1967	periodicovictoria.cu
La Demajagua	Granma	Weekly (on Saturdays)	10 October 1977	lademajagua.cu
Periódico 26	Las Tunas	Weekly (on Fridays)	26 July 1978	periodico26.cu
Escambray	Sancti Spíritus	Weekly (on Saturdays)	4 January 1979	escambray.cu
Invasor	Ciego de Ávila	Weekly (on Saturdays)	26 July 1979	invasor.cu
5 de Septiembre	Cienfuegos	Weekly (on Fridays)	5 September 1980	5septiembre.cu
Tribuna de La Habana	Havana	Weekly (on Sundays)	7 October 1980	tribuna.cu
El Artemiseño	Artemisa	Weekly (on Tuesdays)	11 January 2011	artemisadiario.cu
Mayabeque	Mayabeque	Weekly	11 January 2011	diariomayabeque.cu

== Defunct ==
Name	Headquarters	Circulation	Dates	Ref.
Gaceta de La Habana	Habana		1764	
Papel Periódico de La Habana			1790	
El Regañón			1800	
El Lince			1811	
El Lucero de la Habana (The Havana Star) *Merged with Noticioso Mercantil to become El Noticioso y Lucero de la Habana*	Havana		1813–1832	
Noticioso Mercantil (The Mercantile Seer) *Merged with El Lucero de la Habana to become "El Noticioso y Lucero de la Habana" *	Havana		1813–1832	
El Habanero	Havana		1824	
El Aurora			1828	
El Boletín Rotario de Jatibonico			1832–1961	
El Noticioso y Lucero de la Habana *renamed "Diario de La Marina" in 1844*	Havana		1832–1960	
Diario de la Marina	Havana		1832–1960	
La Voz del Pueblo Cubano			1852	
Correo de la Tarde (Havana)	Havana		1857-1858	
El Eco de Galicia (Havana)	Havana		1878-1902	
El Cubano Libre			1868	
El Dia				
El Diablo Cojuelo			1869	
La Lucha				
La Discusión			1889	
La Semana			1925-1935	
Havana Post	Havana			
El Eco Montañés				
Havana Daily Telegraph	Havana			
Havana Evening News	Havana			
Havaner lebn				
El Heraldo de Cuba				
La Nacion				
La Noche				
La Prensa				
El Triunfo				
Adelante				
Atenas				
Mañana				
Avance				
Hoy			1938	
Ecos de Jatibonico			1958	
Kubaner Idish Wort				
Lunes de Revolución			1959-1961	
El Mundo			1901-1969	
Patria				
El Veguero Libre			1945-1959	
Prensa Libre (Cuba)			1941-1961	
Revolución * "official Castro newspaper" until it merged with Hoy to form Granma*			1959-1965	

== Historical newspaper archives ==
- Archival issues of Diario de la Marina from the Digital Library of the Caribbean

== See also ==
- Unión de Periodistas de Cuba, journalists' union, est.1963
- Media of Cuba
- Television in Cuba
- Telecommunications in Cuba
- Internet in Cuba
- Censorship in Cuba

== Bibliography ==
- Charles L. Benjamin (February 15, 1905), "Daily Papers of Habana", Printers' Ink: a Journal for Advertisers, vol. 50, New York, pp. 40–48
- "Cuba", American Newspaper Annual, Philadelphia: N. W. Ayer & Son, 1908, hdl:2027/uiug.30112063602004 – via HathiTrust
- "Republica Cubana: Habana: Periodicos". Anuario del comercio, de la industria, de la magistratura y de la administracion de España, sus colonias, Cuba, Puerto-Rico y Filipinas, estados hispano-americanos y Portugal (in Spanish). Vol. 4. Madrid: Bailly-Bailliere e Hijos. 1908.
- J.W. Sanger (1919), "Publications in Cuba", Advertising Methods in Cuba, Special Agents Series, Washington DC: United States Department of Commerce, pp. 226 v, hdl:2027/nyp.33433023652054
- New York Public Library (1920), "Latin-American Periodicals Current in the Reference Department: Cuba", Bulletin, vol. 24, USA
- "Cuba", American Newspaper Annual, American newspaper annual and directory, Philadelphia: N. W. Ayer & Son, 1922, hdl:2027/umn.31951001295695n
- Waldo Lincoln (1926). "List of Newspapers of the West Indies and Bermuda in the Library of the American Antiquarian Society" (PDF). Proceedings. 36 (1). American Antiquarian Society: 139–142. "Cuba"
- "Cuba: Directory: the Press". Europa World Year Book. Europa Publications. 2003. p. 1338. ISBN 978-1-85743-227-5.
- Minerva Salado (2016). Censura de prensa en la Revolución cubana (in Spanish). Madrid: Editorial Verbum.
