= Mass media in Cuba =

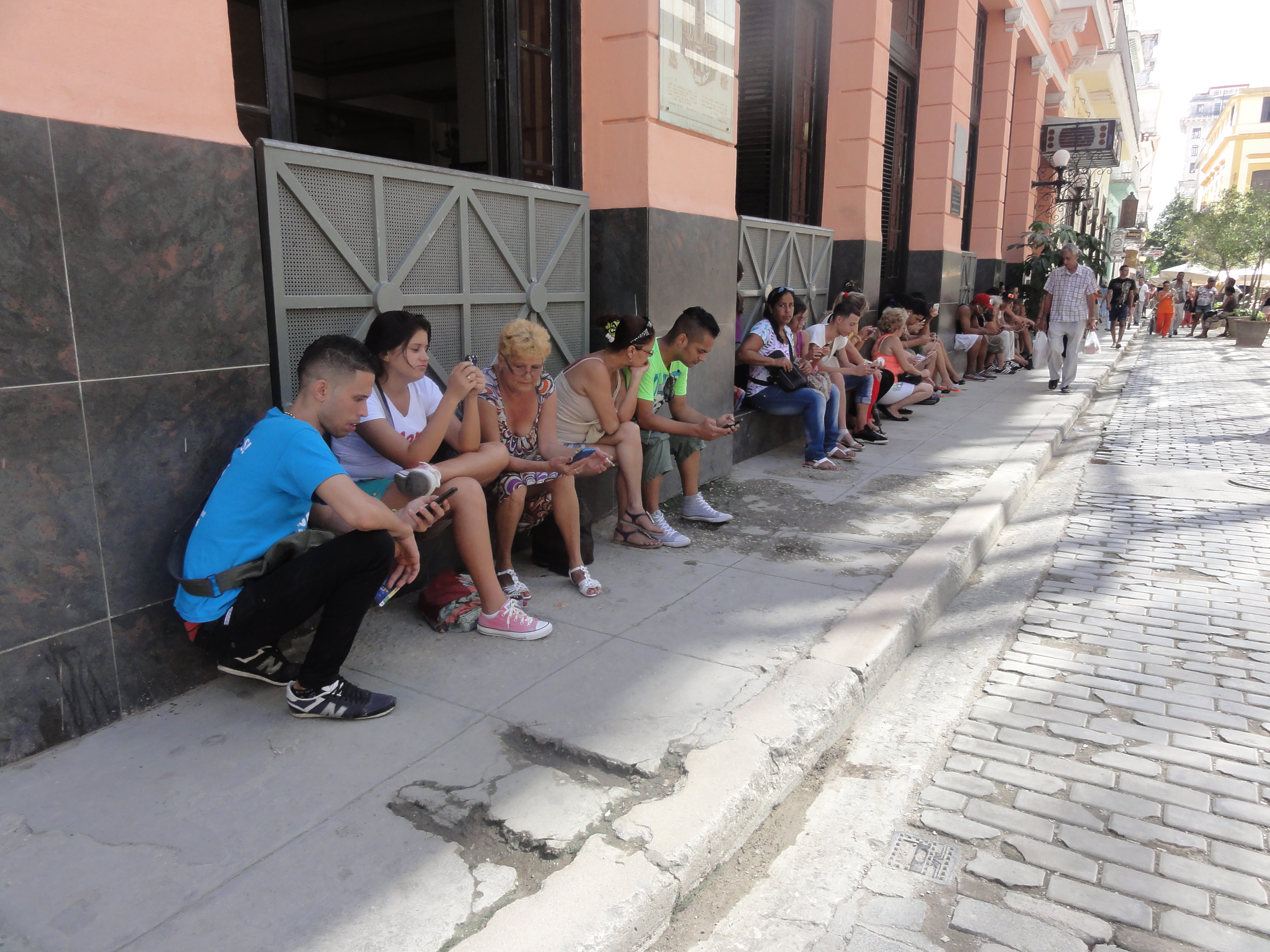
Users of a public WiFi hotspot in Havana, Cuba

The mass media in Cuba consists of television, radio, newspapers, and internet. The media are tightly controlled by the Cuban government, led by the Communist Party of Cuba (PCC) since 1959. The PCC strictly censors news, information and commentary, and restricts dissemination of foreign publications to tourist hotels. Journalists must operate within the confines of laws prohibiting anti-government propaganda and insulting officials, which carry penalties of up to three years in prison. Private ownership of broadcast media is prohibited, and all media outlets are state-owned.

== Newspapers ==
Cuba has several dozen online regional newspapers. The only national daily paper is Granma, the official organ of the PCC. A weekly version, Granma International, is published in English, Spanish, French, Portuguese, Turkish and German, available online. Havana residents also have their own weekly, Havana-oriented paper, Tribuna de La Habana. The weekly Juventud Rebelde is the official organ of the Communist Youth Union. The biweekly Bohemia is the country's only general-interest newsmagazine. Cuba's official news agency is Prensa Latina, which publishes several magazines, including Cuba Internacional, directed at the foreign audience.

Granma regularly features speeches by Raúl Castro and other leaders of the Cuban government, including former President Fidel Castro's column, "Reflexiones de Fidel" (Fidel's Reflections), official announcements of the Cuban government, popular sketches highlighting the history of Cuba's revolutionary struggle from the 19th to the 21st century, developments in Latin America and world politics, steps by Cuba's workers and farmers to defend and advance the socialist revolution, and developments in industry, agriculture, science, the arts, and sports in Cuba today.

The Prensa Latina was founded shortly after the Cuban Revolution. The agency was founded at the initiative of Ernesto Che Guevara similarly to Agencia Latina founded by Juan Perón in Argentina, to spread government ideology and neutralize American propaganda. The written press began in Cuba in 1764 with La Gazeta, followed by the Papel Periódico de La Habana (Havana Periodical Paper) in 1790. Cuba currently has several newspapers, including the following:

=== National circulation ===
Name	Headquarters	Circulation	Founded	Website
Granma	Havana	Daily (except on Sundays)	4 October 1965	granma.cu
Juventud Rebelde	Havana	Daily (except on Mondays)	21 October 1965	juventudrebelde.cu
Trabajadores	Havana	Weekly	6 June 1970	trabajadores.cu

=== Provincial circulation ===
Each of Cuba's 16 provinces has a regional weekly, which acts as the official newspaper published by each provincial Communist Party branch. The two most recently launched, El Artemiseño and Mayabeque, began publication in 2011, to serve the newly formed provinces of Artemisa and Mayabeque.

Each weekly has its own website with local news, updated daily, which offers weekly print editions for free download in the PDF format. Some also publish online editions in English.

Name	Province	Circulation	Founded	Website
Sierra Maestra	Santiago de Cuba	Weekly	7 September 1957	sierramaestra.cu
Adelante	Camagüey	Weekly	12 January 1959	adelante.cu
Guerrillero	Pinar del Río	Weekly	6 July 1960	guerrillero.cu
Girón	Matanzas	Weekly	5 December 1961	giron.cu
Venceremos	Guantánamo	Weekly	25 July 1962	venceremos.cu
Vanguardia	Villa Clara	Weekly	9 August 1962	vanguardia.cu
Ahora!	Holguín	Weekly	19 November 1962	ahora.cu
Victoria	Isla de la Juventud	Weekly	20 February 1967	periodicovictoria.cu
La Demajagua	Granma	Weekly	10 October 1977	lademajagua.cu
Periódico 26	Las Tunas	Weekly	26 July 1978	periodico26.cu
Escambray	Sancti Spíritus	Weekly	4 January 1979	escambray.cu
Invasor	Ciego de Ávila	Weekly	26 July 1979	invasor.cu
5 de Septiembre	Cienfuegos	Weekly	5 September 1980	5septiembre.cu
Tribuna de La Habana	Havana	Weekly	7 October 1980	tribuna.cu
El Artemiseño	Artemisa	Weekly	11 January 2011	artemisadiario.cu
Mayabeque	Mayabeque	Weekly	11 January 2011	diariomayabeque.cu

=== Role of the Church ===
Although the press is publicly owned, magazines and bulletins owned by the Catholic Church and other Christian denominations are also published and available to any Cuban citizen. In Havana, the Catholic Church publishes magazines such as Palabra Nueva and Espacio Laical monthly. In the diocese of Pinar del Río, Vitral is published bimonthly. These magazines and bulletins include religious instruction and news from the church. The bulletin with the highest circulation is Vida cristiana, published weekly in Havana; it reaches the majority of Catholics in the country. Today, the Church seeks to expand to different forms of media such as television and radio which it currently has no access.

== Radio ==
In 2005 Cubans had at least 3.9 million radio receivers, and the country had 169 AM, and 55 FM stations. The Cuban Institute of Radio and Television serves as the government's administrative outlet for broadcasting. Of the six national AM/FM radio networks, the top three are Radio Progreso, Radio Reloj, and Radio Rebelde, in that order. Two other national radio networks that also provide news and entertainment are Radio Musical Nacional (CMBF) and Radio Enciclopedia. Another station, Radio Taíno, promotes tourism. The Cuban government also operates Radio Havana, the official Cuban international short-wave radio service. Cuba's restriction of foreign broadcast media is one reason the U.S. government has sponsored radio broadcasting into Cuba through Radio y Televisión Martí, much of which is jammed.

=== Before the Cuban Revolution ===
Cuba was one of the first countries in the Americas to have radio service. In 1922, under the cooperation of the US-based International Telephone and Telegraph, the first radio station in the country (2LC) began broadcasts on 22 August. The radio stations in the country were developed by private initiatives, and its programming was initially based on news and entertainment.

Businessman Goar Mestre started construction of Radio Center, inspired by the Radio City in New York. Mestre began broadcasts on Channel 6 (CMQ) on December 18 of that year. Under Fulgencio Batista's dictatorship censorship was imposed. Radio's primary purpose in Cuba was to enhance the "high culture" education of the Cuban citizen.

Radio stations and networks included:

- Cadena Oriental de Radio
- Circuito Nacional Cubano (1954–1959)
- CMBF
- COCQ
- COCX
- Radio Mil Diez
- PWX (later CMQ)
- Radio Habana Cuba (RHC)
- Radio Progreso
- Radio Reloj (est. 1947)
- Sabates
- Union Radio (est. 1947)

=== During and after the Cuban Revolution ===
Soon after the Cuban Revolution in 1959, Fidel Castro's government applied a series of measures that transformed all national media. Rebelde, the first radio station developed under the revolution, started broadcasting on February 24.

During the early years of the revolution there was a division between the mainstream media in Cuba, created with private capital that opposed the new political situation. A series of small radio stations in favor of the new government, organized an "Independent Front of Free Broadcasters" (Spanish: Frente Independiente de Emisoras Libres). These radio stations were recognized as official by the new government. The government would develop a Bureau of Broadcasting under the political leadership of the PCC. Radio stations in the country were completely put under state control on May 24, 1962, under the management of the newly established Cuban Broadcasting Institute. Under the new broadcasting system, all media were to meet a set of values established by the government to strengthen the political process in the country, some names of radio stations were changed, and the coverage of radio services were extended to reach the whole country. In 1975, the agency changed its name to the Cuban Institute of Radio and Television.

=== Censorship ===
Cubans cannot watch or listen to independent, private, or foreign broadcasts. In 1963, using Soviet-supplied equipment, Cuba became the first nation in the Western Hemisphere to jam radio broadcasts, the apparent targets being the anti-Castro stations in the US.

=== Current radio channels ===
- Radio Rebelde – news, music, sport
- Radio Reloj – news
- Radio Habana Cuba – external, languages include Spanish, English, French, Portuguese
- Radio Progreso – entertainment

== Television ==
In 2005 Cubans had at least 3 million television sets, and the country had 58 TV broadcasting stations. The Cuban Institute of Radio and Television serves as the government's administrative outlet for broadcasting. The Cuban television system is made up of two networks: Cubavisión and Tele Rebelde. Cuba's restriction of foreign broadcast media is one reason the U.S. government has sponsored television broadcasting into Cuba through Radio y Televisión Martí, much of which is jammed.

=== Before the Cuban Revolution ===
Cuba was one of the first countries in the Americas to have television service. The popularity of radio led to the development and launch of television stations. The first years of television in Cuba were marked by a climate of competitiveness between two Cuban businessmen backed by US companies, Gaspar Pumarejo and Goar Mestre. Mestre started construction of Radio Center, inspired by the Radio City in New York, while Pumarejo tried to develop a television studio in his own home. Pumarejo's channel (Unión Radio Televisión) was the first TV channel to start broadcasts in the island; it began broadcasting on 24 October 1950 with an address by President Carlos Prío Socarrás from the Presidential Palace. Mestre began broadcasts on Channel 6 (CMQ) on December 18 of that year. Telenovelas, news, cooking shows, and comedy groups were shown. After Union Radio TV went on the air, Cuban demand for television sets soared. Under Fulgencio Batista's dictatorship censorship was imposed. Television's primary purpose in Cuba was to enhance the "high culture" education of the Cuban citizen.

=== During and after the Cuban Revolution ===
Soon after the Cuban Revolution in 1959, Fidel Castro's government applied a series of measures that transformed all national media. Television channels in the country were completely put under state control on May 24, 1962, under the management of the newly established Cuban Broadcasting Institute. Under the new broadcasting system, all media were to meet a set of values established by the government to strengthen the political process in the country, some names of TV stations were changed, and the coverage of the TV services were extended to reach the whole country. In 1975, the agency changed its name to the Cuban Institute of Radio and Television.

=== TV channels ===
- Cubavision
- Portal de la TV Cubana ←

== Internet ==
Sources of independent news about Cuba can be found on the Internet. They include La Nueva Cuba, founded in 1998, Havana Times, founded in 2008 and edited in Nicaragua, and 14ymedio, founded in 2014. Another, El Toque won some awards for its coverage in 2023, along with editor-in-chief José J. Nieves. Its coverage has been criticized by the Cuban government.

Cuba has one of the lowest Internet circulation rates in the Western hemisphere. The Cuban Internet is characterized by a low number of connections, limited bandwidth, censorship and high cost. The Internet in Cuba stagnated since its introduction in 1996 due to several factors:

- a lack of funding due to the devastation of Cuba's economy after the fall of the Soviet Union
- the U.S. embargo which delayed construction infrastructure and made equipment expensive and difficult to obtain
- tight government restrictions which identified the Internet as a tool for subversion of the Cuban Revolution

Starting in 2007 this situation began to improve — Internet remains illegal in private homes but government-owned internet cafes offer Internet access. 118 cybercafes operate in Cuba. In 2015, the government opened the first public wifi hotspots in 35 public locations and reduced prices and increased speeds for Internet access in cybercafes.

=== Censorship ===
The Cuban internet is among the most tightly regulated in the world. All content is subject to review by the Department of Revolutionary Orientation. At Internet cafes Cuban citizens have to give their name and address. All material intended for publication on the Internet must be approved by the National Registry of Serial Publications in advance. One report found that many foreign news outlet websites are not blocked in Cuba, but the slow connections and outdated technology in Cuba makes it impossible for citizens to load these websites. Rather than having complex filtering systems, the government relies on the high cost of getting online and the telecommunications infrastructure that is slow to restrict Internet access. Reports have shown that the Cuban government uses Avila Link software to monitor citizens use of the Internet. The government has obtained citizens usernames and passwords in order to closely monitor emails.

Dissidents accuse the government of not providing affordable home internet access for political reasons. The Cuban government blames the US for the poor state of telecoms infrastructure, which it says is caused by the American economic embargo imposed in the 1960s.

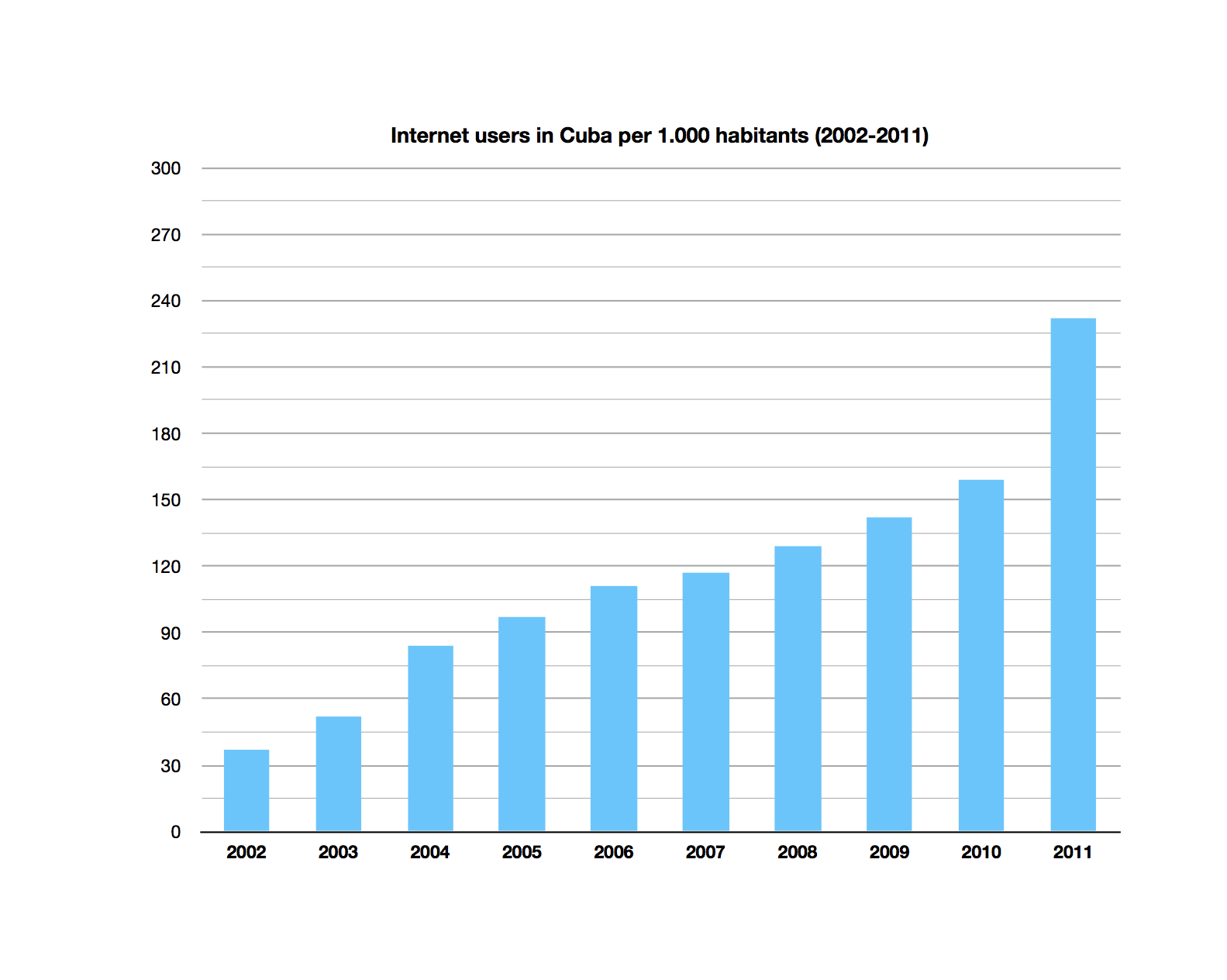
Internet users in Cuba per 1,000 inhabitants (2002–2011) according to Cuban state statistics ONE

In recent times, censorship of the Internet has slowly relaxed. In 2007, it became possible for members of the public to legally buy a computer. Since June 4, 2013 Cubans can sign up with ETECSA, the state telecom company, for public Internet access at 118 centers across the country. The government approved wifi hotspots which were opened in 2015 give largely unfettered internet access and access to social media sites such as Facebook and Twitter; however, opposition sites are blocked. The cost of the new access at $4.50 an hour is still high in a country where state salaries average $20 a month. As of 2016, only 5% of Cubans enjoy web access at home.

==== Circumventing censorship and controversies ====
Citizens have developed numerous techniques to circumvent the government's control of the Internet. Some get online through embassies and coffee shops, or purchase accounts through the black market. The black market consists of professional or former government officials who have been cleared to have Internet access who sell or rent their usernames and passwords to citizens who want to have access. Bloggers and dissidents also use USB keys to get their work published by giving their pieces to people who have an easier time getting online, who then upload their items from the USB.

These USB sticks are known as "El Paquete Semanal" or weekly package noting their frequency of distribution across the Island. A paquete contains 1 terabyte of data filled with anything from pirated foreign television, music videos, apps, news, and other digital media content otherwise inaccessible to the Cuban population. Paquetes cost around 5 Cuban Pesos or about 20 US cents making them much a much more reliable and economical way to consume media. They are also largely tolerated, so long as they do not contain pornography or political dissent although the latter requirement is often broken.

In 2006, Guillermo Fariñas, a Cuban psychologist, independent journalist, and political dissident, held a seven-month hunger strike to protest Internet censorship in Cuba. He ended it in the autumn of 2006, due to severe health problems. He stated that he was ready to die in the struggle against censorship.

Alan Gross, an American government contractor under employment for the U.S. Agency for International Development, was arrested in Cuba on December 3, 2009, and was convicted on March 12, 2011, for covertly distributing laptops and cellphones on the island.

== See also ==
- Decree 349 – Cuban law restricting artistic expression
- Telecommunications in Cuba
- Human rights in Cuba
- Cinema of Cuba
- Cuban Institute of Radio and Television
- Independent digital media in Cuba

== Bibliography ==
- Jorge L. Marti (1945). "Press in Cuba: Its 'Rebirth' Since 1939". Journalism & Mass Communication Quarterly. 22 (2): 124–129. doi:10.1177/107769904502200203. S2CID 164794135.
- John A. Lent (1985). "Cuban Mass Media after 25 Years of Revolution". Journalism & Mass Communication Quarterly. 62 (3): 609–615. doi:10.1177/107769908506200322. S2CID 143822032.
- James W. Carty Jr. (1990). "Mass Media in Cuba". In Stuart H. Surlin; Walter C. Soderlund (eds.). Mass Media and the Caribbean. New York: Gordon and Breach. pp. 131–148. ISBN 978-2-88124-447-6.
- Michael Salwen (1994). Radio and Television in Cuba: The Pre-Castro Era. Iowa State University Press. ISBN 0813821800.
- Oscar Luis Lopez (2002) [1981]. La radio en Cuba (in Spanish) (3rd ed.). Havana: Letras Cubanas. OCLC 55706108.
- Christopher H. Sterling, ed. (2004). "Cuba". Encyclopedia of Radio. New York: Fitzroy Dearborn. pp. 689+. ISBN 978-1-135-45648-1.
