= Vanguardia =

Vanguardia may refer to:

== Newspapers ==
- La Vanguardia, the leading daily newspaper in Catalonia, Spain
- La Vanguardia (Argentina), an Argentine newspaper
- Vanguardia (Colombian newspaper), a Colombian regional newspaper
- Vanguardia (Cuban newspaper), a Cuban newspaper
- Vanguardia (Málaga), newspaper of the Communist Party of Spain

== Other uses ==
- La Vanguardia Airport, an airport in Colombia
- Vanguardia de la Ciencia, a Spanish science podcast and radio program
- Vanguardia Awards, annual prizes awarded by La Vanguardia in Barcelona, Spain, since 2023
- Vanguardia, a type of Cuban art

== See also ==
- Vanguard (disambiguation)
- Cerro Vanguardia Mine, a gold and silver mine in Argentina
