= Internet in Cuba =

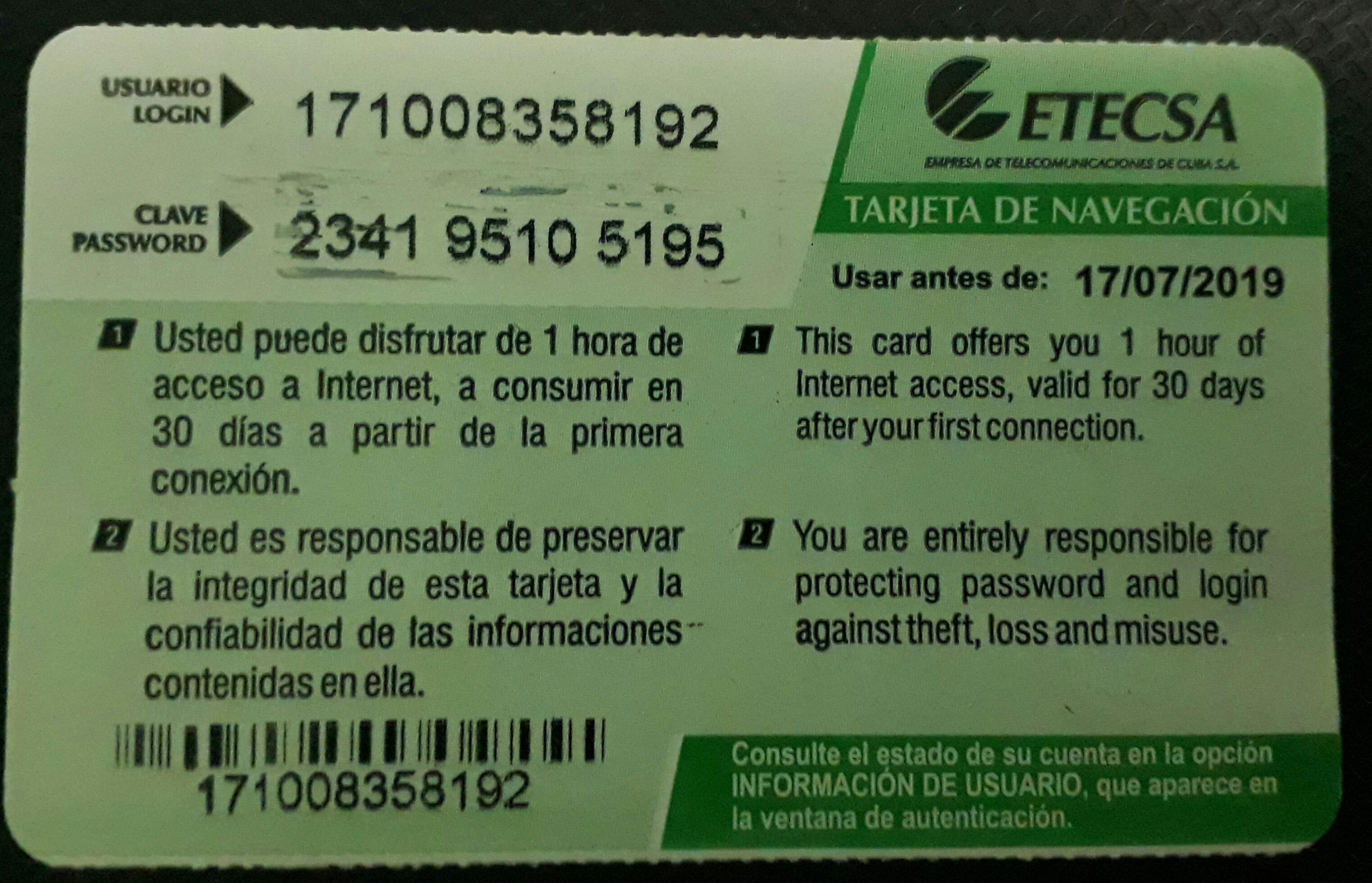
1 hour internet access card from ETECSA

The internet in Cuba covers telecommunications in Cuba including the Cuban grassroots wireless community network and Internet censorship in Cuba.

Since its introduction in the late 1990s, Cuban Internet has stalled because of lack of funding, tight government restrictions, and the U.S. embargo, especially the Torricelli Act. Starting in 2007 this situation began to slowly improve, with 3G data services rolling out island-wide in 2018, and 4G since 2019, albeit through a government-monitored network. On July 29, 2019, Cuba legalized private WiFi in homes and businesses. According to website DataReportal, in 2022, 68% of the Cuban population had access to the Internet.

== History ==
In September 1996, Cuba's first connection to the Internet, a 64 kbit/s link to Sprint in the United States, was established. After this initial introduction, the expansion of Internet access in Cuba stagnated. Despite a lack of consensus on the specific reasons, the following appear to be major factors:

- Lack of funding, owing to the poor state of the Cuban economy after the fall of the Soviet Union and the Cuban government's fear that foreign investment would undermine national sovereignty (in other words, foreign investors putting Cuba up for sale).
- The U.S. embargo, which delayed construction of an undersea cable, and made computers, routers, and other equipment prohibitively expensive and therefore difficult to obtain.
- According to Boris Moreno Cordoves, Deputy Minister of Informatics and Communications, the Torricelli Act (part of the United States embargo against Cuba) identified the telecommunications sector as a tool for subversion of the 1959 Cuban Revolution, and the necessary technology has been conditioned by counter-revolutionaries. The internet is also seen as essential for Cuba's economic development.

In 2009, President Obama announced that the United States would allow American companies to provide Internet service to Cuba, and U.S. regulations were modified to encourage communication links with Cuba. The Cuban government rejected the offer, however, preferring to work instead with the Venezuelan government. In 2009 a U.S. company, TeleCuba Communications, Inc., was granted a license to install an undersea cable between Key West, Florida and Havana, although political considerations on both sides prevented the venture from moving forward.

About 30 percent of the population (3 million users, 79th in the world) had access to the internet in 2012. Internet connections are through satellite leading the cost of accessing the internet to be high. Private ownership of a computer or cell phone required a difficult-to-obtain government permit until 2008. When buying computers was legalized in 2008, the private ownership of computers in Cuba soared—there were 630,000 computers available on the island in 2008, a 23% increase over 2007). Owing to limited bandwidth, authorities gave preference to use from locations where Internet access is used on a collective basis, such as in workplaces, schools, and research centers, where many people have access to the same computers or network.

The ALBA-1 undersea fiber-optic link to Venezuela was laid in 2011 and became operational for public users in January 2013. This replaced a system which relied on the Intersputnik satellite system and aging telephone lines connecting with the United States. Total bandwidth between Cuba and the global internet before the cable was just 209 Mbit/s upstream and 379 downstream.

In 2015, the Cuban government opened the first public wi-fi hotspots in 35 public locations. It also reduced prices and increased speeds for internet access at state-run cybercafés. As of July 2016, 4,334,022 Cubans (38.8% of the total population) were Internet users.

By January 2018, there were public hotspots in approximately 500 public locations nationwide providing access in most major cities, and the country relies heavily on public infrastructure whereas home access to the Internet remains largely inaccessible for the general population. In 2018, the state announced a plan to start offering mobile Internet by the end of the year. That began in December 2018, and during 2019, limited 4G coverage began.

The 2,500-kilometre ARIMAO undersea cable reached land on January 10, 2023, in Martinique, after starting its installation in Cienfuegos, Cuba. The Cuban Telecommunications Company S.A. (ETECSA) and the French company Orange S.A. cooperated in laying the cable.

== Status ==
On July 29, 2019, Cuba legalized private Wi-Fi in homes and businesses, although one must obtain a permit to have access.

As of December 6, 2018, Cubans can have full mobile Internet access provided by Cuba's telecommunications company, ETECSA, at 3G speeds. The roll out of the internet service took place from Thursday, December 6, to Sunday, December 9 to avoid congestion. ETECSA also announced different internet packages and their prices, ranging from 600 MB for 7 Cuban convertible pesos ($7) to 4 GB for 30 Cuban convertible pesos ($30).

One network link connects to the global Internet and is used by government officials and tourists, while another connection for use by the general public has restricted content. Most access is to a government-controlled national intranet and an in-country e-mail system. The intranet contains EcuRed and websites that are supportive of the government. Such a network is similar to the Kwangmyong used by North Korea, a network Myanmar uses and a network Iran has plans to implement.

Starting on 4 June 2013 Cubans can sign up with ETECSA, the state telecom company, for public Internet access under the brand "Nauta" at 118 centers across the country. The Juventud Rebelde, an official newspaper, said new areas of the Internet would gradually become available.

In early 2016, ETEC S.A. began a pilot program for broadband Internet service in Cuban homes, with a view to rolling out broadband Internet services in private residences. And there are approximately 250 WiFi hotspots around the country.

In mid December 2016 Google and the Cuban government signed a deal allowing the internet giant to provide faster access to its data by installing servers on the island that will store much of the company's most popular content. Storing Google data in Cuba eliminates the long distances that signals must travel from the island through Venezuela to the nearest Google server.

Since 2018, access to the Internet by mobile data is available. In 2019, 7.1 million Cubans could access the Internet. The prices of connections, since WiFi zones, or mobile data, or from houses through the "Nauta Hogar" service have been decreasing, especially since the economic reform of January 2021, when all the salaries increased by at least 5 times, and the prices of the Internet remain in the same point. In 2021, 7.7 million Cubans accessing the Internet were reported.

== SNET ==
SNET (from Street Network) is a Cuban grassroots wireless community network which allows people to play games or pirate movies by using an interconnected network of households.

In May 2019, Cuba's Ministry of Communication (MINCOM) announced resolutions that made community networks like SNET illegal. Since SNET was the world's largest community network that did not have Internet access, implementation of the resolutions was postponed for 60 days for negotiations between SNET administrators and MINCOM. The negotiations have ended with a decision to transfer SNET's services and content to ETECSA, Cuba's government-monopoly ISP, and to provide access through Cuba's nationwide chain of 611 Youth Computer Clubs (YCCs).

== Censorship ==
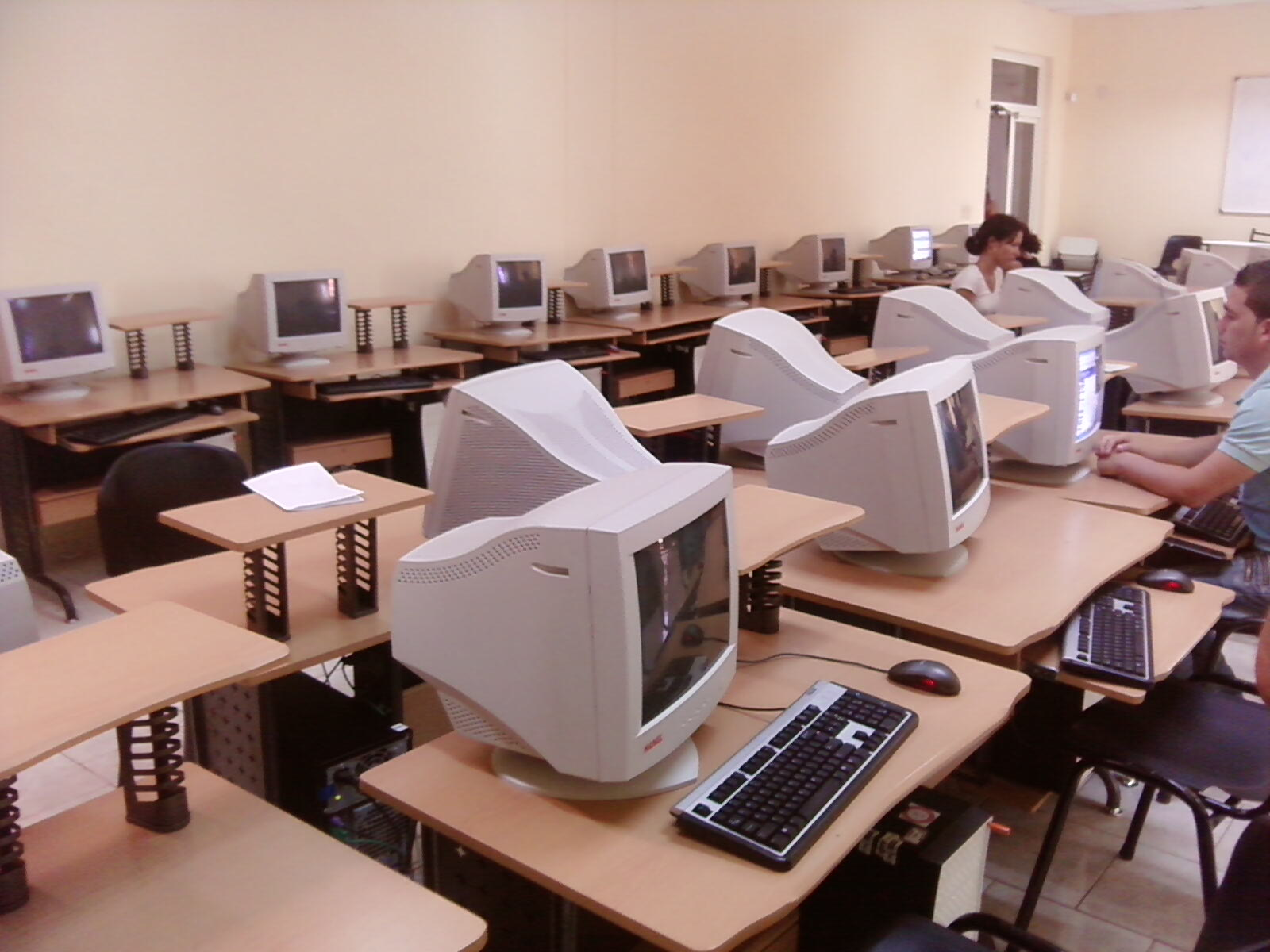
The computer lab of the University of Information Science in Havana, one of the major computer centers in Cuba. (2010)

The Cuban internet is among the most tightly controlled in the world. In 2004 the International Federation of Library Associations and Institutions expressed deep concern about continuing violations of the basic human right to freedom of access to information and freedom of expression in Cuba. Cuba has been listed as an "Internet Enemy" by Reporters Without Borders since the list was created in 2006. The level of Internet filtering in Cuba is not categorized by the OpenNet Initiative due to lack of data.

All material intended for publication on the Internet must first be approved by the National Registry of Serial Publications. Service providers may not grant access to individuals not approved by the government. One report found that many foreign news outlet websites are not blocked in Cuba, but the slow connections and outdated technology in Cuba makes it impossible for citizens to load these websites. Rather than having complex filtering systems, the government relies on the high cost of getting online and the telecommunications infrastructure that is slow to restrict Internet access.

Digital media is starting to play a more important role, bringing news of events in Cuba to the rest of the world. In spite of restrictions, Cubans connect to the Internet at embassies, Internet cafés, through friends at universities, hotels, and work. Cellphone availability is increasing. Cuba has also seen a rise in the community of bloggers. Bloggers such as Yoani Sánchez use new media to depict life in Cuba and how the government violates basic freedoms. Sánchez's blog Generation Y has received much international publicity. Moreover, Sánchez along with other popular bloggers have made it "trendy" for youth to "exercise the right to free speech". New media tools have allowed citizens to record and post their protests on YouTube as well as text message Tweets to people outside of Cuba.

The rise of digital media in Cuba has led the government to be increasingly worried about these tools; U.S. diplomatic cables leaked in December 2010 revealed that US diplomats believed that the Cuban government is more afraid of bloggers than of "traditional" dissidents. The government has increased its own presence on blogging platforms with the number of "pro-government" blogging platforms on the rise since 2009.

In order to get around the government's control of the Internet, citizens have developed numerous techniques of Internet censorship circumvention. In addition to getting online through coffee shops, Cubans also purchase accounts through the black market. The black market consists of professional or former government officials who have been cleared to have Internet access. These individuals sell or rent their usernames and passwords to citizens who want to have access.

The mobile internet in Cuba being provided by ETECSA, Cuba's telecommunications company, is mostly uncensored. However, a few sites funded by the U.S. government are blocked.
