= Internet censorship in Cuba =

The Cuban government directly prevents access to websites critical of the government, pro-democracy sites, and sites covering human rights issues in Cuba.

- Cuba was listed as "not free" in the Freedom on the Net 2018 report from Freedom House, with an overall score of 79 out of 100 where 100 is the least free. This is the fifth highest score out of the 65 countries ranked, below China, Iran, Syria, and Ethiopia. Cuba had been listed as "not free" each year since the reports started in 2009.
- Cuba has been listed as an "Internet Enemy" by Reporters Without Borders since the list was created in 2006.
- The level of Internet filtering in Cuba is not categorized by the OpenNet Initiative due to lack of data.

== Background ==
=== Surveillance and self-censorship ===
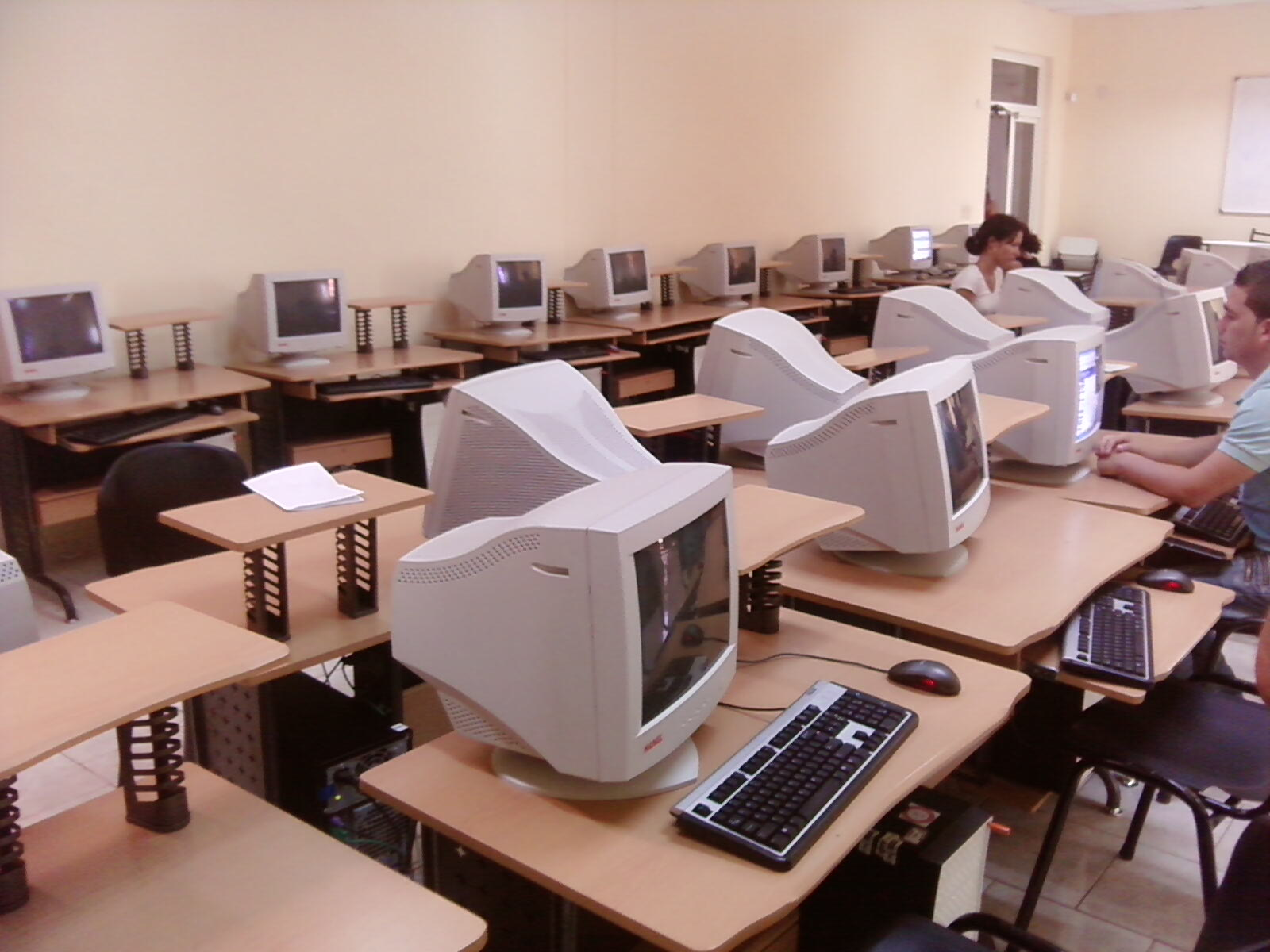
The computer lab of the University of Information Science in Havana, one of the major computer centers in Cuba in 2010.

Reports have shown that the Cuban government uses Avila Link software to monitor citizens' use of the Internet. By routing connections through a proxy server, the government is able to obtain citizens' usernames and passwords. Cuban ambassador Miguel Ramirez has argued that Cuba has the right to "regulate access to [the] Internet and avoid hackers, stealing passwords, [and] access to pornographic, satanic cults, terrorist or other negative sites".

Reporters Without Borders suspects that Cuba obtained some of its internet surveillance technology from China, which has supplied other countries such as Zimbabwe and Belarus. Cuba does not enforce the same level of internet keyword censorship as China.

=== Limited access to the Internet ===
All material intended for publication on the Internet must first be approved by the National Registry of Serial Publications. Service providers may not grant access to individuals not approved by the government. One report found that many foreign news outlet websites (including YouTube, Google, Pinterest, Fandom, DeviantArt, Scratch, Facebook etc.) are not blocked in Cuba, but the slow connections and outdated technology in Cuba makes it impossible for citizens to load these websites.

Because of limited bandwidth, authorities give preference to developing internet infrastructure in locations where the Internet can be accessed on a collective basis, such as in work places, schools, and research centers, where many people have access to the same computers or network.

Despite these limitations, Internet access is seen as essential for Cuba's economic development. Roughly 4.5 million people or about 39% of the population had access to Internet in 2018, up from 1.6 million in 2008. There were 1.2 million computers available on the island in 2018, up from 630,000 in 2008.

=== Limitations despite increased Internet access ===
In 2007, it became possible for members of the public to legally buy a computer. Digital media is starting to play a more important role, bringing news of events in Cuba to the rest of the world. In spite of restrictions, Cubans connect to the Internet at embassies, Internet cafés, through friends at universities, hotels, and work. As telecommunication infrastructure develops, cellphone availability is increasing. Starting on 4 June 2013 Cubans could sign up with Etecsa, the state telecom company, for public Internet access at 118 centers across the country. Juventud Rebelde, an official newspaper, said new areas of the Internet would gradually become available.

Despite increasing access the government still has a history of limiting access to the internet. Alan Phillip Gross, under employment with a contractor for the U.S. Agency for International Development, was arrested in Cuba on 3 December 2009 and was convicted on 12 March 2011 for covertly distributing laptops and cellular phones on the island, and released in 2014. The rise of digital media in Cuba has led the government to be increasingly worried about these tools; leaked U.S. diplomatic cables revealed that US diplomats believed that the Cuban government is more afraid of bloggers than of "traditional" dissidents. The government has increased its own presence on blogging platforms with the number of "pro-government" blogging platforms on the rise since 2009.

The Cuban government has reportedly shut off Internet and mobile service in response to recent protests and unrest. For example, in July 2021, during the largest protests since 1959, Cuban officials restricted Internet access to WhatsApp, Telegram, Signal, and other communication platforms.

As of November 2024 there is large concern with geoblocking taking place within Cuba, calling it "Digital Discrimination".

== State control of telecommunications ==
Access to the internet in Cuba is controlled by the Empresa de Telecomunicaciones de Cuba S.A. (ETECSA), a state-owned monopoly. Access to the internet is granted through temporary or permanent accounts which last 30 days and 360 days, respectively. Temporary accounts are mostly used by foreign tourists, while permanent accounts are mostly used by Cuban citizens. Although an estimated 32.5% of the population had access to the internet as of 2017, the vast majority of those people only have access to the intranet that is offered by the government. The intranet includes access to an email service that can be used within the country, educational and cultural materials that are provided largely by government institutions, state-sponsored media links, and some foreign websites that demonstrate support for the Cuban government. The most popular sites that are offered through the intranet service include EcuRed, a Wikipedia-like service that is offered in Spanish that attempts to "create and disseminate knowledge from a decolonizing point of view". The percentage of the population that has access to the global internet is far smaller at only 5% of the population in 2014.

Cuba does not have the infrastructure and individuals have insufficient incomes to make home Wi-Fi broadly available, thus most Cubans access Wi-Fi through public means including the "ParkNets" and the Joven Club. The ParkNets are public Wi-Fi hotspots often located in parks where the vast majority of Cubans go for Wi-Fi access. There are 421 public Wi-Fi hotspots in all of Cuba, and 68 of those hotspots are located in the capital city of Havana. Most Wi-Fi is accessed by Cubans is in these public areas, as a result Cubans overwhelmingly access the internet through mobile devices, with among the most popular apps in Cuba being communication apps Facebook Messenger and WhatsApp which are often used to contact family that is living abroad. The other method through which Cubans access the internet is the Joven Clubs, or Youth Club, which are government-provided computer centers where the public can access both the intranet and internet by providing identification. By using identification codes for every person that accesses the internet, the government is likely able to track the online behavior of everyone that is using the internet which may result in some degree of self-censorship in the population.

== Cost of Internet access ==
Until 2018, two kinds of online connections are offered in Cuban Internet cafes: a 'national' one that is restricted to a simple intranet service operated by the government, and an 'international' one that gives access to the entire Internet. The general population can access the former for .10 CUC an hour, while the later costs 1.50 CUC an hour. Most people in Cuba are paid a salary of $25 per month by the Cuban government, and even people who are employed by foreign firms still only make a salary of $30 per month. With such low incomes and the relatively expensive cost of internet, most Cubans who access the internet are motivated to use the lower cost Cuban intranet rather than the global internet. This means that of the Cubans who are able to access the internet, most of them are accessing the content that is either created directly by the government or curated by the government and far more highly censored than the global internet. The cost of internet access restricts access to the internet and limits access to the global internet even if the local intranet is accessible.

Until 2018, Residential internet is also very expensive at 15 CUC per month for the cheapest plan and 70 CUC per month for the plan that offers the fastest quality internet. These services represent a cost that is excess of the majority or all of the salary of the vast majority of the Cuban population. Similarly, internet for businesses is out of reach for all but the most wealthy customers with monthly costs that are at least 100 CUC a month for direct access to the global internet for the slowest service and at a maximum of over 30,000 CUC a month for the fastest service that is offered. As a result, the vast majority of Cuban residences and businesses do not have access to the internet.

Since 2018, the prices of access to the Internet began to decrease. For 2021, one hour to access Internet through public Wi Fi cost 1.50 CUP. Access to the national network, 0.50 CUP. The minimum data mobile package down to 110 CUP by 600 Mbs and a bonus for 4G lines, combining also messages and calls. Since 2018, access to the Internet by mobile data is available. In 2019, 7.1 millions of Cubans could access the Internet. The prices of connections, since WiFi zones, or mobile data, or from houses through the "Nauta Hogar" service have been decreasing, specially since the economic reform of January 2021, when all the salaries increased by at least 5 times, and the prices of the Internet remain in the same point. In 2021, 7.7 millions of Cuban people accessing the Internet were reported.

=== El Paquete ===
In an attempt to deliver media to the Cuban public without unreliable digital means, some Cubans have gone as far as hand delivering content to the user through the use of portable hard drives. This allows individuals to avoid having to use internet circumvention tools altogether and presents a more straight forward approach to gathering content for those who are not as technically adept or do not have the resources to gather content from the internet. El Paquete Semanal, or the weekly package in English, is the local name for the digital content that is delivered to Cuba on a weekly basis. The content that is delivered through El Paquete consists of a variety of digital media, including music, television shows, movies, news articles, foreign software, and mobile applications. This media is delivered to a computer owned by a local vendor in Cuba and then sold to Cuban citizens who come and download the content that they would wish to consume from a computer onto a USB to use in their own homes. The content of El Paquete is often entertainment and information driven rather than an attempt to smuggle in content that is explicitly negative towards the Cuban government. El Paquete forms a sort of crude offline internet where the Cuban population can gain access to a tremendous amount of digital content despite the lack of information technology infrastructure within the country.

However, since the availability of mobile data (2018) and better prices, most of Cuban access Internet and its contents more easily, so, "El paquete" has lost relevance.

=== StreetNets (SNet) ===
StreetNets is a name used to refer to the local mesh networks that are built by Cuban citizens in order to connect localities to a private network that is outside of the view of the government and can operate in a way that is completely uncensored. Members of the mesh networks are able to communicate online privately with one another and share files through the network without fear of government oversight or censorship. The mesh network is formed by a series of Wi-Fi antennas and Ethernet cables that are connected to one another and are able to bring hundreds of computers onto a single network. It is estimated that over 9,000 computers in the capital city of Havana are connected to some form of a mesh network as of 2001, Business Insider claims it to be 9000 in 2015 but this is likely just outdated or misinterpreted information, and it had an estimated 50,000 daily users as of 2019 even after Cuban citizens got access to the worldwide internetas of 2026 the SNet in its original form has been absorbed into the government run monopoly ISP ETECSA loosing its decentralized nature. As mentioned above, all internet is controlled by the ETECSA, so ownership of Wi-Fi equipment privately without the consent of the government is illegal without a license from the Ministry of Communications this is not the case anymore as it was legalized in May 2019 for domestic users, if it includes several homes or links to multiple points outside than the network administrator must obtain a license for 10 Cuban Pesos and is valid for 5 years there is also a license for if a device if outside the home as long as it does not block public roads that costs 10 Cuban Pesos and is valid for 2 years both of these also have the limitation that they can't be uses on devices exceeding 100 mW. However, the government has not taken much action to attempt to shut down the SNet until may 2019 where SNet and other similar community run intranets were made illegal due to the ban on radio amplifiers, the 100 mW limit and the ban on outdoor cabling especially that of which runs over public roads, likely because there is strong self-censorship by the community to the extent that if anyone posts pornographic material or discusses politics, they are permanently blocked from using the network. Due to the government forcefully absorbing the SNet into ETECSA many Cubans began a peaceful protest on Facebook and Twitter using the hashtag #YoSoySnet attempting to show that the SNet was peaceful due to its self moderation but it didn't succeed so many citizens staged sit-ins outside the MINCOM headquarters in Havana after a petition to reverse the changes failed. In attempt to resolve the protests the Cuban Government got security forces to interrogate and threaten prominent SNet administrators and present an ultimatum which was to either to transfer the entirety of SNet's infrastructure to Joven Club de Computación (Youth Computer Clubs,), a Cuban state company that offers courses and access to Internet to all the Cuban population, which is completely managed by the Cuban Government or have all of the equipment confiscated, forcing SNet moderators to accept the deal. The Cuban Government also attempted to cover this up by threatening journalists who reported on this and people posting about it on social media, 20 have been victims of 3,000-peso fines which is triple the average salary in Cuba and not paying results in six months in prison. Both the SNet and El Paquette are largely self censored because of the value that Cubans place on accessing the content and their unwillingness to face backlash by the government, potentially risking losing access to the content.

== See also ==
- Internet censorship and surveillance by country
- Censorship in Cuba
- Human rights in Cuba
- Internet in Cuba
