= Invasor =

Invasor may refer to:

- Invasor (film), a 2012 Spanish-French action thriller
- Invasor (newspaper), a Cuban newspaper
- Invasor (horse), an Argentine racehorse

== See also ==
- Invader (disambiguation)
