= La Demajagua =

Demajagua or La Demajagua may refer to:

Places

- Demajagua, a barrio in the municipality of Fajardo, Puerto Rico
- La Demajagua, Isle of Youth, a village in the Isle of Youth, Cuba
- La Demajagua (memorial), a historical memorial related to the Ten Years' War near Manzanillo, Cuba

Other

- La Demajagua (newspaper), a Cuban newspaper
- The flag of La Demajagua, a historical revolutionary flag of Cuba still in use as its naval jack.
