= Ahora =

Ahora, Spanish for "now", may refer to:

- Ahora (newspaper), a Cuban Spanish-language weekly
- Ahora, Turkey, now Yenidoğan, a village in Turkey

== Music ==
- "Ahora" (J Balvin song), 2018
- Ahora (Chiquis Rivera album) or the title song, 2015
- Ahora (Christian Nodal album) or the title song, 2019
- Ahora (Fiskales Ad-Hok album), 2000
- Ahora, an album by Fabiana Cantilo, 2011
- Ahora, an album by Melendi, 2018
- Ahora, an album by Pedro Aznar, 2012
- Ahora, an album by Reik, 2019
- Ahora, an album by Rosa López, 2003

== See also ==
- Ahora Es (disambiguation)
