= Venceremos =

Venceremos is a Spanish and Portuguese word meaning "we will overcome", or "we will win".

Venceremos may refer to:

- Venceremos, a battle cry and the name of several republican newspapers during the Spanish Civil War
- Venceremos (newspaper), a daily newspaper published in Guantánamo, Cuba
- Venceremos Brigade, a socialist organization that sends annual work brigades to Cuba
- Venceremos (political organization), a Chicano radical group of the late 1960s and early 1970s in the United States, based in Northern California and unrelated to the Veneceremos Brigade
- Radio Venceremos, an FMLN guerrilla group's radio station during the El Salvador Civil War

== Music ==
- "Venceremos" (song), written by Claudio Iturra and Sergio Ortega for the 1970 election campaign of Salvador Allende
- Venceremos, a 2022 album by Karamelo Santo
- "Venceremos (We Will Win)", a 1984 song by Working Week
- "Venceremos - Wir werden siegen", a 2002 song by Die Toten Hosen from Auswärtsspiel
- "Venseremos" - a 1988 song by Turkish/Kurdish group Grup Yorum
