= Guerrillero =

Guerrillero may refer to:

- A member of a guerrilla group
- Guerrillero (newspaper), a Cuban newspaper
