= ARIMAO (cable system) =

ARIMAO communications cable between Cuba and Martinique

The ARIMAO submarine fiber optic cable is designed and deployed to improve internet connectivity between the islands of Cuba and Martinique.

== History ==
The cable's deployment began on December 8, 2022, from the tricontinental port in Cienfuegos, Cuba. The cable is named after the nearby Arimao River that flows close to the city of Cienfuegos.

The announcement was made by the president of the Cuban telecommunications company, ETECSA S.A, Tania Velázquez Rodríguez.

The cable-laying ship Pierre de Fermat started installation from Cienfuegos and reached Martinique by sea on January 9, 2023. It has an approximate length of 2,470 km.

The project is the result of cooperation between the Cuban company ETECSA S.A and the French company Orange S.A. It will improve the availability of internet access on the island. This cable adds to other telecommunications projects such as the ALBA-1 cable, a cooperation project between Cuba and Venezuela.
