= Ahora Es =

Ahora Es may refer to:

- "Ahora Es", slogan of Danilo Medina, President of the Dominican Republic
- "Ahora Es" (song), 2008
- "Ahora Es", a 1995 song by 2 in a Room

== See also ==
- Ahora (disambiguation)
