= El Sueño de Arquímedes =

- El Sueño de Arquímedes.
- Genre: Talk Radio / Podcast
- Running time: 50 minutes
- Country of origin: Spain
- Language: Spanish
- Home station: Radio Nacional de España
- Created by: Ángel Rodríguez Lozano
- Original release: August, 2006 – June, 2007
- No. of episodes: 41
- Website: www.vanguardia.rne.es

El Sueño de Arquímedes was a Spanish science podcast and radio program which was broadcast by Radio Nacional de España (RNE) from September 2006 until June, 2007. The program was created by Ángel Rodríguez Lozano. A total of 35 programs are still available for download. In addition to El Sueño de Arquímedes, Ángel Rodríguez Lozano also hosted Vanguardia de la Ciencia, which was broadcast weekly without interruption from April 1995 until June 2007. The name of the program means "the dream of Archimedes", and alludes to Archimedes' statement that given a lever and a fixed point, he could move the world. To Ángel Rodríguez Lozano, the dream was moving the world by popularizing and sharing knowledge.

== Format ==
Before the startup of El Sueño de Arquímedes, Ángel Rodríguez Lozano had been hosting Vanguardia de la Ciencia for more than a decade. When RNE asked if he would host a second popular science program, Ángel Rodríguez Lozano realised that the scheduled timing, Sundays between 3 and 4 p.m, meant that it would be sandwiched between sports broadcasts. Therefore, he would have to capture the attention of listeners who were not looking for this type of program. The intention was therefore to make the program even more accessible than Vanguardia de la Ciencia, with shorter interviews and more music. Ángel Rodríguez Lozano stated that it had been a marvellous experience, and that the response had been tremendous.

The program included science news, interviews, and biographies of great scientists, written by Carmen Buergo. In the final, humorous section of the program, Ángel Rodríguez Lozano paid a visit to the archetypical mad scientist Alejandro Laguna, who supposedly lived and worked in a hidden laboratory in the basements of Radio Nacional de España, seven floors below ground level. Alejandro would demonstrate one of his latest inventions, which usually defied the laws of physics, and Ángel played the role of a rather gullible spectator. Alejandro then explained the physics of the corresponding real-world device. Finally, the demonstration of his invention usually had some highly unpleasant consequence for Ángel.

== Termination of El Sueño de Arquímedes ==
In June 2007, El Sueño de Arquímedes and Vanguardia de la Ciencia were abruptly terminated. In the correspondence section of one of the last programs of Vangurardia de la Ciencia, Ángel Rodríguez Lozano explained, in response to a letter from an outraged listener, that the decision to terminate the program was made due to a re-structuration of RNE, and that he was but one of 4,150 employees who had to leave. In the previously referenced interview, he explained that everyone older than 52 years had to retire early, and that he was 54 years old at the time.

The decision to terminate the programs was widely criticized in Spanish-speaking blogs.

== Available programs ==
At the web-site of RNE, 36 programs are still available.
