= Kentik =

American Internet measurement company

- Formerly: CloudHelix
- Type: Private
- Industry: Internet
- Founded: 2014; 12 years ago in San Francisco, California, United States
- Founders: Avi Freedman; Ian Applegate; Ian Pye; Justin Biegel
- Successor: Infoblox
- Headquarters: San Francisco, California, United States
- Area served: Worldwide
- Key people: Avi Freedman; Doug Madory
- Website: kentik.com

Kentik is an American network observability, network monitoring and anomaly detection company headquartered in San Francisco, California.

== History ==
Kentik was founded in 2014 as CloudHelix by co-founders Avi Freedman, Ian Applegate, Ian Pye, and Justin Biegel. The company changed its name to Kentik in 2015. Kentik was acquired by Infoblox in July 2026.

== Technology ==
Kentik's Network Observability Cloud is a software-as-a-service (SaaS) product that ingests NetFlow and other network data and analyzes it to provide network monitoring and anomaly detection services for the operators of internet-connected networks. Kentik's underlying data engine is a clustered datastore modeled on Dremel. The engine collects and correlates live operational data from Internet routers and switches to produce network activity and health information.

== Analysis ==
Since November 2020, Kentik has been the organizational home of Doug Madory's Internet routing analysis practice, previously associated with Renesys and Renesys' subsequent acquirers DynDNS and Oracle. While employed by Kentik, Madory discovered the Global Resource Systems IP address hijacking which occurred during the final hours of the Trump administration and was the first to accurately quantify the 2021 Facebook outage, the largest communications outage in history.
