= Ángel Rodríguez Lozano =

Spanish radio journalist and popularizer of science

Ángel Rodríguez Lozano is a Spanish radio journalist and popularizer of science, best known as the creator and presenter of the program Vanguardia de la Ciencia, which was broadcast without interruption every week from April 1995 until June 2007.

Before the startup of Vanguardia de la Ciencia, he participated in other programs in Radio Nacional de España. He has also contributed to other programs of popular science, El Mono Temático, En Clave de Ciencia de Radio 5, and Hora América. From August 2006 to June 2007, he also wrote and presented the program El Sueño de Arquímedes. Ángel Rodríguez Lozano was born in 1952 in the small municipality of La Garrovilla, near Mérida in Extremadura. He is a physicist by training, and has done research work in fluid dynamics, chaos theory and non-linear phenomena at the Complutense University of Madrid. Ángel Rodríguez Lozano has stated that he enjoys popularizing science, because the effort that is required to present a scientific topic helps him put the concepts straight, and gain a deeper understanding of the subject matter.

Ángel Rodríguez Lozano left Radio Nacional in June, 2007, because of a re-structuration of the company, which involved the early retirement of employees older than 52 years.

== cienciaes.com ==
In 2009, Ángel Rodríguez launched the web site "cienciaes.com" (Ciencia para escuchar - science for listening). The site contains audio files about science. It is divided into the sections "Hablando con cientificos" (interviews with scientists), "ciencia y genios" (biographies of scientists), "zoo de fosiles" (paleontology), "la ciencia nuestra de cada dia" (the science of everyday phenomena) and "Ulises y la ciencia" (reflections on scientific themes). In addition, some episodes of Vanguardia de la Ciencia and El sueno de Arquimedes, previously aired by RNE, are available for download. All the contents of Cienciaes.com are licensed under a Creative Commons license.
