= Circuito Nacional Cubano =

Havana; Cuba
- Broadcast area: Cuba
- Frequency: See Frequencies
- Branding: CMW

Programming
- Languages: Cuban Spanish
- Subchannels: See Frequencies
- Affiliations: See Frequencies

Ownership
- Sister stations: See Frequencies

History
- First air date: March 1, 1954
- Last air date: January 12, 1959
- Former names: RHC-Cadena Azul (1939-52); Cadena Azul de Cuba (1952-54)
- Call sign meaning: CMW (AM); COCY (SW)

Technical information
- Power: See Frequencies
- Translator(s): See Frequencies
- Repeater(s): See Frequencies

Circuito Nacional Cubano (English: Cuban National Network), was a radio station broadcasting from Havana, Cuba, owned by several shareholders, including Fulgencio Batista (the President of the Republic of Cuba), it is heard on 590 kHz AM in Havana and region, being retransmitted throughout Cuba. The station broadcast for 4 years, between 1954 and 1959, until it was confiscated by the new government after being used as propaganda by the deposed President Fulgencio Batista in the civil war.

== History ==
=== 1954 a 1959 ===
The RHC-Cadena Azul station closed on March 1, 1954, due to debts incurred by its owner.

Between 1957 and 1958, the CNC broadcast a unique fictional simulation under the title El Dictador de Valle Azul (English: The Dictator of Valle Azul) written by Francisco Pazos, produced and directed by José Arbesú, starring Rolando Leyva (in the role of Taguary), who Many have heard about the events during the Cuban civil war (at that time, there was no term "Cuban Revolution") against Fulgencio Batista, accused of ruling Cuba in a dictatorial manner since the 1952 coup d'état.

=== 1959: End of CNC ===
On January 12, 1959, by Resolution of the Minister of the Interior, Commander Luis Orlando Rodríguez, the new government installed after the Civil War, the Circuito Nacional Cubano (CNC) and the 12 national radio stations were intervened due to the actions of this national radio network we will belong to 98% of the deposed president Fulgencio Batista y Zaldívar (who fled the country 12 days before).

The designated interveners were the members of the July 26 Movement, Armando León Acosta and Francisco Vilalta Cañadilla, workers of the CNC who were responsible for the cells of the Movement during the insurrectionary struggle on this national channel.

== Frequencies ==
The Circuito Nacional Cubano (CNC) covered most of Cuba through broadcasters that retransmitted their signal in cities and regions directly from Havana until its end.

Location	Call sign	Power [kW]	Frequency
La Habana (Havana)	CMW	25000	590
La Habana (Havana)	COCY	1000	11740
Pinar del Río	CMAN	1000	840
Matanzas	CMGF	250	930
Jovellanos	CMGN	500	960
Santa Clara	CMHI	10000	570
Ciego de Ávila	CMJM	500	840
Camagüey	CMJN	5000	960
Holguin	CMKV	10000	600
Santiago de Cuba	CMKN	1000	930
Guantánamo	CMDN	250	1000

== Bibliography ==
- Jiménez Soler, Guillermo. Las empresas de Cuba 1958. Editorial de Ciencias Sociales. 5ta edición. La Habana. 2014.
