= Kubaner Idish Wort =

- Editor: Ch. Novomodny, M. Epstein
- Founded: 1942
- Ceased publication: 1950
- Political alignment: Communist
- Language: Yiddish
- Headquarters: Havana

Kubaner Idish Wort (Yiddish: קובאנער אידיש װארט, 'Cuban Jewish Word') was a communist Yiddish-language newspaper published from Havana, Cuba 1942–1950. In the beginning it was a semi-monthly, whilst as of the late 1940s it was published semi-weekly. Kubaner Idish Wort was published by the communist-oriented Folks-tzenter ('People's Centre'). It was initially edited by Ch. Novomodny, and at a later stage by M. Epstein.
