= La Nueva Cuba =

Online Cuban newspaper

La Nueva Cuba (LNC) is the first independent Cuban daily online newspaper, founded on November 1, 1998. LNC started as a weekly online newspaper until it turned daily in January 1999. LNC is published by the Independent Press Info Group Corporation - a non-profit incorporated in Washington, D.C.
