= Vanguardia (Málaga) =

Vanguardia ('Vanguard') was a weekly newspaper published from Málaga, being the provincial organ of the Communist Party of Spain. The first issue was published on 10 May 1936. Vanguardia was one of a number of Andalusian provincial communist newspapers founded after the Popular Front victory in the 1936 elections. The publication of Vanguardia continued until the capture of Málaga by Francoist forces in February 1937.
