= Telecommunications in Cuba =

Telecommunications in Cuba consists mainly of NTSC analog television, analog radio, telephony, AMPS, D-AMPS, and GSM mobile telephony, and the Internet. Telephone service is provided through ETECSA (Telecommunications Company of Cuba), mobile telephone service is provided through the Cellular Telephone Company of Cuba (CUBACEL) and, previously, Caribbean Cellular (Celulares del Caribe, C-COM - no longer operating). Cuba's main international telecommunications links are through Intersputnik, with limited effectiveness of undersea telephone cables to the Americas, Spain, and possibly Italy due to underdevelopment.

== Telephone ==
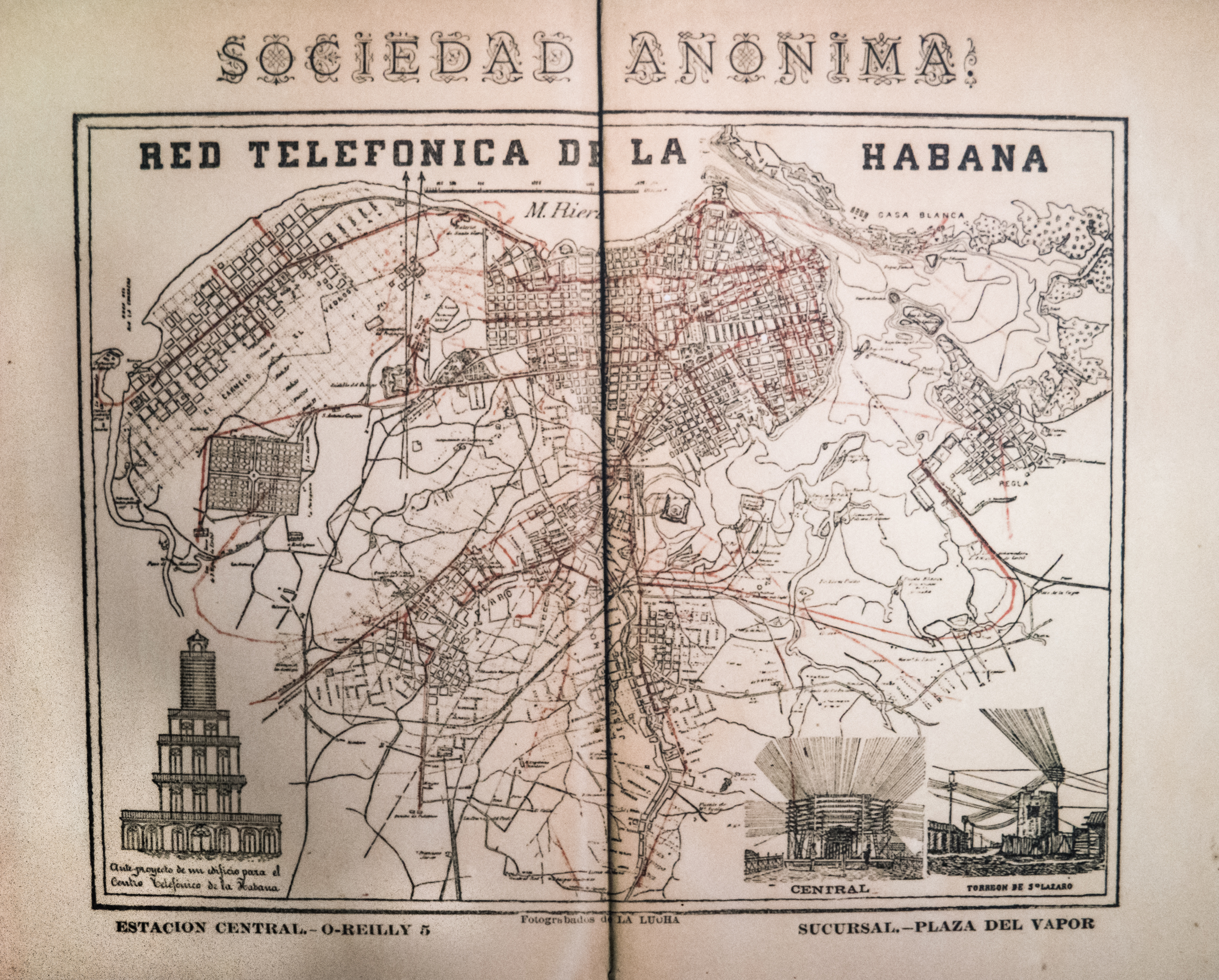
An 1895 map of the first telephone network in Havana, Cuba on display in the ETECSA Telephone Museum.

Country code: +53

International call prefix: 00

(https://it.granma.cu/cuba/2019-04-26/etecsa-installera-il-codice-daccesso-00)

Telephones – main lines in use: 1.2 million, 72nd in the world, less than 10 per 100 inhabitants (2009).

Telephones – mobile cellular: One million mobile phones at the end of 2010 (9 per 100 inhabitants), up from 621,000 in 2009 and 330,000 in 2008, when all Cubans were allowed to buy and use them for the first time. Mobile-cellular telephone service is expensive, which limits subscribership. By the end of 2020, Etecsa announced that they had 6.661 million mobile telephone users of whom 4.421 million had Internet.

Telephone system: 95% of telephone switches were digitized by end of 2006. The principal trunk system is coaxial cable; fiber-optic distribution is used in Havana and on Isla de la Juventud; two microwave radio relay installations (one is old, US-built; the other newer, Soviet-built); both analog and digital mobile cellular service established; one international satellite earth station, Intersputnik (Atlantic Ocean region).

New fiber-optic link: A new undersea fiber-optic link with Venezuela was scheduled for 2011. In May 2012 there were reports that the cable was operational, but with use restricted to Cuban and Venezuelan government entities. Internet access by the general public still used the slower and more expensive satellite links, until January 2013 when Internet speeds increased.

== Radio ==
Radio broadcast stations: 6 national radio networks, an international station, and many local radio stations. All state-owned and operated by the Cuban Radio and Television Corporation (ICRT), which manages Radio Rebelde, the largest AM network, and the SW service Radio Habana Cuba. Radio Marti, based in Miami, Florida, and financed by the United States government, transmits Spanish-language radio broadcasts to Cuba.

Radios: 3.9 million, 64th out of 188 in the world (1997)

== Television ==
Television broadcast stations:

Four national TV networks and many local TV stations. All state-owned and operated by the Cuban Radio and Television Corporation (ICRT). TV Marti, based in Miami, Florida, and financed by the United States government, transmits Spanish language TV broadcasts to Cuba. The American Forces Network (AFN) has a station intended for U.S. military personnel at Guantanamo Bay Naval Base.

Televisions:

2.64 million, 54th out of 185 in the world (1997)

== Internet ==
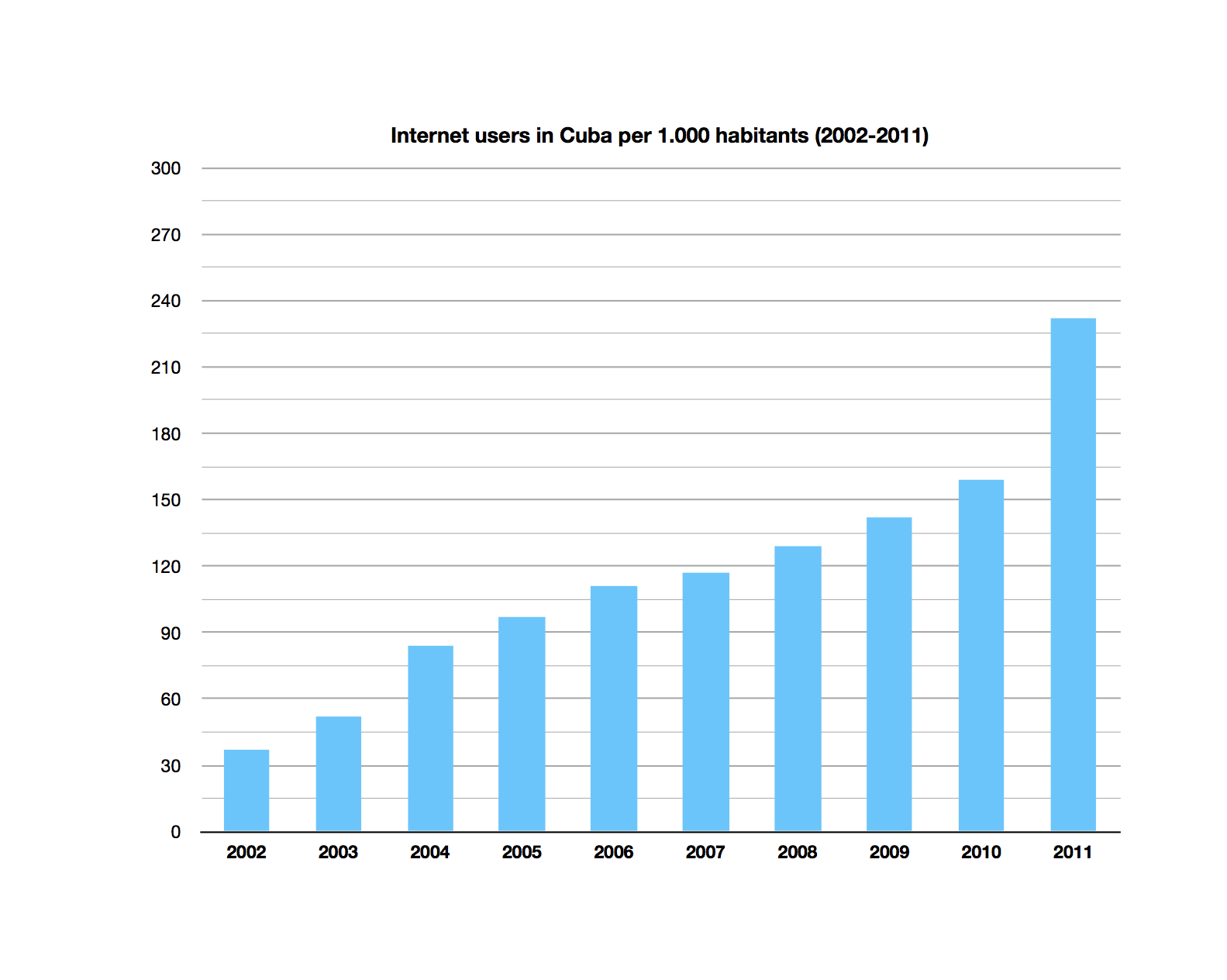
Internet users in Cuba per 1,000 inhabitants (2002-2011) according to Cuban state statistics ONE

Internet users: total: 6,353,020 percent of population: 57.15% (July 2018 est.) Ranking 76th in the world for total users.

Internet service providers (ISPs): Empresa de Telecomunicaciones de Cuba S.A (ETECSA)

Top-level domain: .cu

Access to the Internet was heavily controlled, and all e-mails are closely monitored.

The Cuban authorities have called the Internet "the great disease of 21st century" due to 'counter-revolutionary' information being available on a number of websites, some of which are official news sites. As a result of computer ownership bans, computer ownership rates were among the world's lowest. However, since buying a computer was legalized in 2007, the ownership of computers in Cuba soared, dramatically increasing the number of Internet users. But, the rates still remained quite low, partially due to the high costs of systems and Internet usage per hour in contrast to the average monthly wage.

In 2019, ETECSA began offering Internet connection via Cubacel mobile telephones which was increased with 4G. In March 2021, they announced that 4G had reached every municipality in the country.

== See also ==
- Internet in Cuba
- Caribbean Media Corporation
- Media of Cuba
