= Vanguardia de la Ciencia =

Spanish science radio program and podcast

- Genre: Talk Radio / Podcast
- Running time: 50 minutes
- Country of origin: Spain
- Language: Spanish
- Home station: Radio Nacional de España
- Created by: Ángel Rodríguez Lozano
- Original release: April 1995 – June 2007
- No. of episodes: 655

Vanguardia de la Ciencia was a Spanish science podcast and radio program which was broadcast on the shortwave band by Radio Exterior de España, one of the stations of Radio Nacional de España (RNE). The program aired weekly, without interruption, from April 1995 until June 2007. It was available for download as mp3-files from the web pages of RNE from September 2003. The program was created by Ángel Rodríguez Lozano. A total of 98 programs are still available online. In addition to Vanguardia de la Ciencia, Lozano also hosted another popular science radio program and podcast, El Sueño de Arquímedes.

== History ==
Vanguardia de la Ciencia had a large audience worldwide. Although exact numbers of downloads and listeners are unavailable, Radio exterior de España has 80 million listeners, only surpassed by the BBC and Radio Vaticana. In addition, Vanguardia de la Ciencia was retransmitted by several radio stations in Latin America and Spain. The program was popular throughout the Spanish-speaking world.

In June 2007, Vanguardia de la Ciencia and El sueño de Arquímedes were abruptly terminated. In the correspondence section of one of the last programs, Lozano explained, in response to a letter from an outraged listener, that the decision to terminate the program was made due to a re-structuration of RNE, and that he was but one of 4,150 employees who had to leave. In the previously referenced interview, he explained that everyone older than 52 years had to retire early, and that he was 54 years old at the time. The decision to terminate the programs was widely criticized in Spanish-speaking blogs.

== Format ==
The program aimed at being accessible to everyone with an interest for science. Some basic knowledge of science was required to get the most it, as it often went into some technical detail, especially in the interviews. The audio production was of top quality.

- Science news. The program started with a review of scientific news.
- Interviews. The news section was usually followed by an in-depth interview with a Spanish-speaking scientist, focusing on a recent publication in a major scientific journal.
- Biographies. The biography of a great scientist was often included. These were written by Carmen Buergo. They were written in the first person, and usually set at a point in time when the scientist was old, and told the story of his or her life and achievements.
- Letters from Ulises. Many of the programs included a section called "Cartas de Ulises" (Letters from Ulises). Ulises was presented as a friend of the program, who acted as a correspondent. His letters often started with stories from his childhood in rural Spain, which illustrated a scientific concept. In some of the programs, this section was more frivolous, such as when Ulises travelled in time, and performed an interview with Lucy, with simultaneous translation to Spanish. The contributions of Ulises were not credited, but in an interview at dimetu.com, Ángel Rodríguez Lozano revealed that Ulises, in fact, was himself, and that the stories were inspired by people and events from his own childhood.
- Correspondence. Near the end of the program, Ángel Rodríguez Lozano read a letter from a listener. The letters have included questions about permission to redistribute the audio. These have consistently been answered that the audio is freely redistributable, both by individuals and radio stia nuestra de cada dia (everyday science).
- Everyday science. In the section La ciencia nuestra de cada dia, Ángel Rodríguez Lozano answered questions from listeners, requesting explanations of observations of natural phenomena and curious observations. Often, a question was read one week, and answered the next, and it was evident that much research had been put into giving a thorough answer.

== Cienciaes.com ==
After the closure by RNE of the radio programs Vanguardia de la Ciencia and El sueño de Arquímedes, Lozano created the website "Cienciaes.com" (Ciencia para escuchar) in 2009. There, the "Vanguardia de la ciencia" podcast is continued, along with several other Spanish-language science podcasts.

== See also ==
- El Sueño de Arquímedes
- Radio Nacional de España
- Ángel Rodríguez Lozano
