= Workers' Central Union of Cuba =

Trade union federation of Cuba

CTC
- Workers Central Union of Cuba
- Central de Trabajadores de Cuba
- Founded: 1939
- Headquarters: Havana, Cuba
- Location: Cuba
- Members: 4,000,000
- Key people: Ulises Guilarte de Nacimiento, General Secretary.
- Affiliations: WFTU
- Website: www.cubasindical.cu

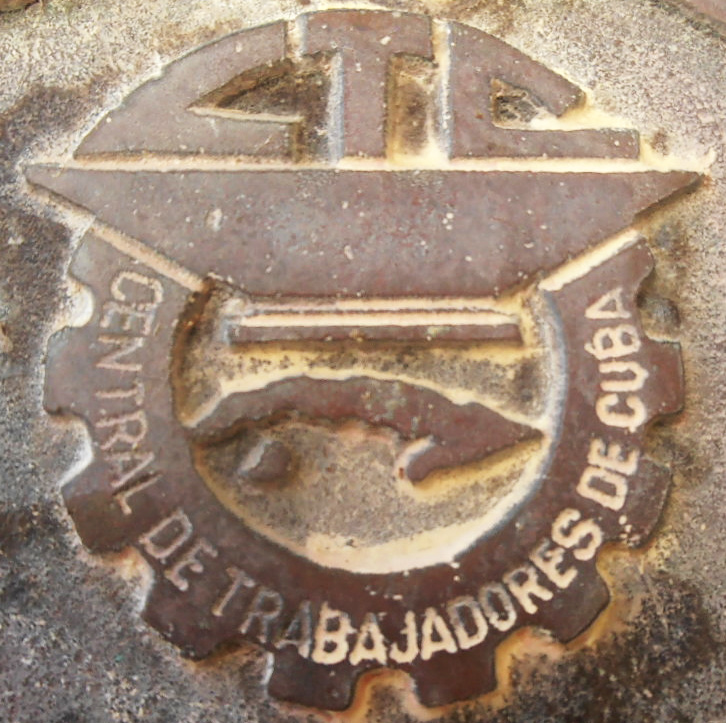
Artwork (relief)

The Workers Central Union of Cuba (Spanish: Central de Trabajadores de Cuba, CTC) is the trade union federation in Cuba. It originated as the Confederación de Trabajadores de Cuba (Confederation of Cuban Workers) in 1939 and changed its name to the Central Union of Cuban Workers in 1961.

The CTC unites 19 sectoral unions, organised in more than 81,000 workplaces, with elected municipal, provincial and national committees for each union, with all Cuban workers belonging to this trade union federation. The CTC also has a weekly newspaper, Trabajadores.

== The early years: 1938-1959 ==
In the 1930s, the Cuban labor movement declined after an unsuccessful general strike against a government headed by Carlos Mendieta who initiated a period of harsh, anti-union persecution. By the late 1930s, some Communist labor leaders reportedly supported Fulgencio Batista in exchange for the legalization of the Communist party and reorganization of the labor movement. This change in the labor movement was capped with the establishment of the Confederation of Cuban Workers, or CTC, in 1938. The CTC was founded after the second Congreso Obrero Latinoamericano, held from 23 to 28 January 1939 in Havana and the Constituent Congress of the Confederation of Cuban Workers. The Congress was attended by some 1,500 delegates from 700 mass organizations. The Congress elected Lázaro Peña, a leading communist trade union activist, secretary general of the CTC.

By the mid-1940s, many Cuban workers were unionized and covered by collective agreements; by the late 1940s, Communists lost control of the CTC, with their influence in the trade union movement gradually declining into the 1950s. In the late 1940s, the government of Ramón Grau San Martín orchestrated a split of the CTC which forced out the communist leadership that had included sugar workers' union leader Jesús Menéndez and longshoremans' union leader Aracelio Iglesias, both murdered by suspected government agents. During the dictatorship of Fulgencio Batista the CTC was led by Batista supporter Eusebio Mujal.

The coup by Batista in 1952, and the years until 1958, placed tremendous strain on the labor movement, with some union leaders resigning from the CTC in opposition to Batista. By 1958, the labor movement was a powerful force in Cuban society, with union members reaching nearly one million, or one in five workers. After the Cuban Revolution in January 1959, the CTC was brought in line under the auspices of the Cuban Communist Party with those in the leadership of the CTC becoming more supportive of the country's government after purges and reported marginalization of certain individuals. The Cuban government fundamentally changed the nature of unions in Cuba, with production standards issued in 1960, minimum output levels and collective work requirements for enterprises set and government advisory councils which dealt with worker discipline, safety and health, and working conditions established, intended to take the place of independent trade unions.

Lázaro Peña returned from exile in Mexico to assume leadership of the new CTC. During this time, communists remained "on the fringes of the revolution" and didn’t start negotiations with Castro until the spring of 1958 when the defeat of Batista was inevitable, with the Communist Party, participating in the government and gaining power over the labor unions through its control of the Cuban Confederation of Workers. The original leaders of the organization, such as anti-communist labor leader Eusebio Mujal, secretary general of the CTC from 1947 to 1959, were forced to flee after the seizure of power by Cuban revolutionary forces, led by Fidel Castro, in 1959. Mujal, who had been a representative to the Constituent Assembly that drafted the Constitution of 1940 would later help found a group of Cuban workers in exile in the United States.

== Role in Cuban society since 1959 ==
Throughout its history, the CTC always incorporated the vast majority of Cuban workers, making it the largest single national organization by membership, both before and after the Cuban Revolution. In November 1959, the CTC withdrew from the anti-Communist Inter-American Regional Organization of Labor. In October 1964, there was a reported split in the CTC between "new" and "old guard" Communists.

After 1976, when the new Constitution of Cuba was adopted, popular participation through government-approved organizations such as the CTC was encouraged. Since then, the union has stayed an ally of the Cuban government, with the latter arguing that when it listens to this union, it is "hearing all legitimate voices".

On April 27, 1996, the CTC held its 17th National Congress, which culminated in a march in Havana on May 1, May Day, or International Workers' Day. Delegates to the conference focused on economic changes in recent years, especially efforts to overcome the economic crisis brought on by the demise of the Soviet Union, formerly Cuba's main trading partner. Additionally, unionists from other countries were invited guests, with activists from the United States part of a delegation of the U.S.-Cuba Labor Exchange. The Cuban union movement encompassed, at the time, over 97 per cent of Cuba's workers and worked closely with the governing Cuban Communist Party.

In the 21st century, the CTC continued its role in Cuban society. Pedro Ross Leal, then the General Secretary, described the organization as "class conscious", distinguishing them "from other international working associations." He also argued that "the methods of struggle have changed, we must know the role played by the social and political character-institutionalized masses...in Cuba everything improves and will continue to improve...I emphasize that Fidel's Cuba will be a worthy host of the XV World Union Congress." Four years later, in 2009, a dissident was arrested for organizing a union which was not connected the CTC. The following year, Salvador Valdes Mesa, secretary-general of CTC, then representing 3 million workers, the only Cuban labor union allowed in the country, wrote that "reorganization" in Cuba will "ensure redundant workers are reassigned rather than fired". In 2012, CTC leader Salvador Valdés Mesa refused to raise salaries for Cuban workers.

In November 2017, the US Government prohibited financial transactions, specifically "gifts" from those in United States to the secretaries and first secretaries of the Confederation of Labor of Cuba (CTC) and its component unions. Around the same time, members of the WFTU, including one from the CTC, visited Athens, talking about "the long lasting history and solidarity of WFTU to the Cuban people". Apart from this, the WFTU has held "solidarity" events for the "heroic people of Cuba", advocating to "stop to the blockade against Cuba" and to return "the territory of Guantanamo to the Cuban people". This included "internationalism and solidarity with the Cuban Revolution" with some trade union meetings even held in Havana.

In December 2017, the CTC's General Secretary, Ulises Guilarte de Nacimiento sent a message to the Cuban people and workers a few days from the 59th anniversary of the Revolution. He also mentioned the young workers whom he described as those who will "continue and guarantee the Revolutionary process", calling on them "to be protagonists of the work underway in the Caribbean nation".

== See also ==
- List of trade unions
- List of federations of trade unions
