= Young Communist League (Cuba) =

Youth organization of the Communist Party of Cuba

Young Communist League Unión de Jóvenes Comunistas
- Secretary General: Aylín Álvarez Garcia
- Founded: 4 April 1962
- Headquarters: Havana
- Membership: 800,000+
- Ideology: Communism; Marxism–Leninism; Castroism; Anti-imperialism; Internationalism
- Position: Far-Left
- Mother party: Communist Party of Cuba
- International affiliation: WFDY
- Newspaper: Juventud Rebelde

The Young Communist League (Spanish: Unión de Jóvenes Comunistas, UJC) is the youth organization of the Communist Party of Cuba. Its membership is voluntary and selective. The organizations counts more than 800,000 active members. Its symbol shows the stylized faces of Julio Antonio Mella, Camilo Cienfuegos and Che Guevara. The motto is Estudio, Trabajo, Fusil and means "Study, Work, Rifle".

== History ==
The Cuban Young Communist League came into existence along with the Communist Party of Cuba on April 4, 1962.

== Organization ==
Aylín Álvarez Garcia is the First Secretary of the organisation. The UJC is a member organization of the World Federation of Democratic Youth. The 11th and 14th World Festival of Youth and Students were hosted in Cuba by the organization. The UJC publishes the daily newspaper Juventud Rebelde (Rebellious Youth) throughout Cuba. Members are expected to support the organization by donating 2% of their income monthly.

== See also ==
- José Martí Pioneer Organization
