= Girón (newspaper) =

- Available in: Spanish
- Website: www.giron.co.cu

Girón is the official Cuban newspaper of the provincial committee of the Cuban Communist Party in Matanzas. It is published in Spanish.
