= ALBA-1 =

Submarine communications cable

- Owners: Telefónica
- Landing points: 1. La Guaira (Venezuela); 2. Siboney (Cuba); 3. Ocho Rios (Jamaica)
- Technology: Glass Fiber

ALBA-1 is a submarine communications cable for telecommunications between Cuba and Venezuela.

The fiber cable was laid by the Venezuelan government in 2010 and 2011. After an unexplained dormancy of two years, Doug Madory's Internet routing analysis revealed that it was activated on Tuesday, January 15, 2013. The Cuban state organ Granma issued a confirmation two days later. ALBA-1 is named after the Latin American Bolivarian Alliance for the Peoples of Our America (ALBA) (Spanish: Alianza Bolivariana para los Pueblos de Nuestra América). It extends between La Guaira (Venezuela), Siboney, Cuba and Ocho Rios (Jamaica).
