= Tribuna de La Habana =

Cuban newspaper

Tribuna de La Habana – Órgano del Comité Provincial del Partido
- Type: Weekly newspaper
- Editor-in-chief: Marta Jiménez Sánchez
- Founded: 7 October 1980; 44 years ago
- Language: Spanish
- Headquarters: Plaza de la Revolución
- City: Havana
- Country: Cuba
- Circulation: 90,000 (as of September 2024)
- ISSN: 0864-1609
- Website: www.tribuna.cu

Tribuna de La Habana is a Cuban weekly newspaper. It is published in Spanish and based in the capital Havana.

It is the official paper of the provincial branch of the ruling Communist Party of Cuba (CCP) in La Habana Province.

Originally established in October 1980, the paper was launched as a broadsheet. In 1987 the format was changed to tabloid, and in January 1992 it became a weekly, published on Sundays. In November 1999 the website was launched. As of 2024, the paper claims a weekly print circulation of 90,000 copies.
