= 5 de Septiembre (newspaper) =

Cuban state newspaper

5 de Septiembre is a Cuban newspaper which is controlled by the state. It is published in Spanish, with online English, Portuguese and French pages. The newspaper was launched on 5 September 1980 and is located in Cienfuegos.
