= Sierra Maestra (newspaper) =

Cuban newspaper

Sierra Maestra is a Cuban newspaper. It is published in Spanish, with an online English edition.

The newspaper is located in Santiago de Cuba.
