= ETECSA =

Cuban state telecommunications company

Empresa de Telecomunicaciones de Cuba S.A.
- Type: State-owned enterprise
- Industry: Telecommunications
- Genre: Communications
- Founded: Havana, Cuba
- Founder: Government of Cuba
- Area served: Nationwide
- Key people: Mayra Arevich, President
- Products: Telephones, cellphones, internet
- Parent: GAESA
- Website: www.etecsa.cu

Empresa de Telecomunicaciones de Cuba S.A. (English: Telecommunications Company of Cuba; ETECSA) is the Cuban state company that provides telephony and communications services in Cuba. It is the sole lawful provider of telephony and telecommunications permitted by the Cuban penal code, constituting a communications state monopoly that has 8.2 million clients, both national and foreign.

== History ==
Before the emergence of ETECSA, there were 14 comprehensive communications companies on the island that covered the specialties of telephony, radio, mail and press, as well as other specialized national entities. In this category were the companies of Projects, Construction and Assembly, Coaxial Cable, EMTELCUBA and Long Distance.

In 1993, the constitution of ETECSA as a state and commercial entity was authorized. It was officially created on June 28, 1994 as a commercial company with mixed capital between the Cuban State through the company Telefónica Antillana S.A. (51%) and the Mexican company CITEL (49%). and in 1994 it was granted the administrative concession for the provision and commercialization of public telecommunications services.

The merger process lasted from the beginning of 1994 to February 1995, when ETECSA hired all its workers.

In April 1995 CITEL sold 25% of its shares to the Italian STET, which subsequently bought more shares in the Mexican company. Subsequently, the remaining CITEL shares were sold to other Cuban companies.

Since then, the institution has undergone periods of technological change, structure, management systems, strategic orientation and the development of new services.

On December 16, 2003, through Agreement 4996 of the Executive Committee of the Council of Ministers and Decree 275, the concession of ETECSA as a unified telecommunications operator in the country was extended, the merger of the mobile telephone companies Cubacel and C_COM Sus services which would become part of ETECSA. In the same decree law the following is stated:

"(...) The main purpose of the merger is to integrate in a single Mixed Company, all activities related to fixed and cellular telephony, as well as other telecommunications services in the country, to ensure the process of investigation, investment, production, provision of services and their commercialization in Cuba and abroad, including the purchase in the foreign market of technical assistance and supplies for production and services, as well as other activities that guarantee the normal functioning of the system and contribute to the national economy freely convertible currencies .. "

Since its founding, the company has gained in efficiency and commitment to its users. Its benefits have been diversified and the quality of the technological parameters has risen, managing to increase the number of lines installed and in service, the digitization index and support for the country's socio-economic development.

Also, based on a better organization of work and the multiple training actions that are carried out, its human resources have developed superior management.

On February 4, 2011, the Official Gazette of the Republic of Cuba announced that Cuba had acquired 100% of the shares of the company, which it controlled for the first time in its entirety since 1993. The shares were distributed as follows :

Telefónica Antillana SA: It owns 6,188 class A shares, equivalent to 51.006% of the capital stock.

Rafin SA: It owns 3,276 Class B shares, equivalent to 27.003% of the capital stock.

Universal Trade & Management corporation SA: It owns 1,345 Class B shares, equivalent to 11.086% of the capital stock.

Banco Internacional de Comercio SA: It owns 112 class B shares, equivalent to 0.923% of the capital stock.

Negocios en Telecomunicaciones SA: It owns 464 class B shares, equivalent to 3.825% of the capital stock.

== Services ==
Among the services provided by ETECSA include basic telephone services (fixed telephony), alternative fixed telephony (TFA), internet, data transmission, fiber-optical, electronic payment through its platform Transfermovily wireless communication. The company provides services for the public, business and state sectors, as well as the millions of tourists and vacationers who travel to the Republic of Cuba.

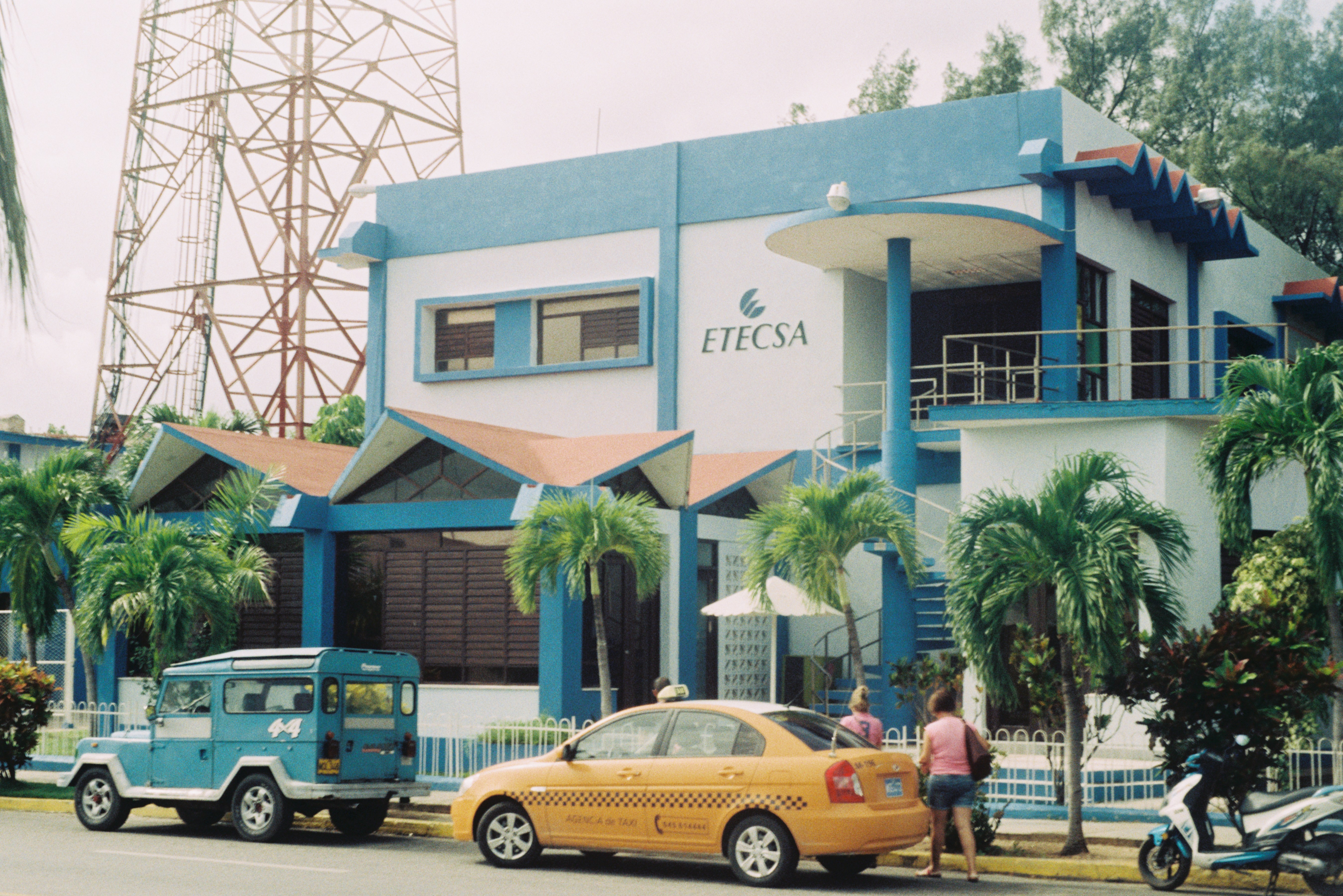
ETECSA building in Varadero

Since June 4, 2013, Cubans residing on the island were allowed the facilities for public access to the Internet under the Nauta service in 118 centers throughout the country from navigation rooms and public parks. This service had a great impact on the population since until then service was only offered in balnearios, hotels and tourist centers. Juventud Rebelde, official newspaper of the Union de Jovenes Comunistas (UJC), announced that new Internet access services would gradually become available in other public spaces, such as cultural centers, libraries and museums. The cost of Internet access is 25.00 CUP for every 2 hours and 25 minutes in public areas with WiFi connection and in navigation rooms, for access to sites hosted on Cuban servers, in the case of accounts associated with the service.

In 2016, Nauta Hogar began, a major campaign to provide service to Cuban homes.

Internet can be accessed through wi-fi zones and navigation rooms, with the Nauta Hogar service, and recently through the 3G and 4G cellular network.

=== Radio frequency summary ===
Frequency range	Band number	Generation	Protocol	Notes
900 MHz E-GSM	8	2G	GSM/GPRS/EDGE	
2100 MHz IMT	1	3G	UMTS/HSPA/HSPA+/DC-HSPA+	
900 MHz E-GSM	8	3G	UMTS/HSPA/HSPA+/DC-HSPA+	
2100 MHz IMT	1	4G	LTE/LTE-A	
1800 MHz DCS	3	4G	LTE/LTE-A	
900 MHz E-GSM	8	4G	LTE/LTE-A	
700 MHz APT	28	4G	LTE/LTE-A	

== Structure of the commercial network ==
ETECSA's current sales channel, through which the company sells and markets telecommunications products, accessories and services, comprises the network of Telepoints, Minipoints, Multiservice Centers and Commercial Offices, within which points of sale can also coexist.

=== Commercial office ===
The Commercial Office is the first and most important point of contact for ETECSA with users throughout the Cuban territory. In it, the services and products of the company are commercialized, the procedures related to the telephone service and its contractual relationships and comprehensive attention to the user and the population in general.

Services provided:

- Contracting of basic telephone services, ISDN, telegraph and special lines
- Contracting supplementary, value-added and special services.
- Reception and processing of service requests.
- Collection of the utility bill.
- Attention to complaints and suggestions.
- Consultations and commercial information.
- Marketing of telecommunications products and accessories. (*)
- Sale of prepaid phone cards.
- Other direct care services, for example the recharge of prepaid phone cards.

(*) These services are not available in all the Commercial Offices of the country.

=== Multiservice Telecommunications Center ===
The Centro Multiservicios de Telecomunicaciones constitutes a way of presenting ETECSA in the market to offer public telecommunications services. It is a category of direct care center with an identity of its own.

They are located, fundamentally, in areas of high concentration of fixed and floating population.

'Services provided:'

- Sale of telecommunications products and accessories.
- Sale of prepaid phone cards.
- Sale of prepaid Internet access cards. '(*)'
- Hiring the caller ID service.
- Internet access. '(*)'
- National and international calls.
- Audioconference. '(*)'
- Quick collection of the telephone bill.
- Telephony for the deaf and hard of hearing. '(*)'
- Fax transmission and reception
- Photocopying and printing of documents. '(*)'
- Marketing of mobile phone services. '(*)'

'(*)' These services are not available in all the multiservice telecommunications centers in the country.

=== Telepoint ===
The telepoint is ETECSA's most important presence in the market. It is a multiservice telecommunications center that offers the entire range of products and services of the company.

It is located in areas of high concentration of fixed and floating population in the provincial capitals, preferably in historical and commercial areas of the cities and, exceptionally, in places selected for their importance.

'Services provided:'

- Sale of telecommunications products and accessories.
- Sale of prepaid phone cards and own card recharge.
- Sale of prepaid Internet access cards. '(*)'
- Hiring the caller ID service.
- Internet access. '(*)'
- Public phone booths for national and international calls.
- Videoconference and audio-conference.
- Quick collection of the telephone bill
- Telephony for the deaf and hard of hearing.
- Fax transmission and reception.
- Photocopying and printing of documents. '(*)'
- Marketing of mobile phone services.

'(*)' These services are not available in all Telepoints in the country.

=== Minipoint ===
The Mini Points are ETECSA centers located in different parts of the cities for public telecommunications services.

There are two types of infrastructure: the well-known Caddy Phone and Mini-Points, which are a category of Direct Customer Service center with its own identity, and due to the area they occupy, they do not constitute a Telepunto or Multiservice Telecommunications Center.

The Minipoints are distributed throughout Cuba in areas of high concentration of fixed and floating population.

'Services provided:'

- Public phone booths for national and international calls.
- Sale of prepaid phone cards.
- Sale of prepaid Internet access cards. '(*)'
- Internet access. '(*)'
- Quick collection of the telephone bill.
- Fax transmission and reception. '(*)'
- Sale of telecommunications products and accessories. '(*)'
- Telephony for the deaf and hard of hearing. '(*)'

'(*)' These services are only in Minipoints selected based on their micro-location.

=== Repair shop ===
It is a modality of direct attention to clients to provide them with the after-sales service for the repair of fixed and mobile telephone terminal equipment marketed by ETECSA that do not have expired the warranty period, as well as the company's own equipment. Minor repairs are also made outside of the warranty period.

== Controversies ==
On September 25, 2006, it was announced that the president of the company José Antonio Fernández, and the vice minister of Communications Nelson Ferrer, had been fired by the new minister Ramiro Valdés for negligence in controlling the company.

In March 2020, during the coronavirus pandemic; The company urged Cubans to make "reasonable" use of mobile data to avoid a collapse in the island's Internet network, which caused great outrage within a population that is already forced to pay its high prices for the service, without having any other option within Cuba.

On May 30, 2024 the directives of ETECSA announced on many of their official channels the implementation changes in their policies and fees for Internet Access and mobile network. Compounding the issue, ETECSA has shifted towards a model favoring payments in U.S. dollars, limiting services available in Cuban pesos. This move has been criticized as creating a "digital apartheid," restricting internet access for those without access to foreign currency. The new measures were received with skepticism and wide rejection by large sectors of the Cuban population due to the restrictive nature of the limits in the buy of Internet packages in the Cuban Pesos, and the widespread scale of the push back obligated to many representatives of the company to make public appearances appealing to popular sympathy and arguing about the necessity of said restrictions as a way to counter economic deficit.

By the first days of June, several Faculties of Universities around the country expressed their rejection of the measures in the name of the population and declare their intention to stopping class assistance, participating into strikes or even boycotting the company by demanding the attention not only to the reversal of the new fees but also systemic changes to address the underlying economic issues. Starting with the University of Havana's Faculty of Mathematics and Computer Science, to the moment (June 5) at least another dozen of faculties and university institutions had expressed their views and disposition to opposed the changes made by ETECSA.

Despite ETECSA's partial concession to offer discounted data plans to students, many feel the measures are insufficient. The protests have garnered national and international attention, highlighting the growing dissatisfaction with the government's handling of economic policies and digital access. The official posture of the government is to discredit the student organizations and to attempt to illegitimate the Manifestos and other communications issued by the collectives of students and professors.

== See also ==
- Telecommunications in Cuba
- Internet in Cuba
- List of mobile network operators of the Americas#Cuba
