= Periódico 26 =

Periódico 26 is a Cuban newspaper. It is published in Spanish, with an online English edition. The newspaper is located in Las Tunas Province.
