= Adelante (Cuban newspaper) =

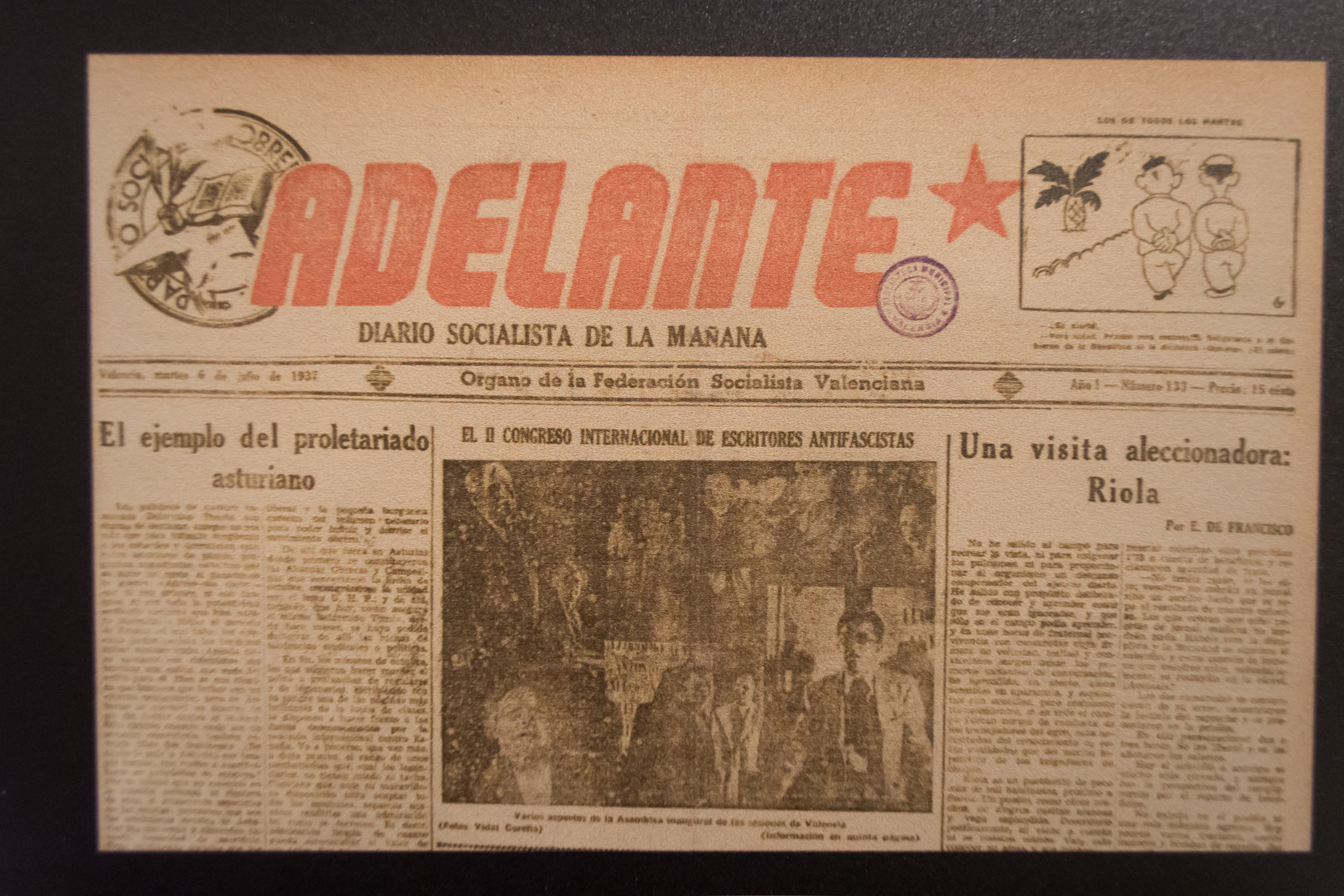
News item from the Adelante newspaper about the Alliance of Antifascist Intellectuals for the Defense of Culture (July 6, 1937).

Adelante is a Cuban newspaper started in 1959. It is published in Spanish, with an online English edition. The newspaper is located in Camagüey.
