= Guerrillero (newspaper) =

Cuban newspaper

Guerrillero is a Cuban newspaper. It is published in Spanish, with an online English edition. The newspaper is located in Pinar del Río.
