= Invasor (newspaper) =

Cuban newspaper

Invasor is a Cuban newspaper. It is published in Spanish. The newspaper is located in Ciego de Ávila.
