= Vanguardia (Cuban newspaper) =

Cuban newspaper

- Type: Weekly newspaper
- Editor-in-chief: Marelys Concepción Díaz
- Founded: 9 August 1962; 64 years ago
- Language: Spanish
- City: Santa Clara
- Country: Cuba
- Website: www.vanguardia.cu/villa-clara

Vanguardia is a Cuban weekly newspaper and website. It is published in Spanish, and based in the city of Santa Clara.

It is the official paper of the provincial branch of the ruling Communist Party of Cuba (CCP) in Villa Clara Province.
