= Venceremos (newspaper) =

Venceremos is a Cuban newspaper, founded in 1962. It is published in Spanish, with an online English edition. The newspaper is located in Guantánamo.
