= La Demajagua (newspaper) =

La Demajagua is the official Cuban newspaper of the provincial committee of the Cuban Communist Party in Granma Province. It is published in Spanish and English. It was named after the homonym sugar mill, near Manzanillo, in which Carlos Manuel de Céspedes issued his cry of independence, the "10th of October Manifesto", in 1868.
