= Ahora (newspaper) =

Cuban newspaper

¡ahora!
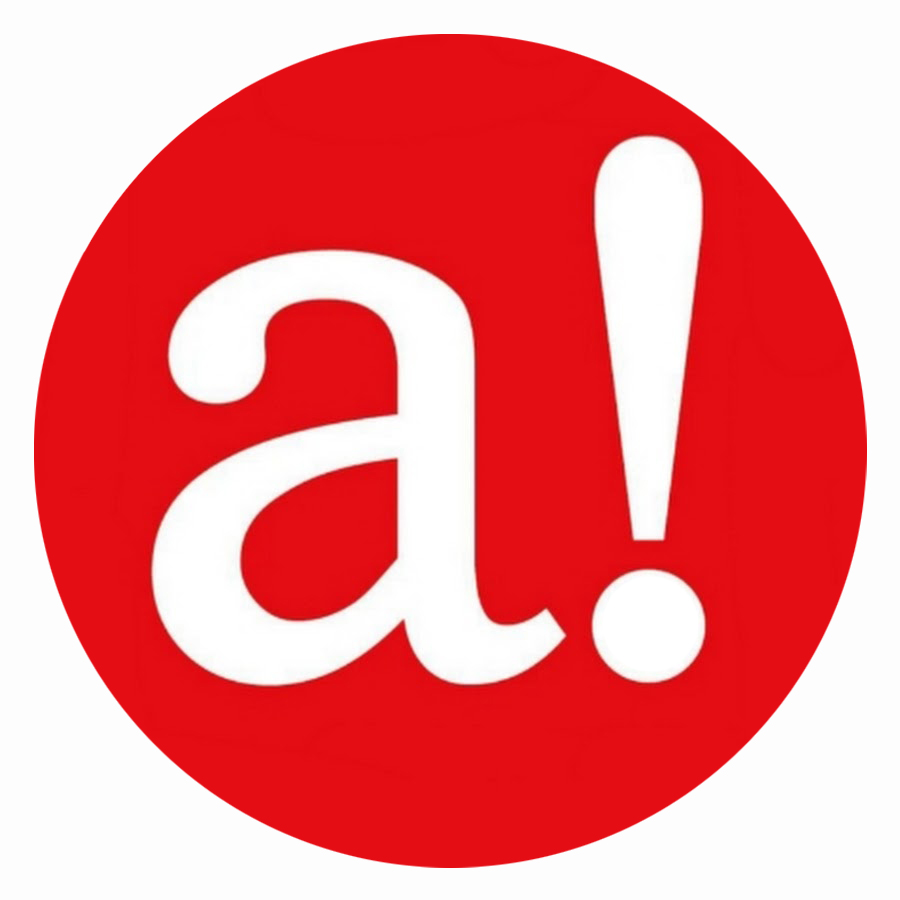
- Type: Weekly newspaper
- Founder: Raúl Castro
- Editor: Yanisleidys Martínez Peña
- Deputy editor: Claudia Arias Espinosa
- News editor: Yenny Torres Bermúdez
- Founded: November 19, 1962; 63 years ago
- Political alignment: Left wing
- Language: Spanish (print) and English and French (online)
- City: Holguín
- Country: Cuba
- Circulation: 60000 (as of 2018)
- Website: www.ahora.cu/en/

Ahora (est. 1962) is a Cuban newspaper located in Holguín. It is published in Spanish. It has been released weekly on a Saturday since January 1992.

Its editor is Yanisleidys Martínez Peña and its deputy editor Claudia Arias Espinosa.
