= Juventud Rebelde =

Cuban daily newspaper of the Young Communist League

- Diario de la juventud cubana
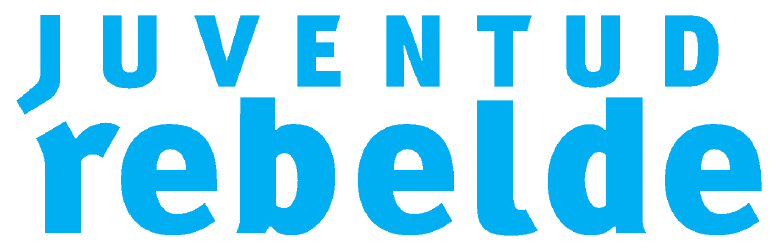

- Type: Daily newspaper
- Format: Tabloid
- Owner: Young Communist League
- Founder: Fidel Castro
- Editor: Marina Menéndez
- Founded: 21 October 1965
- Political alignment: Communism; Marxism-Leninism
- Language: Spanish
- Headquarters: Havana
- ISSN: 0864-1412
- Website: juventudrebelde.cu

The Juventud Rebelde (English: Rebel Youth) is a Cuban newspaper of the Young Communist League.

== History ==
The newspaper was announced on October 21st 1965, on the fifth anniversary of the formation of the Young Communist League. Fidel Castro described the newspaper as "a paper devoted mainly to youth, with things of interest to young people, but that must try to be a quality newspaper whose content could be interesting to all kinds of readers."

From October 1st 1990, during the Special Period, the newspaper transitioned to a weekly model.
