= Conrado =

Conrado may refer to:

== People with the given name ==
- Gregorio Conrado Álvarez (1925–2016), Uruguayan general and former dictator
- Luis Conrado Batlle or Luis Batlle Berres (1897–1964), Uruguayan political figure
- Conrado Benitez (1889–1971), former dean of the University of the Philippines
- Conrado Cabrera (born 1967), retired male track cyclist from Cuba
- Conrado Conde (born 1911), Filipino film director and an actor
- Conrado Dayrit (1919–2007), Filipino doctor and scientist known for his advocacy of coconut oil
- Conrado del Campo (1878–1953), composer, violinist and professor at the Real Conservatorio de Música in Madrid
- Evaristo Conrado Engelberg (1853–1932), Brazilian mechanical engineer and inventor
- José Conrado Hernández (1849–1932), served as Chief Justice of the Supreme Court of Puerto Rico from 1909 to 1922
- Conrado Marrero (1911–2014), Cuban professional baseball pitcher
- Conrado San Martín (born 1921), Spanish actor with a long and prolific career
- Conrado Miranda (born 1928), Salvadoran football player and former coach
- Conrado Nalé Roxlo (1898–1971), Argentine writer, journalist and humorist
- Conrado Pérez (born 1950), former basketball player from Cuba
- Conrado Rolando (born 1903), Uruguayan fencer
- Conrado M. Vasquez (1913–2006), the first Ombudsman of the Philippines and Associate Justice of the Supreme Court of the Philippines
- Conrado Vega (1938–2010), American politician and educator
- Conrado Villegas (1841–1884), Argentine general in the 1880s during the presidency of Julio Argentino Roca
- Conrado Walter (1923–2018), German prelate of the Roman Catholic Church
- Conrado (footballer, born 1991), Paulo Conrado do Carmo Sardin, Brazilian football forward
- Conrado (footballer, born 1997), Conrado Buchanelli Holz, Brazilian football left-back

== People with the surname ==
- Alex Conrado (born 1969), Spanish soundtrack composer for cinema
- Anderson Conrado (born 1978), Brazilian football (soccer) defender also known as Amaral
- José Conrado, a Cuban priest in Santiago de Cuba known for his strongly worded open letter to Cuban President Raúl Castro

== See also ==
- São Conrado, an affluent neighborhood in the South Zone (Zona Sul) of the Brazilian city of Rio de Janeiro
- Conrad (disambiguation)
