= Guantanamera Publishing =

Publisher of Cuban authors

Guantanamera Publishing is a Spanish book publisher that is a subsidiary of the Lantia Publishing Group, a technology company with its headquarters in Seville. It was established in 2017 and debuted at the International Book Fair in Havana, Cuba.

== History ==
The Publishing Director, Daniel Pinilla, started a project in conjunction with Lantia Publishing to create more visibility for Cuban literature. The project focuses on Cuban authors and an invisible generation of authors many of whom had not had the opportunity to be published or enter the international literary works market.

In 2017, after several months of searching for talent, Guantanamera Publishing officially presented its first catalog in the International Book Fair in Havana, where it had its own stand. Several books were presented in the Fair, such as La Calle de al Comedia by Eduardo del Llano and Diario de un Poeta Recién Casado by Jesús David Curbelo.

At the London Book Fair in 2017, Guantanamera Publishing made its international debut and Publishers Weekly ran a cover story on the label increasing its visibility and attracting even more authors and news stories, in publications such as Diario Granma and internationally in the Agencia EFE.

In February 2018, the Publisher announced the Guantanamera Award of Cuban Literature, an annual award that would include all books in the catalog up to May of the award year. The Carmen Balcells Literary Agency, founded by Carmen Balcells and considered the fundamental instigator of the Latin American Boom of the 1960s and 1970s, would be responsible for selecting the winner. The award was presented in Barcelona in September 2018 and given to the book Alguien tiene que llorar otra vez by Marilyn Bobes.

Also in February 2018, the magazine 14ymedio, an independent Cuban magazine founded by Yoani Sánchez, stated that several of the books that were sent to the Book Fair in Havana by Guantanamera were confiscated by the Cuban authorities due to customs issues.
