= Pablo Díaz Espí =

Cuban journalist and editor (born 1972)

- Born: 1972 (age 53–54); Havana, Cuba
- Occupations: Journalist, editor
- Known for: Founder and director of Diario de Cuba
- Father: Jesús Díaz

Pablo Díaz Espí (born 1972) is a Cuban journalist and editor living in exile, the founder and director of the Madrid-based news website Diario de Cuba. He previously ran the news portal Cubaencuentro.

== Early life ==
Díaz Espí was born in Havana in 1972, the son of the novelist and filmmaker Jesús Díaz, who later founded the exile magazine Encuentro de la Cultura Cubana. According to his account for the oral-history project Memory of Nations, his family was close to the revolutionary establishment, and as a schoolboy during the 1980 Mariel boatlift he was made to take part in acts of repudiation against people leaving the country. He went into exile in 1990, settling in Berlin shortly after the fall of the Berlin Wall, where he studied at a film and television school.

== Career ==
Díaz Espí founded the Cuban news portal Cubaencuentro, which he directed until 2009. Memory of Nations dates its founding to 1999 and says he set it up with his father; the Havana Times gives his time as director as 2000 to 2009.

In 2009 he left Cubaencuentro and, with a group of Cuban journalists, artists and intellectuals in Madrid, launched Diario de Cuba, which went online on 4 February 2009. He has directed it since its founding. In 2014 he said the site aimed to cover politics, sport, culture and opinion rather than concentrating on human rights reporting, and rejected suggestions from readers that it was right-wing. A Diario de Cuba journalist interviewed by the researcher Cosette Celecia Pérez recalled him saying that the site's aim was to "go for the jugular of Castroism".

In December 2011 he was listed among the speakers at a National Endowment for Democracy panel in Washington on the legacy of the Ladies in White leader Laura Pollán. In 2019 an investigation he wrote with Mirta Fernández Laffitte and the Brazilian journalist Marcelo Soares on Cuba's role in Brazil's Mais Médicos programme received an honourable mention in the Javier Valdez Latin American Prize for Investigative Journalism.

After the Trump administration froze funding from the United States Agency for International Development in early 2025, he published an appeal to readers, writing that the suspension of U.S. government aid to independent journalism made the site's work "even more arduous". In October 2025 he was interviewed on Pensar Cuba, a video podcast of the Cuban outlet El Toque.

The Miami Book Fair describes him as also directing the publishing house Editorial Hypermedia and working for the German broadcaster Deutsche Welle, and says he divides his time between Madrid and Berlin.
