= Diario de Cuba =

Madrid-based news website covering Cuba

- Website type: News website
- Available in: Spanish
- Headquarters: Madrid, Spain
- Founder: Pablo Díaz Espí
- Website: diariodecuba.com
- Launched: 4 February 2009
- Current status: Active

Diario de Cuba (DDC) is a Spanish-language news website about Cuba, based in Madrid. It was launched on 4 February 2009 by the Cuban exile journalist Pablo Díaz Espí with a group of Cuban journalists, artists and intellectuals. It publishes news, opinion and cultural coverage, including work by independent journalists in Cuba, meaning journalists who work outside the island's state-controlled media. In a history of Cuba's alternative media, the communication researcher Edel Lima Sarmiento cited it, with 14ymedio, as an example of the digital media that he identifies as the main alternative media of the present period.

The site has been blocked in Cuba since at least 2017. It received a grant from the National Endowment for Democracy in 2013, and in 2025 its director said the suspension of U.S. government aid had made its work harder. Several of its reporters in Cuba have been detained by the authorities.

== History ==
Díaz Espí, born in Havana in 1972, is the son of the novelist and filmmaker Jesús Díaz, founder of the magazine Encuentro de la Cultura Cubana. He founded the news site Cubaencuentro in 2000 and ran it until 2009, when he left to start Diario de Cuba. According to a 2014 Havana Times profile, the site's founders wanted to cover politics, sport, culture and opinion rather than concentrating on human rights reporting, which other exile projects already did.

From Madrid, the site works with journalists based in Cuba and publishes articles and opinion pieces that could not appear in the official Cuban press. In 2020 the Committee to Protect Journalists (CPJ) identified Mirta Fernández Laffitte as its editor-in-chief. In 2019 the writer Antonio José Ponte was its deputy director.

In 2019 an investigation by Díaz Espí, Fernández Laffitte and the Brazilian journalist Marcelo Soares into Cuba's role in Brazil's Mais Médicos programme received an honourable mention in the Javier Valdez Latin American Prize for Investigative Journalism. In October 2019 Diario de Cuba was among the independent Cuban news outlets that signed a joint declaration denouncing harassment of journalists on the island.

== Access in Cuba ==
In 2014 Díaz Espí said the site was not blocked in Cuba, unlike Cubaencuentro and CubaNet, although limited Internet access on the island kept its readership there small. A 2017 report by the Open Observatory of Network Interference found it among at least 41 sites blocked in Cuba. On 24 February 2019, the day of the constitutional referendum, EFE reported that Diario de Cuba was among several critical news sites that could not be reached from the island. Its articles also circulated offline. The sociologist Ted Henken reported in 2021 that the paketito, an underground weekly compilation of digital content passed around the island, included a folder of "prohibited print media" that typically featured recent articles from Diario de Cuba, 14ymedio and CubaNet.

== Detention of journalists ==
The CPJ has reported several detentions of Diario de Cuba reporters. In June 2017 state security agents and Interior Ministry officials detained Manuel Alejandro León Velázquez, the site's correspondent in Guantánamo, and confiscated a computer, a camera and work documents from his home. He had previously been detained while reporting on the aftermath of Hurricane Matthew in October 2016. In June 2020 police arrested Jorge Enrique Rodríguez in Havana and held him at a criminal processing centre while a trial was arranged; the CPJ called for his release. He was released several days later. In 2019 a Diario de Cuba journalist was among several independent journalists barred from leaving the country.

== Funding ==
In 2014 Díaz Espí said the site was funded by advertising, private donors and public funds from the United States and Spain, and that none of its funders influenced its content. The National Endowment for Democracy's 2013 annual report listed a grant of $262,480 to the Asociación Diario de Cuba. After the Trump administration froze USAID funding in early 2025, Díaz Espí, still the site's director, published an appeal to readers, writing that the suspension of U.S. aid to independent journalism had made the site's work harder. The Cuban government describes U.S.-funded news outlets as proxies for U.S. foreign policy.

== Editorial line ==
Some readers in Cuba have described the site as right-wing. Díaz Espí rejected the label in 2014, pointing to its coverage of racism and gay rights and to contributions from left-wing writers, while saying it would not publish articles in support of the Cuban government. A Diario de Cuba journalist interviewed by the researcher Cosette Celecia Pérez described it as openly opposed to the Cuban government, and recalled its director saying that its aim was to "go for the jugular of Castroism". Writing in the Afro-Hispanic Review in 2014, Andy Petit criticised Diario de Cuba's Spanish translation of the Cuban writer Roberto Zurbano's 2013 New York Times article on race in Cuba. He argued that it left out passages on the colonial roots of racial inequality and on the Cuban government's achievements, and described Diario de Cuba and Martí Noticias as "staunch organs of Cuba's plantocracy in exile".

== Reception ==
Lima Sarmiento placed Diario de Cuba among the oppositional news sites of Cuba's "digital diaspora", all funded and run from abroad, which he set in a long tradition of Cuban exile media. The political scientist Marie Laure Geoffray named it among the diaspora news sites through which independent digital journalism developed in the 2000s, before similar platforms emerged on the island. Carlos Manuel Rodríguez Arechavaleta described Diario de Cuba and CubaNet as outlets that "typically address both cultural and political topics, like human rights".

In January 2020 the Cuban radio station Radio Progreso included Diario de Cuba in a list, later deleted, of 21 non-state media that it called the "most reactionary sites" reporting on Cuba. In interviews by the journalism scholar Sara Garcia Santamaria with journalists at newer island-based outlets, one described CubaNet and Diario de Cuba as outlets that "suffer a stigma because they were some of the first ones and, since they are led by activists, they are very polarized".

== See also ==
- CubaNet
- 14ymedio
- Mass media in Cuba
