= Vincent Verouden =

Dutch politician (born 1971)

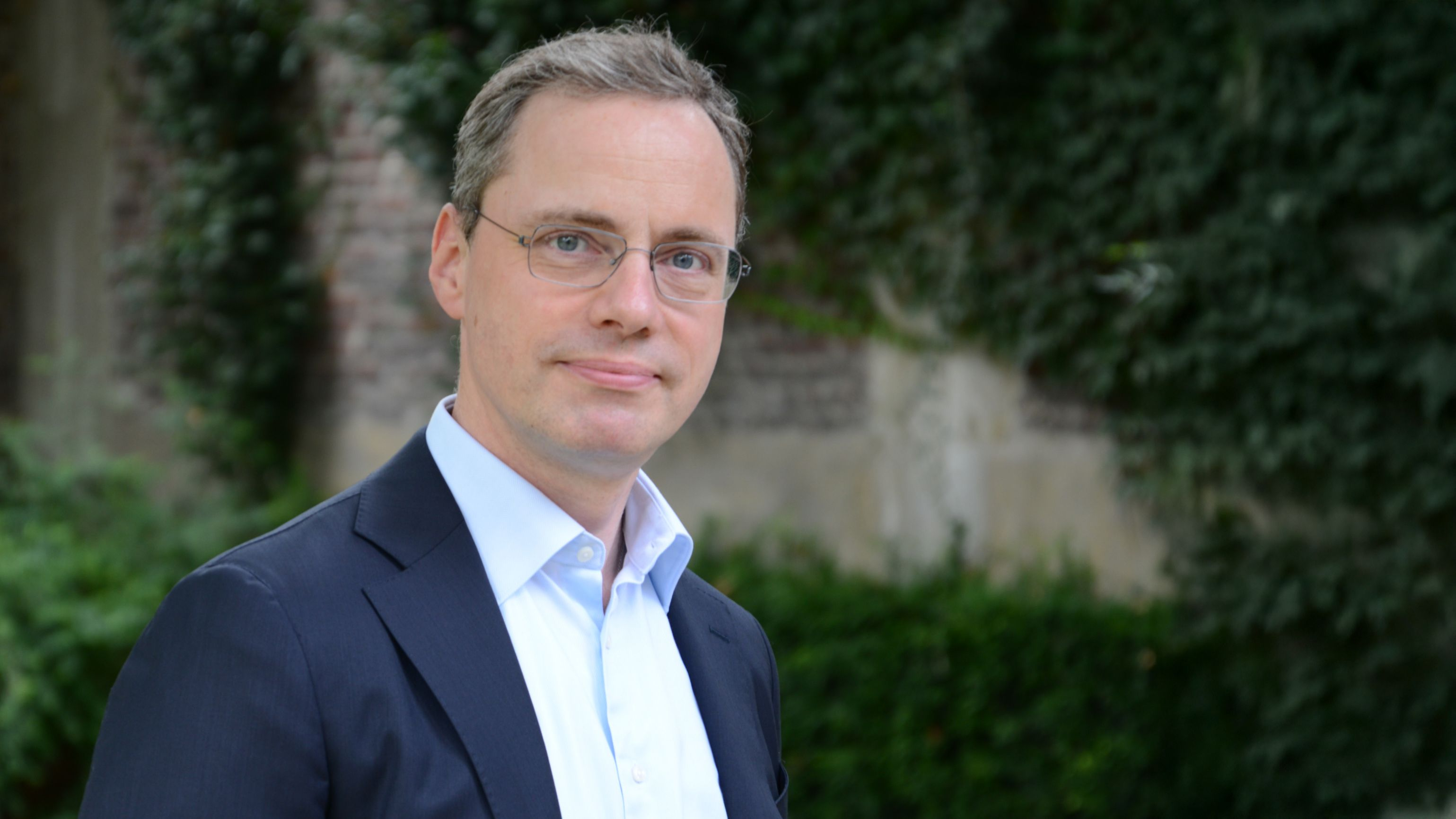

Member of the House of Representatives
- In office 2 September 2025 – 11 November 2025

Personal details
- Born: Vincentius Cornelius Henricus Maria Verouden; 19 August 1971 (age 55) Weert, Netherlands
- Party: New Social Contract
- Education: Tilburg University
- Occupation: Civil servant; politician

Vincentius Cornelius Henricus Maria "Vincent" Verouden (Dutch: [ˈvɪnsɛnt vərˈʌudə(n)]; born 19 August 1971) is a Dutch economist and former politician.

From September 2 to November 11, 2025, Verouden was a member of the Dutch Parliament (Tweede Kamer der Staten-Generaal, House of Representatives) for the party New Social Contract (NSC). He took the seat that became vacant after the departure of another NSC member. His activities in the House concentrated upon the portfolios of Economic Affairs and European Affairs. On September 24, 2025, Verouden addressed the House of Representatives in his maiden speech. He was not re-elected in October 2025, as NSC lost all its seats, and his term ended on 11 November 2025.

Professionally, Verouden is active in the field of competition policy and EU state aid control. Verouden studied econometrics at Tilburg University from September 1989, graduating in 1995. He obtained his PhD on June 25, 2001, under Professor Eric van Damme with a thesis entitled 'Essays in antitrust economics'. He started to work in the European Commission's Competition Department in January 2000 and was Deputy Chief Economist of this department from 2012 to 2014. He then worked as a director for an economic consulting firm in Brussels from 2014 to 2019. At the end of 2019, Verouden rejoined the European Commission, where he was a member of the Task Force for the EU Recovery Fund during the Covid pandemic. In December 2021, he returned to the Competition Department as a policy analyst and senior economist.

Verouden is the author of various publications in the field of competition economics. He is co-editor (with Philipp Werner) of a well-known publication on state aid control, 'EU State Aid Control: Law and Economics.' Verouden further acts as a guest lecturer, including at Tilburg University and the Brussels School of Competition.
