= BSC =

BSC may refer to:

- Bachelor of Science, an educational degree, holders sometimes using post-nominal BSc

== Organizations ==
=== Education ===
- Bentleigh Secondary College, in Melbourne, Australia
- Brentwood Secondary College, in Melbourne, Australia
- Birmingham–Southern College, in Alabama, United States
- Bismarck State College, in North Dakota, United States
- Bridgewater State University, in Massachusetts, United States
- Buffalo State College, in New York, United States
- Bluefield State College, in West Virginia, United States
- Brussels Study Center, in Brussels, Belgium
- Bryant & Stratton College, a for-profit college chain in the United States
- Berkeley Student Cooperative, a housing organization at University of California, Berkeley
- Bishop's Stortford College, in Hertfordshire, United Kingdom

=== Companies ===
- Boston Scientific Corporation, a medical device company
- British Steel Corporation, a metal manufacturer
- Bear Stearns, an investment bank, by stock symbol
- British Sugar, formerly British Sugar Corporation
- Boston Sports Clubs, a fitness club chain owned by Town Sports International Holdings

=== Other ===
- Barcelona Supercomputing Center, a research facility
- Bird Studies Canada, a nature conservation organization
- Border Security Command, a law enforcement agency in the United Kingdom
- British Security Co-ordination, a British World War II intelligence and propaganda operation in the United States
- British Society of Cinematographers, a movie craft organization, members sometimes using post-nominal BSC
- Broadcasting Standards Commission, a British government agency incorporated into Ofcom
- California Building Standards Commission, a US state agency responsible for building codes

== Science and technology ==
- Binary symmetric channel, a data transmission error model
- Binary Synchronous Communications, a computer networking protocol
- Biological safety cabinet, a laboratory pathogen housing
- Biological Stain Commission, an independent quality-control service for dyes
- Bright Star Catalogue, a list of stars visible to the naked-eye
- Bristol stool chart, a medical assessment scale for feces
- British Standard Cycle, a screw thread standard
- Biological species concept, a rule for distinguishing species
- Base station controller, part of a mobile telephone network
- Basic Spacing between Centers, in IC package

== Sport ==
- Barcelona Sporting Club, an Ecuadorian football club
- Basra Sports City, a sports complex in Iraq
- Bay State Conference, a high school athletic conference in Massachusetts, United States
- Big Sky Conference, a western United States college conference
- Big South Conference, a southeastern United States college conference
- Bi-State Conference, an Arkansas and Oklahoma junior college conference
- Bohemian Sporting Club, a Filipino football club
- Budo Sento Championship, a Mexican mixed martial arts an other combat sports promotion
- Hertha BSC, a German football club
- BSC Glasgow F.C., a Scottish football club

== Music ==
- Black Stone Cherry, an American hard rock band
- Blood Stain Child, a Japanese melodic death metal band
- Bundesvision Song Contest, a German music contest
- The Beacon Street Collection, a ska punk album by No Doubt, 1995
- "BSC", a song by Maisie Peters from The Good Witch, 2023 (an abbreviation of "Batshit Crazy")

== Other uses ==
- Balanced scorecard, an organizational performance analysis tool
- Best supportive care, a term for palliative care used in clinical trials
- Broglio Space Centre, a spaceport
- The Baby-Sitters Club, a series of books
- Building Service Cleaners
- Binance Smart Chain, a cryptocurrency by Binance

== See also ==
- BCS (disambiguation)
