= Rosa Berre =

Cuban-American journalist and activist, founder of CubaNet

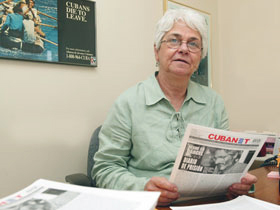
- Born: September 23, 1941; Havana, Cuba
- Died: December 19, 2006; Miami, Florida
- Citizenship: Cuban, American
- Education: University of Havana
- Occupation: Journalist
- Employer: Cubanet
- Website: cubanet.org

Rosa Berre Rey (Havana, 1941 – Miami, October 19, 2006) was a Cuban-American journalist and activist, best known as the founder of Cubanet, an independent Cuban news website launched in 1994 to publish reporting by independent journalists inside Cuba.

== Early life and career in Cuba ==
Berre was born in Havana in 1941 to Fara Rey (1915–2002), a journalist and historian, and Antonio Berre, a leader in Cuba's Communist youth organization. She trained as a teacher at the Escuela Normal para Maestros and studied journalism at the University of Havana. A member of the generation that initially supported the 1959 revolution, she went to work at the newspaper Hoy, the organ of Cuba's Communist Party, and continued in journalism after Hoy merged into Revolución to form Granma in 1965.

During the late 1960s, Berre and her husband, Carlos Quintela — who had served as national secretary for propaganda of the Union of Young Communists (UJC) and director of Mella magazine before resigning those posts in 1962 in solidarity with board members expelled over "discrepancies with the maximum leader" — fell out of favor with the government over what was officially described as "ideological problems." Both were expelled from their jobs and assigned to agricultural labor in Pinar del Río province; Raúl Castro publicly branded them among the "réprobos" (reprobates). From 1975 she began making handicrafts (artesanía) as a hobby.

== Peruvian embassy crisis and Mariel boalift ==
In April 1980, Berre entered the Peruvian embassy in Havana together with Quintela and their daughters, amid the mass asylum-seeking crisis that followed the Cuban government's withdrawal of embassy security. Quintela's asylum-seeking that year is independently corroborated in a separate historical account of the period. The family subsequently left Cuba that year as part of the Mariel boatlift, one of roughly 125,000 Cubans who emigrated to the United States between April and September 1980. A 2025 retrospective in Diario las Américas named Berre, alongside the writer Reinaldo Arenas, among the notable figures who left Cuba through the Mariel exodus.

== CubaNet ==
Rosa Berre settled in Coral Gables, Florida. In early 1994, working from her kitchen with a computer and a fax machine, she organized a network of independent journalists writing from inside Cuba and founded Cubanet, one of the earliest independent Cuban news outlets to use the internet to circumvent state media control. She directed the outlet until her death in 2006; Cubanet has continued publishing since, run by a fellow Mariel-generation exile.

She also wrote "Repression Against Civil Society," an essay on the Cuban government's 2003 crackdown on independent journalists and civil society, published as a chapter in the Cubanet-produced booklet Repression in Cuba: A Battle Against the People.

== Personal life ==
Rosa Berre and Carlos Quintela had three daughters, Nubia, Nivia, and Ninfa. Carlos Quintela died in 2001 after a long struggle with cancer.

== Death ==
Rosa Berre died in Miami on October 19, 2006, following a long struggle with cancer. She was survived by her brother, Antonio Berre, her daughters Nubia and Nivia Quintela, nephew Max Berre and granddaughter Raquel Espasande.

== See also ==
- Antonio Berre
- Max Berre
- Mariel boatlift
