= CubaNet =

Florida-based news website covering Cuba

- Website type: News website
- Available in: Spanish
- Headquarters: Coral Gables, Florida, U.S.
- Owners: CubaNet News, Inc.
- Founder: Rosa Berre
- Website: cubanet.org
- Launched: 1994
- Current status: Active

CubaNet is a Spanish-language news website about Cuba, published by CubaNet News, Inc., a non-profit organization based in Coral Gables, Florida. It was started in 1994 by a group of Cuban exiles that included the journalist Rosa Berre, who is generally credited as its founder. CubaNet publishes reporting and commentary by independent journalists on the island, meaning journalists who work outside Cuba's state-controlled media. In 2020 the news agency EFE described it as the oldest digital publication on Cuban affairs edited in Miami, and in 2025 the Miami Herald called it the oldest independent Cuban news outlet.

Several CubaNet correspondents were jailed during the 2003 Black Spring crackdown, and others have been imprisoned since. The site is blocked in Cuba. Its tax filings state that it is supported mainly by a U.S. government grant; according to Reuters, it received $500,000 from the United States Agency for International Development (USAID) in 2024. In 2025 USAID cancelled a three-year grant of $1.8 million to the organization. Reuters reported that the Cuban government describes U.S.-funded Cuban news outlets as proxies for U.S. foreign policy.

== History ==
=== Founding and early years ===
Berre was born in Havana in 1941 and studied journalism there without graduating. In Cuba she and her husband, the journalist Carlos Quintela, were accused of sectarianism and sent to do agricultural work in Pinar del Río Province, and she was later barred from journalism. She left Cuba in the 1980 Mariel boatlift. CubaNet was started in 1994 by a group of Cuban exiles, and El Nuevo Herald later credited Berre as its founder. She moved to Miami in 1996 and opened CubaNet's offices there.

In April 1996 the Sun-Sentinel described CubaNet as a website started about eighteen months earlier by émigrés, some of them living in Miami. About fifteen volunteers, including Cuban Americans, other Americans and a Greek, spent around $800 a month phoning people in Cuba and transcribing interviews and letters. The site published three to five articles a day, along with old photographs of Cuba and work by dissident painters. Its articles that year included a piece by the journalist José Rivero García on the shootdown of two Brothers to the Rescue planes. Omar Galloso, a Miami resident who directed the project in his spare time, told the paper that its aim was to bring information about Cuba to the world, not to change Cuba from within.

CubaNet published the work of the independent news agencies that were forming in Cuba in the mid-1990s. By 1996 its website carried reports by journalists of the agency CubaPress. Journalists on the island had almost no access to the Internet and sent their reports to Miami by telephone or fax. In July 1996 the trade journal Editor & Publisher described how reports from the four new agencies, Havana Press, Cuba Press, the Cuban Independent Journalists Bureau and the Association of Cuban Independent Journalists, were phoned in to two Miami bureaus run by exiled journalists, which passed them on to newspapers and Radio Martí; it noted that CubaNet also published their articles. By 1997, according to its website, CubaNet was published by The CubaNet Organization, Inc. It listed nine independent agencies in Cuba as sources, among them Havana Press, the Cuban Independent Press Agency (APIC), the Union of Independent Cuban Journalists and Writers (UPECI) and the Oriental Free Press Agency (APLO). It named the National Endowment for Democracy, Freedom House and El Nuevo Herald among U.S. organizations it cooperated with. In 2001 Wired News named CubaNet and CubaFreePress, both based in Miami, as "the two main websites that carry independent press reports" from Cuba.

In 2006 Reporters Without Borders reported that CubaNet drew on about 40 journalists in Cuba, 15 of them freelancers and the rest members of 11 small local agencies. It received about 25 news items and a similar number of opinion and feature pieces each week. Besides the website, which was then published in Spanish, English and French, it produced a semimonthly bulletin and a bimonthly magazine, some copies of which circulated clandestinely in Cuba. Contributors were paid per piece: $5 for a short news item and $15 for a column or article.

=== Black Spring ===
In March 2003 the Cuban government arrested 75 dissidents and independent journalists in the crackdown known as the Black Spring. According to the John S. and James L. Knight Foundation, 12 CubaNet correspondents were in prison by the end of the year, nine of them arrested that spring. The number of journalists filing for the site fell from 40 to 28. Knight gave CubaNet a two-year grant of $188,000 for its magazine and for a report on the arrests, to be published as a book and distributed to independent libraries in Cuba.

Manuel Vázquez Portal, a journalist imprisoned in the Black Spring and released on medical parole in 2004, later settled in Miami and became an editor at CubaNet.

=== Leadership ===
Berre was described as CubaNet's president in 2003 and as its vice-president in 2006. She died of cancer at her home in Miami on October 19, 2006. Hugo Landa, who also left Cuba in the Mariel boatlift, became CubaNet's editor in 2007 and later its executive director. In 2014 Landa wrote that CubaNet published news from about 40 citizen journalists in Cuba, whom its editorial staff coached in basic journalism, ethics and digital and physical security. In 2019 the Committee to Protect Journalists (CPJ) identified Landa as executive director and Roberto Hechavarría Pilia as editor. By 2025 the Miami Herald described Hechavarría as CubaNet's director.

In October 2019 CubaNet was one of 19 independent Cuban news outlets that signed a joint declaration denouncing harassment of journalists and calling for independent journalism to be legalized in Cuba.

=== Pressure on contributors ===
In April 2007 Oscar Sánchez Madan, a 44-year-old independent journalist who wrote for CubaNet, was sentenced to four years in prison for "risk of crime" (risque de délit) within hours of his arrest on April 13. Le Monde reported that, according to the Cuban Commission for Human Rights and National Reconciliation, he was the 25th independent journalist then imprisoned in Cuba.

In 2019 Roberto de Jesús Quiñones Haces, a lawyer who wrote for CubaNet in Guantánamo, was detained while covering a trial and later sentenced to a year of correctional labour for "resistance" and "disobedience". The CPJ reported that police beat him during the arrest. In April 2020 the One Free Press Coalition, a group of news organizations including Fortune, listed his case among its "10 Most Urgent" press freedom cases, reporting that he had been placed in solitary confinement after prison staff learned he was secretly publishing from prison. Amnesty International considered him a prisoner of conscience. He was released in September 2020 after serving the sentence.

Camila Acosta, who reported for CubaNet and was Havana correspondent for the Spanish daily ABC, was detained while covering the July 2021 protests. She spent four days in prison and was then held under house arrest, facing charges of "public disturbance" and "inciting crime". She told The Washington Post that her interrogators asked whom she worked for, how much she earned and what she reported on.

Freedom House reported that from mid-September 2024, as a 2022 revision of the penal code and a 2023 social communication law began to be applied against independent journalists, CubaNet and other outlets including El Toque and Periodismo de Barrio reported a new wave of state repression against their collaborators in Cuba.

== Funding ==
CubaNet has received grants from private foundations and the U.S. government. In 2003 the Knight Foundation awarded it $188,000. The National Endowment for Democracy listed a grant of $219,080 to CubaNet News in its 2013 annual report. Writing in NACLA Report on the Americas in 2021, María Isabel Alfonso reported that CubaNet News, Inc. had received $900,631 between 2016 and 2019 for a project titled "Supporting Independent Journalism in Cuba". The organization's own program description in its federal tax filings states that it is supported mainly by a USAID grant. Reuters and Telemundo 51 reported that CubaNet received $500,000 from USAID in 2024. Reuters described the stated aim as engaging young Cubans on the island through multimedia journalism. In late February 2025 CubaNet was notified that USAID had cancelled its three-year, $1.8 million grant, which had been due to expire that September. According to Hechavarría, payments under the grant had already been suspended since President Trump's executive order of January 20.

The Cuban government objects to U.S. funding of Cuban news outlets. After the Trump administration froze USAID funding in early 2025, Deputy Foreign Minister Carlos Fernández de Cossío questioned whether journalists paid through USAID could be called independent. CubaNet asked its readers for donations, and told Telemundo 51 that the loss of the funds had reduced its ability to support its contributors in Cuba.

== Reception ==
The communication researcher Edel Lima Sarmiento listed CubaNet (1994), along with Cubaencuentro, Diario de Cuba, CiberCuba and ADN Cuba, as the oppositional news sites of Cuba's "digital diaspora", all funded and run from abroad. He placed them in a tradition of exile media going back to the wars of independence. The political scientist Marie Laure Geoffray wrote that independent digital journalism developed first in the diaspora during the 2000s, through sites such as CubaNet, Diario de Cuba and Café Fuerte, and only later on the island. She noted that CubaNet and 14ymedio said explicitly that they wanted to contribute to regime change, while most newer outlets presented themselves as alternatives to the official press.

In January 2020 the Cuban radio station Radio Progreso included CubaNet in a list, later deleted, of 21 non-state media that it called the "most reactionary sites" reporting on Cuba.

In interviews by the journalism scholar Sara Garcia Santamaria with journalists at newer independent outlets, one described CubaNet and Diario de Cuba as outlets that "suffer a stigma because they were some of the first ones and, since they are led by activists, they are very polarized".

== See also ==
- Media of Cuba
- Diario de Cuba
- 14ymedio
