= Max Berre =

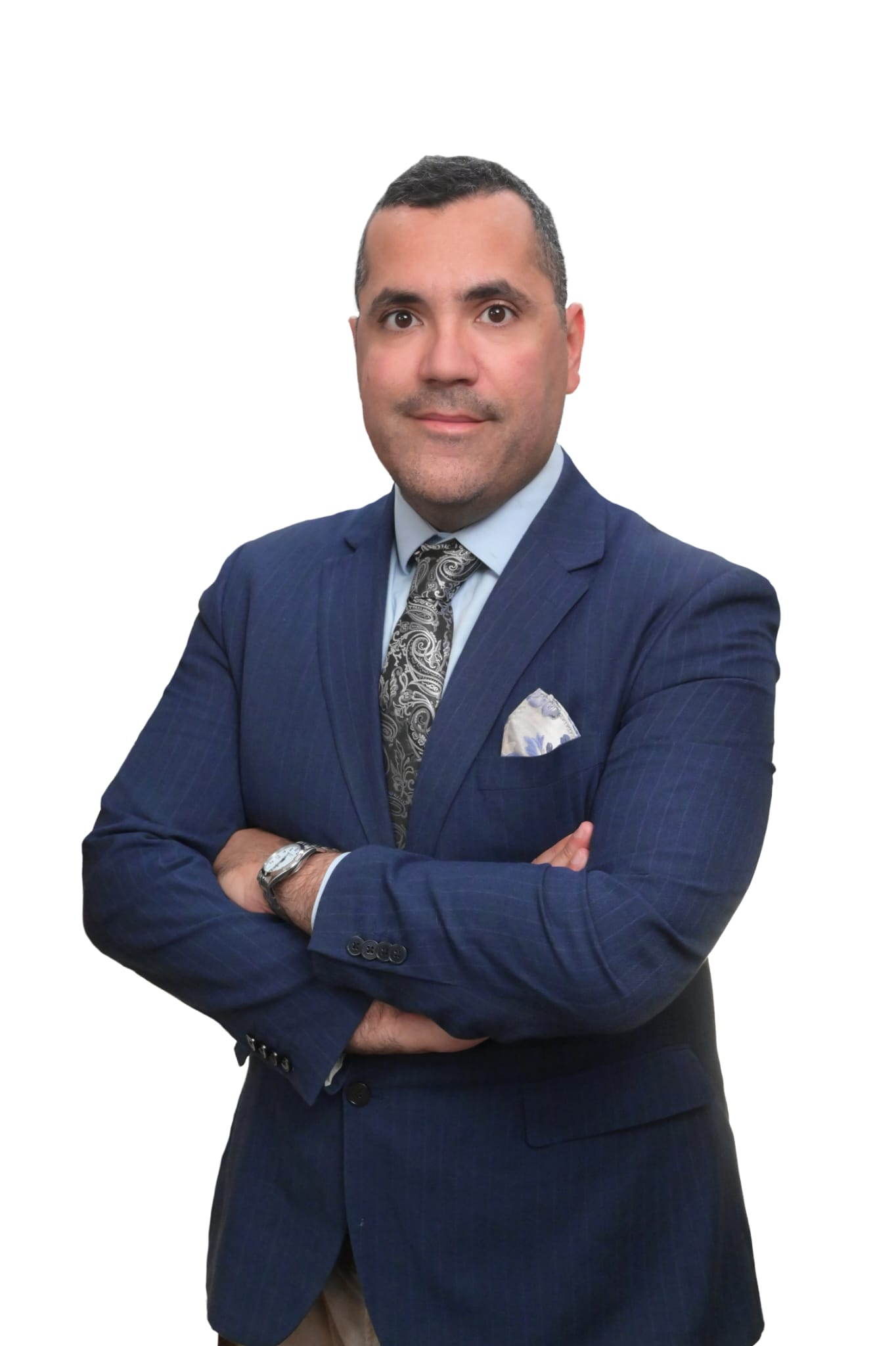
- Born: November 30, 1981; Jersey City, New Jersey
- Citizenship: Belgian, American
- Education: American University, Maastricht University, Ghent University, Université de Lyon
- Occupations: Economist, Journalist
- Employer: EDC Paris Business School
- Website: www.edcparis.edu/en/our-teachers/berre-max

Maxens (Max) Berre (born 1981) is a US-born Cuban-American economist, journalist, and academic, known for his work on startup valuation, sovereign debt, entrepreneurial finance policy implications, and small-business finance. He has extensive professional experience in both the US and the EU, and is based in Paris, Brussels, and Washington, D.C.

== Early life and family ==
Max Berre was born in Jersey City, New Jersey to Antonio Berre (1945–2012), Cuban-American journalist, dissident, and former Cuban military officer, and Marietta Ulacia, Cuban-American artist and arts administrator. The Berre family subsequently moved to Washington, D.C. in 1984.

In Washington, Antonio Berre became a reporter for UPI and later for Radio Marti, while Marietta Ulacia went on to found the Latin American Folk Institute (LAFI).

== Education ==
Berre pursued bachelor's studies at American University, attending the School of International Service, graduating with the class of 2005.

Subsequently, Berre attended master's studies in the Netherlands and Belgium. He graduated with a master's in economics from Maastricht University, with a master's in banking and finance from Ghent University in 2012, and with an LL.M. in European Competition Law and Economics pursued at the Brussels Study Center in 2020.

Berre holds a doctorate in Sciences Économiques et Gestion (Economics and Management) from the Université de Lyon, completed between 2018 and 2023, with his final thesis titled "Valuation of Start-up Companies".

== Career as an economist ==
Early in his career, Berre interned at the Brazilian Embassy in Washington, D.C., where he worked on trade documents, as well as on the economic history of Brazil. Following this, worked at the Inter-American Development Bank's Caribbean Country Department as a Sovereign Debt Economist (2007–2009), following an earlier internship in the Private Sector Group there. He subsequently held positions with EDHEC-Risk Institute, Capital Life, Knowledge House Maastricht, and Maastricht University.

Meanwhile, as ajunct faculy, Berre lectured at various French business schools including Audencia Business School, EMLYON, ESSCA, and EDHEC. After defending his PhD, Berre briefly lectured at Nyenrode Business University, and held a postdoc at the University of Milan.

In 2025, Berre joined the faculty of EDC Paris Business School. During his PhD, Berre began as a Research Economist specializing in SME and Startup Valuation at the Finance for Innovation Chair at Audencia Business School, based between Brussels and Paris. He is also the chief economist of DLC Legal & Investment (Diversity Law Consulting), a Spain-based law firm working in international business law, mergers and acquisitions, venture capital, and art and luxury law, alongside partners Raquel Cayotopa Díaz and Lam Luong. Berre serves as Treasurer of the board of Friends of the BSC, the Brussels Study Centre's alumni association.

== Career as a journalist ==
As a journalist, Berre was a local news reporter for WAMU, the Washington, D.C. National Public Radio affiliate in 2003 and 2004. After moving to Europe, served briefly as the economics and finance correspondent for Capital Life, a Brussels-based English-language news website. He has also served as International Tech Correspondent for Environmental Social Justice (ESJ), an interview-format podcast and YouTube show hosted by Wendy Nystrom, appearing in multiple 2022 episodes discussing energy economics and energy storage technology. He is also a finance correspondent for Euro Prospects, writing on sovereign debt topics including Ethiopia's official-creditor debt restructuring negotiations.

== Published Research ==
Berre's peer-reviewed publications include "What do we know about startup-valuation drivers? A systematic literature review" (Venture Capital, 25(4), 2023) and "Connectedness of entrepreneurial ecosystems: the impact of VC financing mobility on startup valuations" (Small Business Economics, 2025).

Alongside Benjamin Le Pendeven, his former PhD thesis advisor, he authored a widely circulated working paper modeling the relationship between startup valuations and macroeconomic cycles, based on a dataset of 1,089 observations across 675 European startups from 2000 to 2020, published by Audencia's Chair in Finance for Innovation.

With François Constant, he has also published on the perceived benefits of artificial intelligence in purchasing processes. Other research interests include startup valuation using supervised machine learning and coherent stress testing via Bayesian scenario analysis.

Presently, the focus of his research lies in the "Bridge to Macro" concept, a concept inspired by the Mario Draghi 2024 EU speech, linking entrepreneurial and SME finance to macroeconomic policy, financial and competition regulation, and systemic risk.

== Persoanl life and family connections ==
Berre is a grandson of the journalist and historian Fara Rey, and a nephew of journalist Rosa Berre. He became a naturalized Belgian citizen in 2016 and has one daughter named Sophie Berre Rodriguez Belisario.

As a hobby, Max Berre is a percussionist, having notably been a member of Arieto, a Washington DC are salsa band, and was once featured in Clave Magazine, the magazine of the Latin American Folk Institute.
