= Antonio Berre =

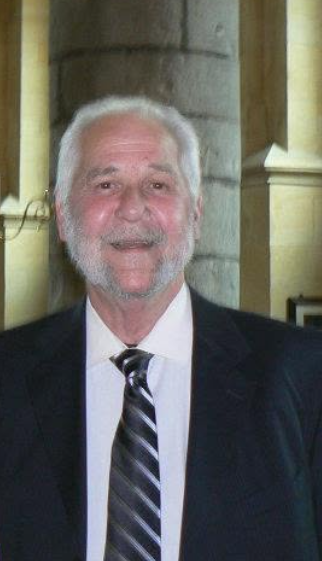
- Born: September 23, 1945; Havana, Cuba
- Died: February 3, 2012; Alexandria, Virginia
- Citizenship: Cuban, American
- Education: University of Havana
- Occupations: Journalist, Radio Journalist
- Employer(s): UPI, VOA, Radio Marti
- Children: Max Berre
- Website: commissionideas.blogspot.com

Antonio Berre Rey (September 23, 1945, Havana, Cuba – February 3, 2012, Arlington, Virginia) was a Cuban-American writer. In Cuba, he contributed to the country's cultural institutions in the late 1970s; after emigrating in the 1980 Mariel boatlift, he worked in Washington, DC as a program writer for Radio Martí, the U.S. government-funded Spanish-language broadcaster, from 1990 to 2000, and later worked as a web animation developer on federal government contract.

== Early life and family ==
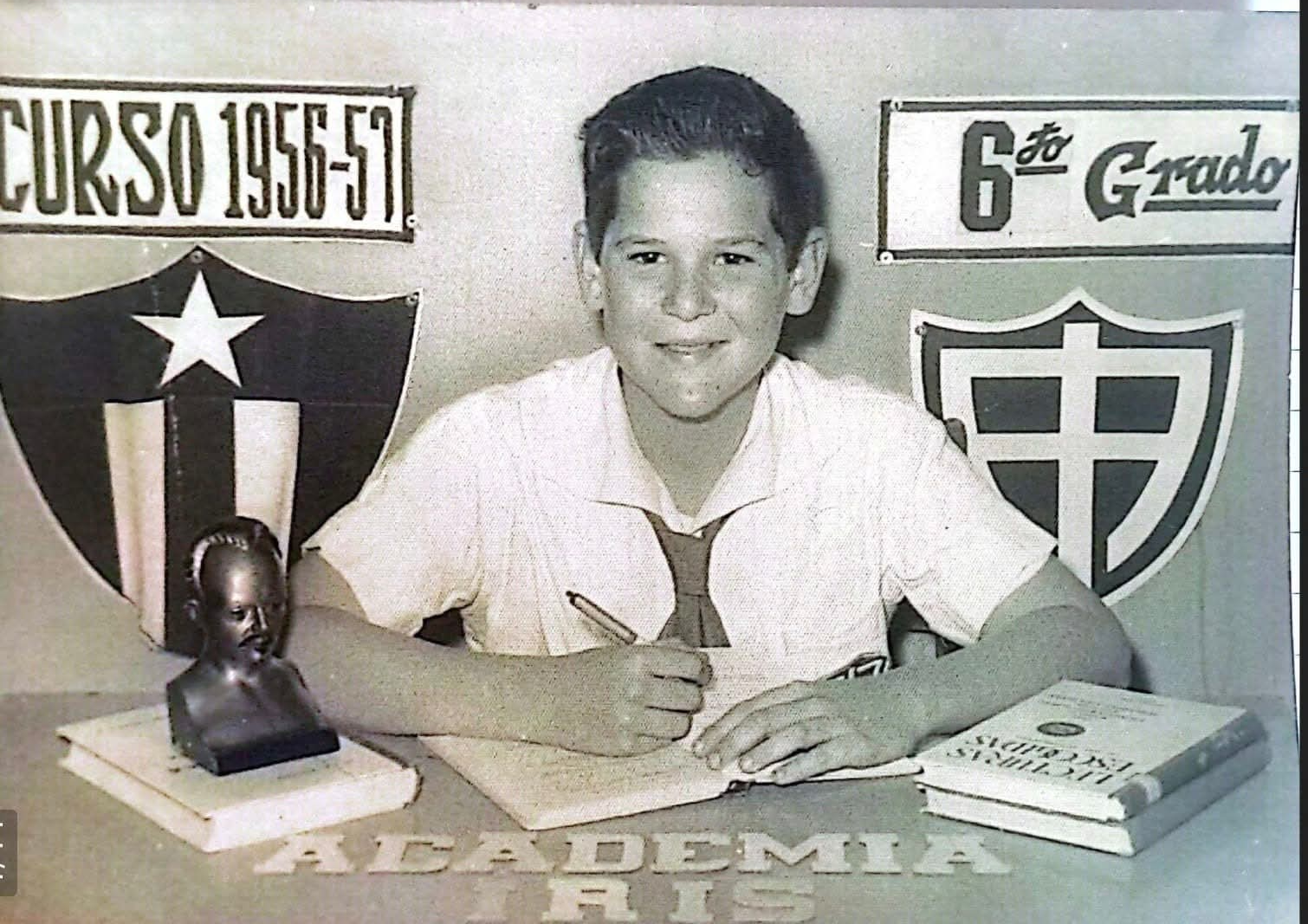

Antonio Berre was born in Havana to Fara Rey (1915–2002), a journalist and historian active from her youth in the anti-Machado student movement La Joven Cuba, and Antonio Berre, a leader in Cuba's Communist youth organization and editor of the PSP-aligned newspaper HOY. His parents married in 1939. His older sister was Rosa Berre (1941–2006), founder of the independent Cuban news agency Cubanet.

== Youth and military service ==
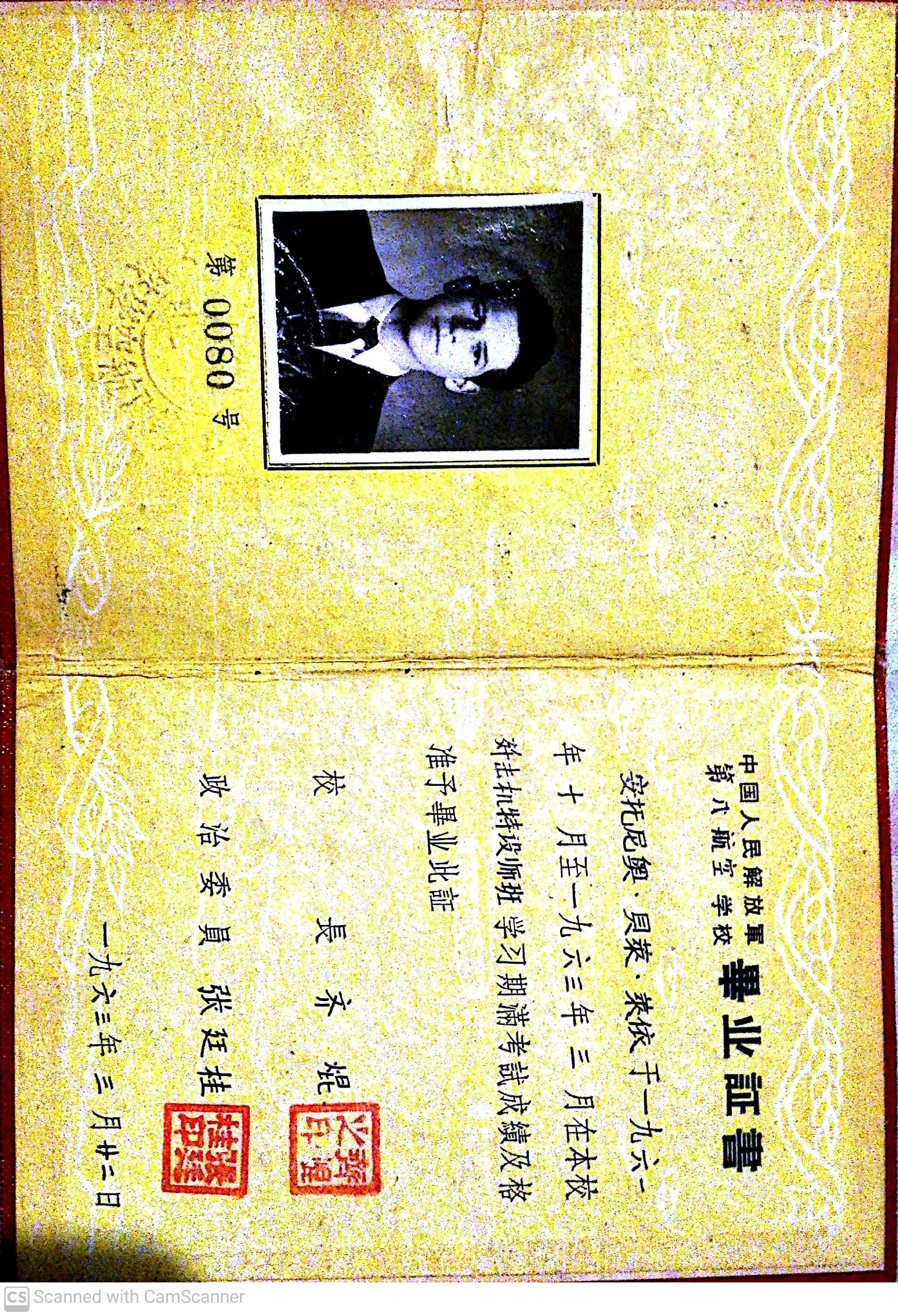
Berre's Chinese PLAAF Miliary Identification and Flight Diploma

In 1961, Berre joined the Cuban armed forces while still a minor. A graduation certificate from the Chinese People's Liberation Army's Eighth Aviation School (中国人民解放军第八航空学校), records that Berre completed a special instructor/training at the school from October 1961 to March 1963, signed by the school's political commissar, Zhang Tinggui.

== Career in Cuba ==
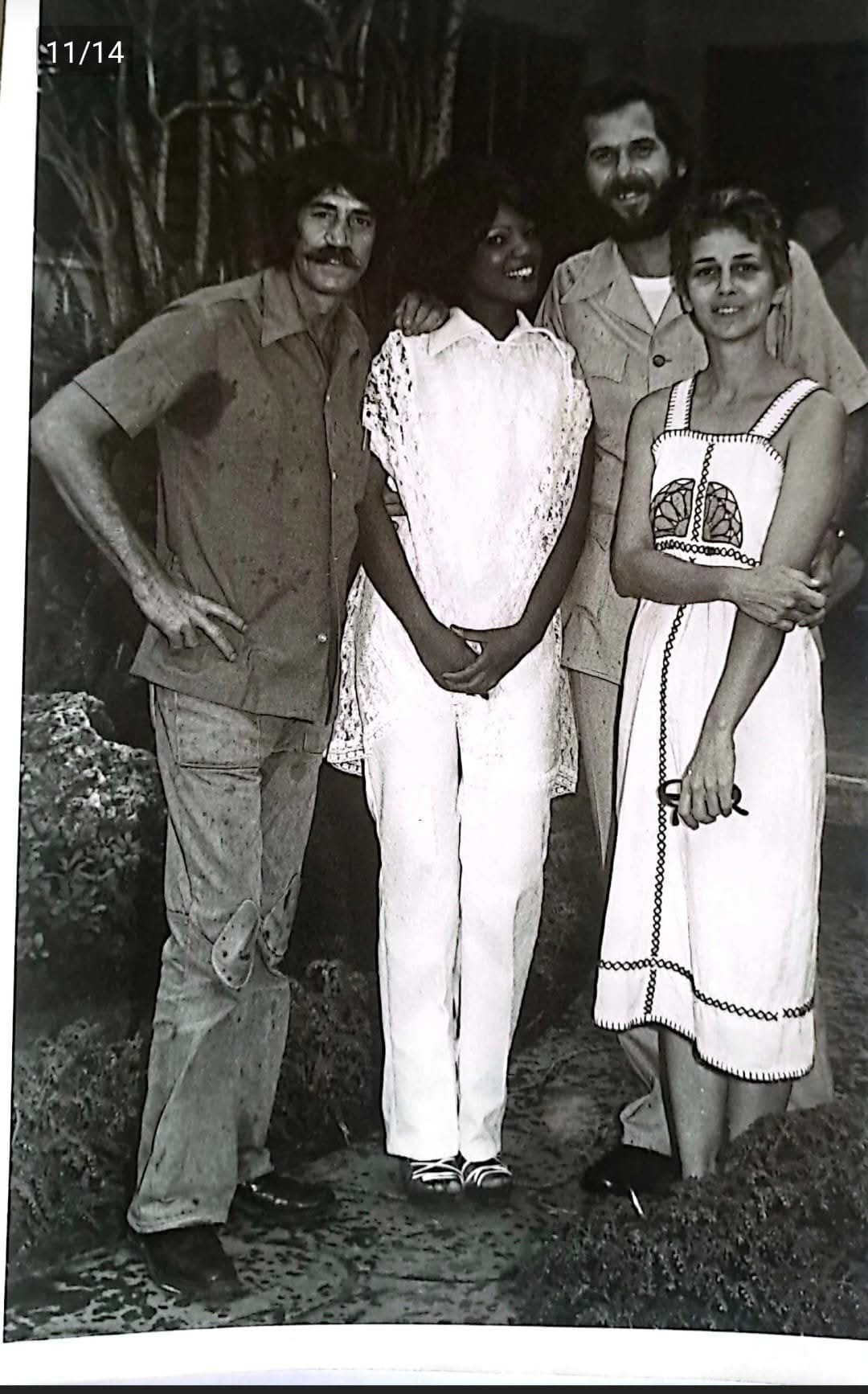
Antonio Berre with Marietta Ulacia, Rosa Berre, and Carlos Quintela in Havana in 1979.

After leaving the military, Berre attended the University of Havana, graduating with a degree in art history.

By the late 1970s Berre was active in Havana's cultural and museum sector. In June 1979 he wrote the introductory text for *Grabados (1797–1858)*, an exhibition of reproduction woodblock prints by the Japanese artist Hiroshige, held at the Galería Amelia Peláez in Havana's Parque Lenin. The exhibition and his authorship of the introduction are recorded in the Cuban National Library's official annual *Bibliografía Cubana 1979*

== Emigration ==
In April 1980, amid the diplomatic crisis at the Peruvian embassy in Havana, Berre, alongside his wife, mother and sister sought asylum there before leaving Cuba later that year as part of the Mariel boatlift.

== US journalism and Radio Martí ==
While originally residing in New Jersey, he later settled in the Washington, DC area (later living in Alexandria, Virginia), where, from 1984 to 1990 he was a Spanish-language journalist for UPI and from 1990 to 2000, he worked as a program writer for Radio Martí, the US government-funded Spanish-language broadcaster aimed at Cuba.

His tenure at Radio Martí placed him among a large cohort of Cuban exile writers and journalists who staffed the station through the 1990s and saw him relocate temporarily to Maimi, Florida. In 2006, he was among more than 470 Cuban exile writers, journalists, and intellectuals who signed an open letter defending three *El Nuevo Herald* colleagues dismissed over their Radio y TV Martí work.

== Personal life ==
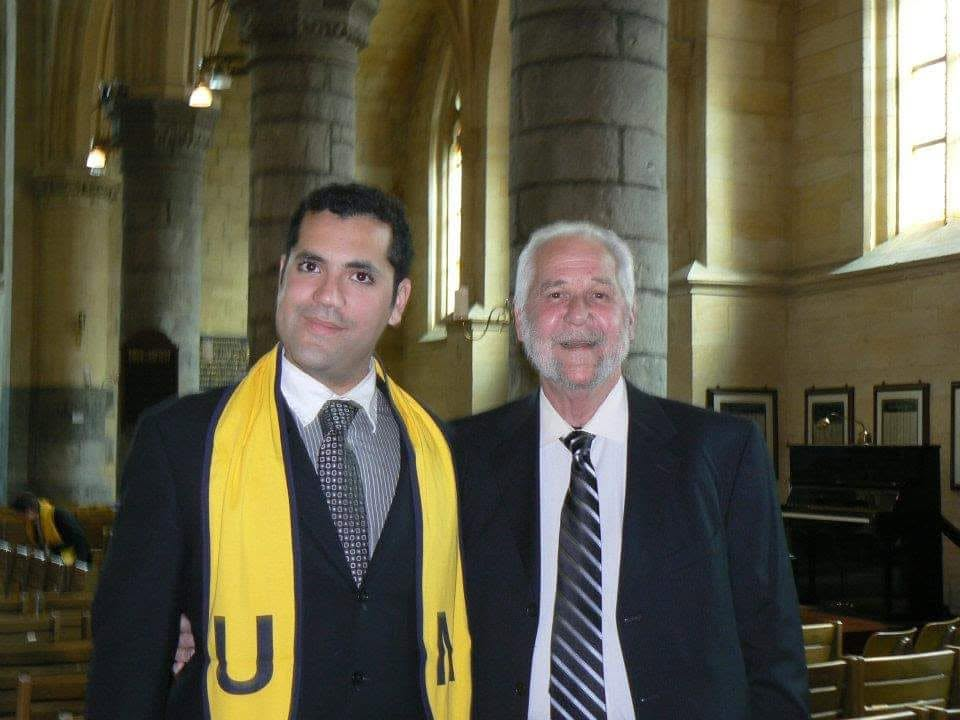
Antonio Berre and Max Berre at Max Berre's 2008 Maastricht University Graduation

Antonio Berre married Marietta Ulacia in 1979, later executive director of the Afro Latin Jazz Alliance (ALJA) and Belongó, in New York City. They later divorced in 1988. He later remarried to Lillian Perez.

Berre had one son, Max Berre, born in 1981, who later became a policy economist.

== Death ==
Antonio Berre died on February 3, 2012, of lung cancer in Arlington, Virginia. It had been his fourth bout with cancer. He was a resident of Alexandria, Virginia at the time of his death.
