= Orlando Luis Pardo Lazo =

Orlando Luis Pardo Lazo (born 1971) is a Cuban writer and artist.

== Biography ==
Orlando Luis Pardo Lazo was born in Havana, Cuba. He graduated from the University of Havana with a degree in biochemistry.

Around 2000 he began work as a free-lance writer, photographer and dissident blogger. In 2010, Lazo founded the independent opinion and literary e-zine Voces, which is Cuba's first digital magazine. At the time there were only about 200 official journalists who were allowed to have blogs by state media. However, there were an additional 100 others identifying themselves as "independent" bloggers, including Lazo, openly expressing criticisms of the Castro regime. Lazo is the editor of Voces and part of a group of well known dissident writers, "The group of writers they have are among the best young Cuban voices anywhere," said Ted Henken, a Baruch College professor who follows the island's bloggers. The magazine is produced in PDF format and copies circulate in Cuba on CDs, flash drives, the domestic network known as the "intranet" and through photocopied paper editions. The government blocks access to the dissidents servers, but people on the island can access the magazine through proxy servers.

Lazo also produces the blog, Boring Home Utopics, which describes itself as "the Collective Memories from a Unique Man in the Brave New Zoociety".

Lazo is the author of Boring Home, awarded the Czech literary award Novelas de Gaveta ("Romány ze šuplíku", Franz Kafka prize). In 2014, he announced the release of an anthology he had edited, an English-language translation of eleven stories from Cuba entitled Cuba in Splinters: Eleven Stories from the New Cuba.

He currently works as a contributing columnist for Sampsonia Way magazine.

== Dissident incidents ==
In 2009, he was involved in an incident and allegedly harassed by the Cuban security agents, along with another Cuban dissident blogger, Yoani Sanchez. Dressed in plain clothes, three security agents forced Lazo and Sanchez into a car without presenting an arrest warrant, and proceeded to beat them. Human rights groups such as the Human Rights Foundation have criticized the arrest, with HRF president Thor Halvorssen calling it "a blatant attempt by the Cuban government to silence independent thought and speech."

On September 1, 2012 Orlando was arrested along with several others by police in Havana. News of his arrest spread quickly through social media, particularly Twitter, and a group formed outside of the jail to protest his arrest. He was released later that same night.

== Bibliography ==
- Boring Home Premio Novela de Gaveta Franz Kafka
- Cuba in Splinters: Eleven Stories from the New Cuba (editor and contributor). New York: OR Books, 2014.
- Espantado de todo me refugio en Trump (author). Editorial Hypermedia, 2019.
