= Independent digital media in Cuba =

Several independent Cuba-based digital media outlets offer alternative voices to censored state-run television, radio, and newspapers. Many of these new media ventures take the form of news outlets or webzines. These outlets may be used as platforms to critique the Socialist government, or to discuss issues or offer entertainment that the state-run media may ignore or consider taboo, such as sports and fashion.

Most online news outlets operate in a legal limbo in which they are neither officially recognized by the state nor prohibited, making it impossible to open corporate bank accounts or put together legal contracts in the names of these outlets. However, enough evidence of how the USA government funding those media using the National Endowment for Democracy, NED, or other similar organizations, is present, even in the official documents of the USA government. Sometimes, the donor is other government ally of the USA government.

In order to reach citizens within the country and avoid government blocking, outlets send their content directly to subscribers via email subscription, or have the digital content delivered physically via USB drives and hard drives. This situation, however, changed since 2018, with the develop of internet services by mobile data in Cuba, and in 2021 most of the websites are available for all the people in Cuba.

== Challenges to digital media in Cuba ==
=== Internet access ===
An estimated 49.1% of Cubans are internet users. Internet penetration in Cuba is among the lowest in the Western Hemisphere, with home internet access available to an estimated 17,7% of the households. Since 2014, the government has opened approximately 830 paid public Wi-Fi hotspots which cost $1 per hour to use or on fixed fee per Mb. The statistics on access also include users who only have access to the state-run Cuban intranet, and not the global internet. There are about 330 internet cafés in Cuba and over 1,000 publicly accessible Wi-Fi points, with typical fees for connecting to the global Internet ranging from $1 to $6 an hour. Cubans can access domestic websites for around US$0.60 an hour. In September 2016, there were around 250,000 connections recorded per day to 1,006 public internet access points.

As of 2016, home broadband connections are not yet allowed for most Cubans, and the government regulates the sale and distribution of internet-related equipment. The Cuban government began allowing Cubans to buy personal computers in early 2008, but prohibitively high costs place computers and internet access beyond the reach of most of the population, meaning an estimated one in 12 Cubans owns a computer. Experts estimate that a small percentage of Cubans periodically have access to the internet via government institutions, foreign embassies, expensive connections in some hotels, and black market sales of minutes by those permitted to have online accounts. As a result, relatively few Cubans on the island are able to read independent digital content online, but email use via mobile phone is becoming more common (see below). However, since 2018 all that situation changed drastically.

=== Censorship ===
Some of the more critical independent news outlets have been blocked for Cuban users by the government. Although the government may tolerate some independent news sites, fears of blocking or arrest prompt many independent journalists and outlets to self-censor. In May 2014, the independent news site 14ymedio was blocked by the Cuban government just hours after the site went live. Users who tried to access 14ymedio were reportedly redirected to yoani$landia, a site that hosted criticism of 14ymedio's founder, Yoani Sanchez, and accused her of being money-hungry. The editors of yoani$landia are believed to be Cuban government officials.

Physically printing independent magazines is illegal, punishable by three months to one year in prison. The law currently does not extend to web-based publications, so several web-based magazines are available in PDF format, online or offline (see below).

== Funding ==
According to Fulton Armstrong, who was the U.S.' most senior intelligence analyst for Latin America from 2000 to 2004, many independent Cuban media outlets are indirectly funded by the U.S., which spends $20 million each year on "democracy promotion" in Cuba. The U.S. National Endowment for Democracy provides funds to the independent media outlet El Estornudo. ADN Cuba, based in Florida, received a grant of $410,710 from the U.S. government agency USAID.

== Methods of distribution ==
=== Online ===
Mobile phone use is becoming more common in Cuba, with an estimated 3.3 million Cuban users. This gives citizens access to email via the standard cell signal provided by ETECSA, the state telecommunications monopoly, and the ability to read popular articles that circulate via email chains. As a result, many independent outlets distribute their content via direct email subscriptions.

Low internet penetration in Cuba forces many digital outlets to send their content to associates in other countries, who post the content on their behalf. Many readers of Cuba's independent digital media are part of the Cuban diaspora in the United States and Europe.

=== Offline ===
Many forms of independent media that would normally be disseminated over the internet are distributed physically via the underground market on USB drives and hard drives. El Paquete Semanal ("The Weekly Package") is received each week by many Cubans as a substitute for broadband internet. The one-terabyte collection of digital content includes television shows, films, smartphone applications, music files, and PDFs, most of which have been downloaded off the island, often illegally. Customers will typically pick and choose which parts of the package they would like that week. El Paquete is distributed via a complex network of hundreds of distributors who deliver the content by hand. It is estimated that half of Cuba's population accesses content through El Paquete, which is run through a network of around 45,000 people.

Several digital magazines, including Vistar and Garbos, are distributed weekly via offline means in addition to being available online (see below).

== List of major independent digital outlets ==
=== News outlets ===
==== Periódico Cubano ====
The second most visited Cuban independent digital news site is Periódico Cubano, founded in January 2017 in the United States.

Since its inception, it has covered the most relevant issues of immigration, the economy, human rights and Cuban national events.

Such complaints led the Cuban Government to include it in 2019 in its list of digital sites blocked within the Island, a situation that the media itself denounced in July of the same year, coinciding, and not coincidentally, with the publication in the Official Gazette of ten measures that limited freedom of expression, including the controversial Decree-Law 370, which clearly established as a violation the act of "disseminating, through public data transmission networks, information contrary to social interest."

==== ADN Cuba ====
ADN Cuba, meaning "Cuba's DNA", is a Spanish website and Facebook page which contains daily videos and blogs contributed by Cuban citizen journalists, activists, artists and cultural creatives living in Cuba. Designed to give independent Cuban cultural creatives an outlet to highlight Cuba's diversity. It was founded in 2017 with the aim of showing Cuba's diversity and serves as a portal and platform for video documentaries work on LGBT issues, human rights, economy, race, and entrepreneurship.. In 2020, The Guardian reported that ADN Cuba had received a $410,710 grant from the US government organisation USAID and that the US spends $20m annually on anti-government media and "democracy promotion" programmes, which critics describe as "regime change" programmes.

According to the committee to Protect Journalists, on 5 July 2019 ADN Cuba said that it had been told by readers that it was blocked in Cuba. The blocking coincided with the publication of Decree 370. ADN Cuba said in a statement that the Cuban government was trying to make independent media such as ADN Cuba and others on the blacklist self-censor and violate journalistic values in favor of echoing the propaganda of the Communist Party that still rules Cuba. It has also said that Cuban laws which prohibited Cubans from "disseminating information contrary to social interest" breached an individual's "right to freedom of opinion and expression".

In 2020, The Guardian reported that ADN Cuba had received a $410,710 grant from the US government organisation USAID and that the US spends $20m annually on anti-government media and "democracy promotion" programmes, which critics describe as "regime change" programmes.

==== Havana Times ====
An online newspaper based in Havana, Havana Times is a daily publication with a Spanish and English edition. It was founded in October 2008 by American expatriate Circles Robinson. A small group of young Cuban writers on the island provide most of the content, but the site also has Cuban contributors in Venezuela, the Dominican Republic, Ecuador and Mexico as well as volunteer translators in Holland, the United States and England. Their articles are mainly viewed by Cubans in text form via email, according to the outlet.

In the words of Baruch College academic Ted Henken, "the project was intended to be an alternative to the official media while avoiding falling into the twin traps of implacable criticism or uncritical praise."

==== 14ymedio ====
14ymedio is Cuba's first independent digital news outlet, founded by blogger Yoani Sanchez in 2014. 14ymedio reports in real time on national and international events that may be relevant to those living in Cuba. Similarly, it seeks to inform those living outside Cuba about the situation on the island.

==== Periodismo de Barrio ====
Periodismo de Barrio (in English: "Neighborhood News" or "News from the Neighborhood") was founded by Cuban journalist Elaine Díaz Rodríguez, with the help of foundation grants. Diaz spent a year as a Nieman Journalism Fellowship at Harvard in 2015. According to the committee to Protect Journalists, the reports in Periodismo de Barrio focus on how climate change and natural disasters affect local communities, and use this theme to hold local government officials accountable without directly criticizing the government. The Castro government has tolerated the outlet thus far, but Díaz has said that several government officials informally accused her of collaborating with the CIA and human rights groups. She responded by detailing the origin of Periodismo de Barrio's funding on her personal website.

=== Digital Magazines ===
==== Garbos ====
Garbos (www.revistagarbos.com) is Cuba's first independent fashion, culture and lifestyle media platform founded in 2014 that includes a monthly digital magazine, website, newsletter and social media pages. It focuses on news and content about fashion, beauty, health & fitness, culture and lifestyle with local news and features about prominent Cuban and international personalities including Carlos Acosta, Ana de Armas and Diana Fuentes.

==== El Estornudo ====
El Estornudo (in English: "the sneeze") is an online magazine of literary journalism and has a similar style to the U.S.'s Vanity Fair. The webzine was founded by Abraham Jiménez Enoa, a University of Havana journalism graduate who had previously been a freelance journalist, in March 2016. Stories include profiles, essays, and critiques official policy.

El Estornudo often addresses official government policies in a roundabout way through lengthy profiles of ordinary Cuban citizens who encounter harassment or ill treatment by the government. According to the committee to Protect Journalists, Jiménez Enoa puts each issue together with the help of a group of literary-minded friends who write for free, and uploads stories and photos from public Wi-Fi access points. The webzine is available online, but Jiménez Enoa has said that his venture lacks the funds to make it available in El Paquete.

==== Vistar ====
A digital magazine of young Cuban culture, Vistar was founded in March 2014 by Robin Pedraja. Vistar is distributed via El Paquete in PDF form. According to its founder, Vistar's website now has 50,000 unique visitors from Cuba and abroad. The webzine is produced in Havana under a Dominican publisher, which allows the magazine to be legally produced in Cuba. The publication focuses mainly on popular music and cultural phenomena within Cuba.

==== Play-Off ====
Play-Off is a monthly sports webzine that was founded in March 2015. It offers sports analysis, photography, statistics, and essays specializing in Cuban sports.

== Catholic publications ==
In addition to independent news outlets that have emerged in recent years, publications from the Catholic Church in Cuba also offer an alternative to the official state mass media. One such example is the magazine Espacio Laical, which is published by the Father Felix Varela Cultural Center of the Archdiocese of Havana. The 96-page magazine is published quarterly in print form, and publishes digital content by email frequently. In addition to covering various religious, social, cultural, political and economic aspects of Cuban life, the publication provides a space for discussion of topics including sovereignty, monetary reform, the functioning of the National Assembly, and the controversial debate on loyal opposition to the Cuban government.

Similarly, the church publication Palabra Nueva was founded in April 1992 and currently has a monthly circulation of 12,000 copies, which are distributed in parishes and chapels of the Archdiocese of Havana. In recent years, in addition to its religious and pastoral content, Palabra Nueva has published articles and analysis on economic and social reality of the country and the reform process initiated under President Raúl Castro.
