= Abraham Jiménez Enoa =

Cuban writer and political activist

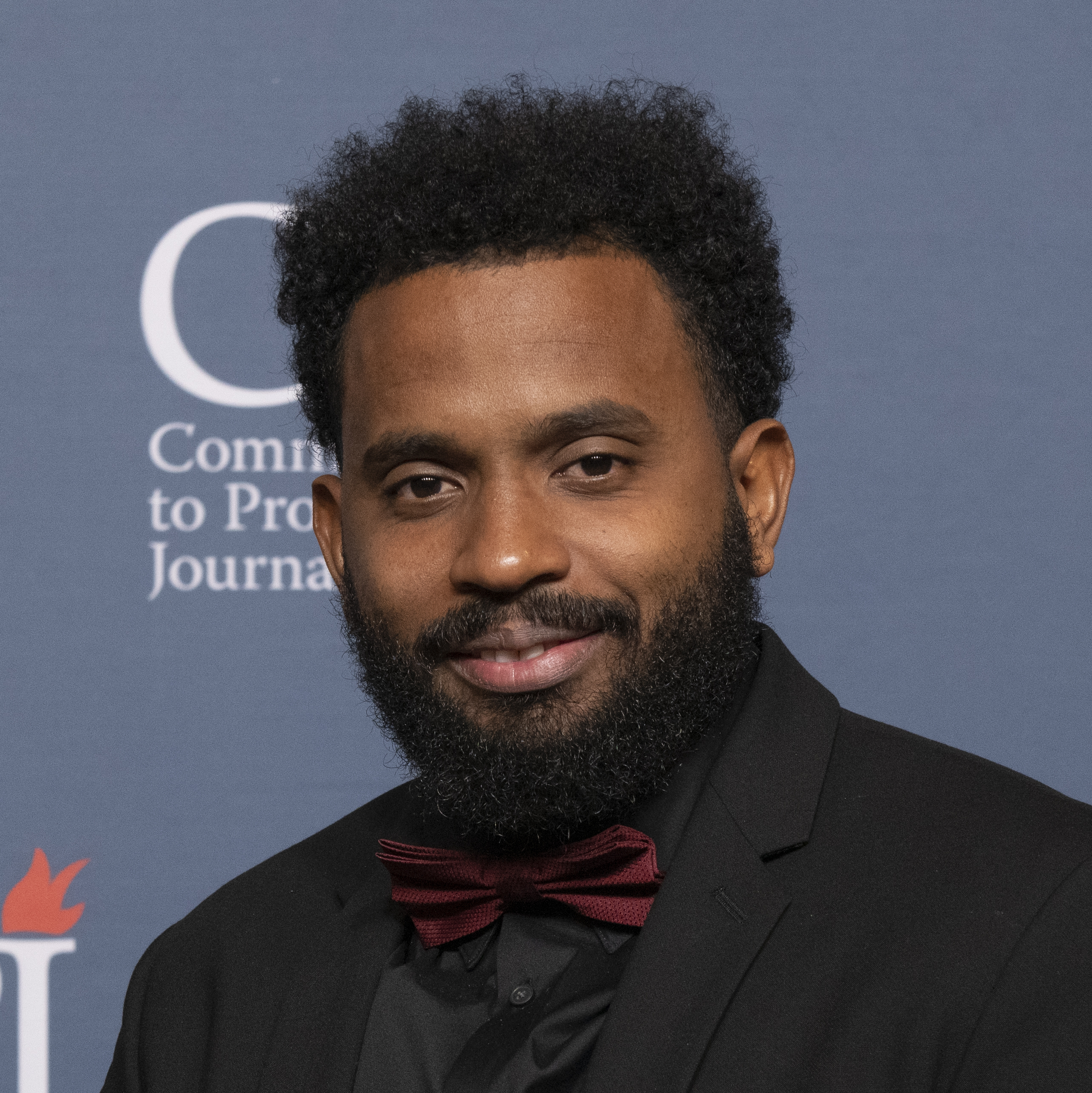
- Born: 1988 (age 37–38); Havana, Cuba
- Occupation: Journalist
- Years active: 2014-present
- Known for: Social activism
- Notable work: La Isla Oculta

Abraham Jiménez Enoa (born 1988) is a freelance Cuban journalist. He is the co-founder of El Estornudo and was the recipient of the 2022 International Press Freedom Award.

== Early life and education ==
Jiménez Enoa was born in Havana into a revolutionary family, where almost everyone was a member of the Communist Party. He describes his youth as growing up within the "automatism of the Revolution." He lived mainly with his grandparents. His paternal grandfather was a bodyguard for Fidel Castro, Ernesto "Che" Guevara and other revolutionary leaders, and lived around the corner from Castro. His father is a retired colonel in the Ministry of Interior (MININT). A poor student in school, he had to attend a high school in the country. He graduated from the University of Havana in 2012 with a degree in journalism. This was followed by service time at the Ministry of Information as an archivist until 2016. While there he began his journalism career by writing sports articles for OnCuba.

== Career ==
He left the MININT in 2016 to found El Estornudo, an independent magazine of narrative journalism. He was sanctioned for leaving the ministry with a regulation that barred him from leaving Cuba for five years. He became an outspoken critic of the regime. He covered taboo topics not otherwise covered, including prostitution, poverty, human rights and racism in Cuba. His writing appeared in both Cuban and international outlets, including The Washington Post (WAPO) and Gatopardo. Jiménez faced increasing harassment because of his writing. His internet was blocked and he and his family were threatened. He was arrested, strip searched, handcuffed and told to stop writing for WAPO. He left El Estornudo in 2020, exhausted and needing to regain his strength. On October 20, 2020, he wrote a column for WAPO entitled "If this is my last column here, it’s because I’ve been imprisoned in Cuba," describing the harassment he and other journalists have been subjected to. In November, 2021, the government gave him an ultimatum: leave or be jailed. He fled to Spain in 2021 where he lives in exile Jiménez Enoa won the 2023 Michael Jacobs Prize for Travel Writing, telling the story of his first year out of Cuba. On August 28, 2025 he wrote an expose' on how Cuba is adapting to the digital age by surveilling and controlling the internet.

=== Narrative style ===
His preferred writing style is the contemporary Latin American literary genre crónica which he used in his first book, La Isla Oculta. He described this genre as being in the mold of writers such as Truman Capote and Rodolfo Walsh (believed to be author of the first non-fiction novel in Spanish). He said this style gives him more time to investigate, meet with sources and "spend time in the places."

== Personal life ==
Enoa lives in Barcelona with his wife and son.
