= Crónica (literary genre) =

Literary genre in Spanish Latin America

Crónica is a literary genre that combines journalistic reporting with a literary flair. Crónica has evolved over centuries, beginning with the early European visitors to the New World. It is unique to and widely used throughout Spanish Latin America. In the 21st century most of the prominent Latin American writers have used this style.

== Description ==
Defining crónica is difficult, as the genre is flexible and evolving. It can be short or long, involving prose or poetry. There are certain broad guidelines that identify and help recognize the genre. The genre has three core attributes: the stories are true; they read as fiction; and they are socially progressive. Crónica crosses the boundaries between fiction and non-fiction, a gray area between literature and journalism; long form works in this genre have been called non-fiction novels. It is a narrative journalism written in a literary style with first-hand testimony, a "journalism that has a distinctive Latin American diacritic, form and social undertaking." There are distinct differences between this and the Brazilian crônica.

== Historical roots ==
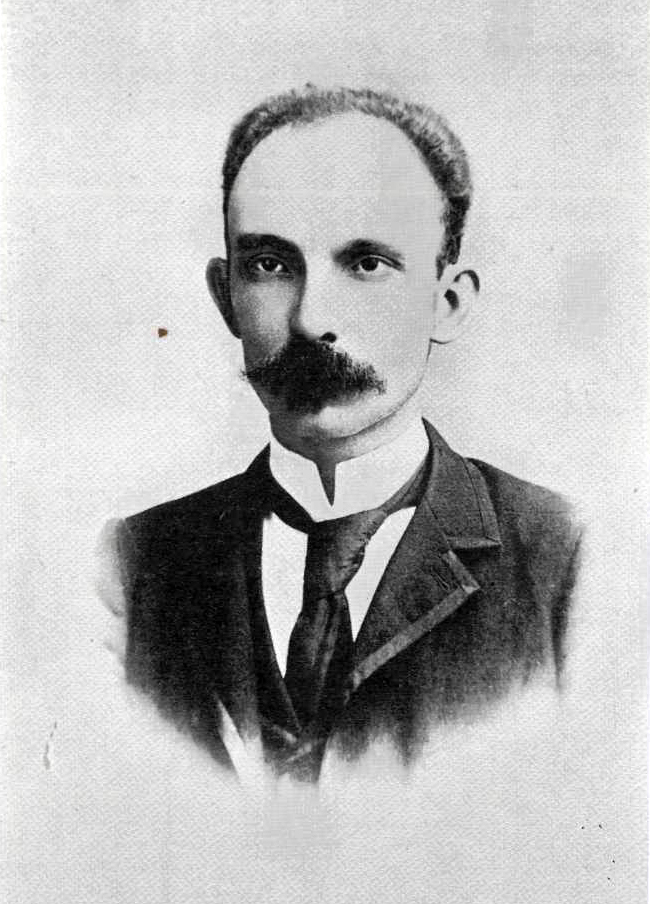
José Martí, a Cuban national hero because of his role in the liberation of his country from Spain; 1892

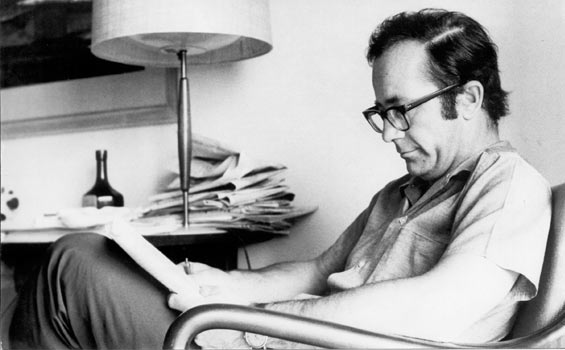
Rodolfo Walsh, credited by some to have written the first non-fiction novel, Operación Masacre

It has been noted that the first colonial histories of Latin America were not written by historians, but by cronistas (chroniclers), whose work should be viewed as "adventures of the imagination." Crónica, a uniquely Latin American hybrid genre, is thought to be descended from this early historiographic tradition, such as is seen in the writings of Antonio Pigafettaand Crónica Mexicayotl, and Crónicas de Indias The contemporary crónica made a comeback in the late 19th and early 20th centuries with the rise of democracies. This was a period when Latin America modernized, leaving behind the colonial past. The style of the cronistas of this period was poetic and humorous, highlighting the problems of the period. Emblematic of this period are Rubén Darío and José Martí. By the 1960s crónicas became more militant, reflecting the Cold War and the Cuban Revolution. This is reflected in Tomás Eloy Martínez's Passion According to Trelew, an account of the massacre of Argentine leftists; and Rodolfo Walsh's Open Letter from a Writer to the Military Junta, published minutes before he was assassinated. Other notable cronistas of this period included Gabriel García Marquez, Elena Poniatowska and Carlos Monsiváis.

== 21st century ==
The crónica remains thriving and evolving, and the 21st century has seen a movement away from the militant issues of the past, including torture, democracy, disappearance and freedom of the press. Less militant but still engaged, the focus has turned to issues such as gay rights, legalization of marijuana, right to water, violence and drug-trafficking cultures, as well as its engagement with the Internet as platform for communication and the desencarto (disenchantment) of the post-dictatorship era. Notable works of 21st century cronistas include Francisco Goldman's The Interior Circuit and Abraham Jiménez Enoa's La Isla Oculta

Almost all urban cronistas are also journalists and many have also written fiction. Some are featured on radio and television.

== Narrative Style ==
An example from Rodolfo Walsh runs thus:

"From the wide window on the tenth floor you can see over the city in the evening, the pale lights of the river. From here it's easy to love, if even just momentarily, Buenos Aires. But it's not any conceivable form of love that has brought us together.

The colonel is looking for names, papers that perhaps I might have.

I'm looking for a death, a place on the map. It's not really a search, it's barely a fantasy: the type of perverse fantasy that some suspect might occur to me.

Some day (I think in moments of anger) I'll go and look for her. She doesn't mean anything to me, but I'll go anyway, following the mystery of her death, behind her remains that rot slowly in some remote cemetery. If I find her, fresh high waves of anger, fear and frustrated love will rise, powerful vengeful waves, and for a moment I won't feel alone any more, I won't feel like a wrecked, bitter, forgotten shadow.

The colonel knows where she is.

He moves with ease on the floor of opulent furniture, decorated with ivory and bronze, with plates by Meissen and Cantón. I smile at the false Jongkind, the suspect Fígari. I think of the look on his face if I told him who makes Jongkind, but instead I compliment his whiskey.

He drinks with vigor, with health, with enthusiasm, with happiness, with superiority, with contempt. His face changes and changes, while his fat hands slowly turn the glass." - (Excerpt translated from Rodolfo Walsh's "Esa mujer")

== See also ==
- Crónica de Indias – a type of crónica
