= José Conrado =

- Occupation: Priest

José Conrado Rodríguez Alegre, a Cuban priest from the parish of Santa Teresita del Niño Jesús, in Santiago de Cuba, is best known for his strongly worded open letter in 2009 to Cuban President Raúl Castro. The letter condemns what Conrado says are the social problems, the restrictions on liberty and the increasing threats and interrogations that have been directed at his parishioners. Conrado had written a similar open letter to Fidel Castro in 1994.

Conrado, considered one of the most outspoken of the church figures in Cuba, has been called the "Cardinal of the people". After a visit to see the Pope in 1998, Conrado stated, "The fundamental change is the protagonism of the Cuban people after years of having to hide what they think. What has happened in Cuba is a genuine miracle. It's the resurrection of the Cuban people."

An interview with Conrado by journalist Emio de Armas won third place for the Catholic Journalist's Best News Writing National/International Event, an article that, despite the restrictions on the press imposed by the Cuban government, gives an account by Conrado where he details the arrest and beatings of dissidents by the Cuban police inside his church.

Conrado also has been interviewed in 2009 by Pierantonio Micciarelli, an italian film-maker, for his documentary "SOY LA OTRA CUBA" where he described a very different reality from the one displayed by the official propaganda.

== Letter to Raul Castro ==
On February 5, 2009, Conrado wrote an open letter to Cuban president Raúl Castro Ruz which was published in the digital magazine, Contodos.

Yoani Sánchez and Reinaldo Escobar traveled to Santiago de Cuba the weekend before the letter was released and spent several days there, meeting with Conrado. During the same visit they held a blogger meeting with young people there, and Sánchez put her Ortega y Gasset award in the sanctuary of the Virgin of Charity of Cobre, where “the long arm of the censor does not enter.” Excerpts from the letter were published on the Huffington Post.
