= Conrado Dayrit =

Filipino scientist (1919–2007)

Conrado Dayrit (May 31, 1919 – October 5, 2007) was a Filipino medical doctor and scientist known for his advocacy of coconut oil for which he was dubbed "Dr. Coconut" and "Father of VCO" (Virgin Coconut Oil). He was one of the six co-founders and a president of the Philippine Heart Association, a president of the Federation of Asian Scientific Academies and Societies, a president of the Philippine National Academy of Science and Technology, and an emeritus professor of pharmacology at the University of the Philippines College of Medicine. He performed pioneering tests on the efficacy of coconut oil on HIV and wrote about coconut oil's health benefits.

== Selected works ==
- Dayrit, Conrado S. (2005). The Truth About Coconut Oil – The Drugstore in a Bottle. Anvil. ISBN 978-971-27-1695-9..
