= Nicolas Petit (academic) =

French Belgian academic

- Born: December 29, 1978 (age 47); Paris, France
- Occupations: Professor at the European University Institute (EUI) and Invited Professor, George Mason University

Academic background
- Education: University of Liege
- Thesis: Oligopolies and Tacit Collusion in European Law (2007)

Academic work
- Discipline: Law

Nicolas Petit (born 29 December 1978 in Paris, France) is a French Belgian academic specializing in competition policy, economic regulation, law and technology. He is Professor at the European University Institute, Florence, Italy, in the Department of Law and Invited Professor, George Mason University School of Law. Previously, he was Joint Chair with the Department of Law and the Robert Schuman Center for Advanced Studies.

== Career ==
Petit studied law at University of Paris Descartes (Paris V) and the University of Paris II Pathéon-Assas before receiving his LL.M from the College of Europe. He completed his PhD in law at the University of Liege in 2007.

Petit has been full professor at the Law School of the University of Liege and part-time/panel judge of the Belgian Competition Authority. He was also an Associate at Howrey LLP, Brussels and Clerk at the Commercial Chamber of the French Supreme Court. He became a member of Harvard Law School’s Visiting Researcher Programme in 2005 and was a visiting fellow at Stanford University Hoover Institution.

In 2020, Petit joined the European University Institute as Joint Chair in Competition Law and professor at the European University Institute’s Robert Schuman Center for Advanced Studies (RSCAS). He then transferred to Full Professor in the EUI Law Department, of which he became Head of Department in 2023. He is also a visiting professor at the College of Europe in Bruges and at George Mason University Antonin Scalia School of Law.

From 2018 to 2020, Petit has been a member of the European Commission High Level Expert Group on Artificial Intelligence.

In 2025, Petit wrote the Constitution of Innovation with Nobel Prize economist Bengt Holmström and Luis Garicano. In 2026, he was invited to join the Rhine Group, an initiative designed to accelerate Europe's progress towards the technology frontier, and sponsored by former ECB president and Italian Prime Minister Mario Draghi and Stripe's CEO Patrick Collison.

Petit is the founder of the specialist blog Chillin'Competition and of the Brussels School of Competition, and organization which develops educational programs in competition law and economics as well as artificial intelligence policy.

== Publications ==
In 2020, he published a book on big tech companies in which he coined the term "moligopoly". The book suggests substantial levels of broad-based competition amongst some big tech firms inconsistent with findings of monopoly behavior. In her review, economist Diane Coyle wrote that the book is a "useful warning that we should think carefully and in detail about what harms we believe Big Tech is causing", and that it is "a distinctive corrective against the current tendency toward groupthink on this subject". Petit predicted emerging competitive tendencies in the tech world distinct from the early perceptions used in the policymaking structure to advance law and regulatory reform towards digital platforms.

=== Additional publications ===
- "Innovation Competition, Unilateral Effects and Merger Policy", Antitrust Law Journal, 2019, Vol. 82, No. 3, pp. 876–77
- "The Misguided Assault on the Consumer Welfare Standard in the Age of Platform Markets", Review of Industrial Organization, 2019, Vol. 54, No. 4, pp. 741–774
- Auer, D.and Petit, N., "Two-Sided Markets and the Challenge of Turning Economic Theory into Antitrust Policy", Antitrust Bulletin, 2015, Vol. 60, No. 4
- Petit, N., "The Oligopoly Problem in EU Competition Law" (February 5, 2012) in Research Handbook in European Competition Law, I. Liannos and D. Geradin eds., Edward Elgar, 2013
- Damien, G., Layne-Farrar, A., and Petit, N., EU Competition Law and Economics, Oxford: Oxford University Press, 2012
- Droit européen de la concurrence, Paris: Librairie générale de droit et de jurisprudence, 2013, 2018 and 2020 (Winner of French Constitutional Council's Best Law Book of the Year)

== Awards ==
In 2017 the Global Competition Review (GCR) awarded him for "academic excellence".

In 2013 he was awarded the prize for the best law book at the French Supreme Court, moreover several of his papers have been cited officially in court.
