= Brussels Study Center =

Academic Institution

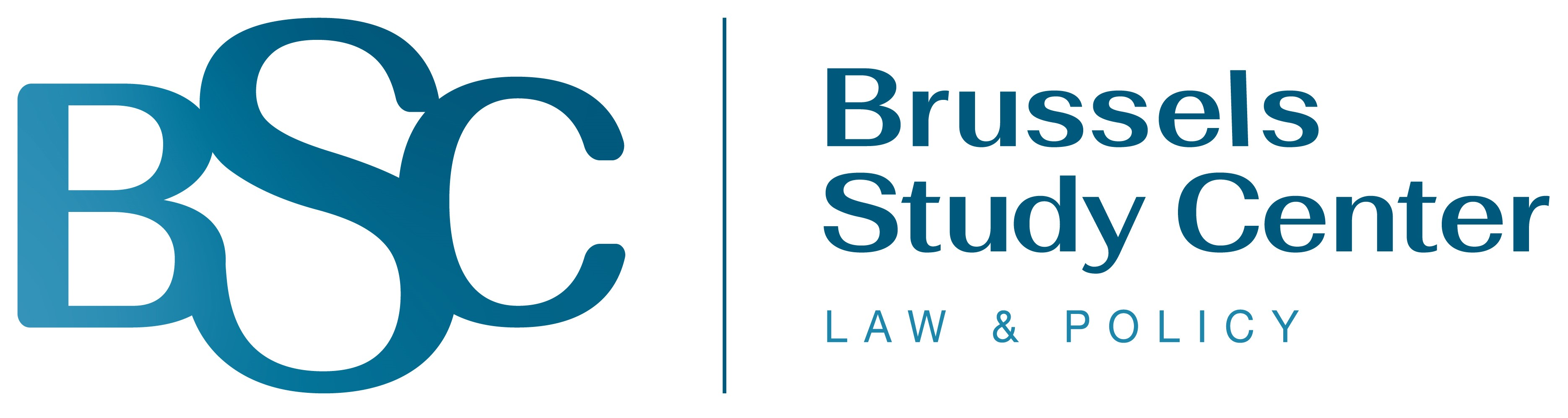
BSC Official Logo

The Brussels Study Center (formerly Brussels School of Competition) is an independent academic foundation based in Brussels, Belgium. It specializes in postgraduate and executive education in law, economics, and technology, with a particular focus on competition law and the legal implications of artificial intelligence. The educational programs are organized by the Brussels Study Center in collaboration with the University of Liège.

== History and mission ==
The Brussels School of Competition was founded in 2010 by Charles Gheur, Nicolas Petit and Philippe Lambrecht, Secretary-General of the Federation of Entreprises in Belgium.

Its primary objective was to foster education, compliance and research in the field of competition law and economics. The courses organized by the BSC cover the main themes related to this field: including cartels, vertical restraints, state aid, mergers, abuse of dominance, etc. The Brussels Study Center collaborates with the University of Liège in delivering the programmes. These programmes are accredited by the University of Liège, ensuring their academic recognition and quality standards.

The organization was originally established within the Federation of Enterprises in Belgium and became an independent foundation in 2016. In 2017, it introduced the Executive Master in Law & Artificial Intelligence, one of the early European programs addressing the relationship between law, policy, and artificial intelligence technologies.

In 2024, the institution adopted the name Brussels Study Center, replacing its former name, Brussels School of Competition, to reflect an expansion of its academic focus beyond competition law.

The BSC offers interdisciplinary and practice-oriented programs for lawyers, economists, public officials and other professionals. It facilitates academic dialogue and international collaboration through its educational and research activities.

== Academic programmes ==
The Brussels Study Center offers two postgraduate programmes.

- The LL.M. in Competition Law and Economics is a one-year programme that combines legal and economic perspectives on competition law. It consists of ten modules and four clinical seminars and leads to a 32-credit interuniversity certificate.
- The Executive Master in Law and Artificial Intelligence focuses on the legal, ethical, and regulatory dimensions of artificial intelligence and digital technologies. The curriculum includes 25 modules organised into four thematic blocks and carries 15 credits.

Both programmes are taught in English and delivered in a hybrid format, allowing participants to attend in person in Brussels or online via live and recorded sessions.

Graduation ceremony

A graduation ceremony takes place at the end of each academic year. On this occasion, a guest speaker is invited to deliver a keynote address to the graduating class. Keynote speakers are listed by academic year:

- 2010 – 2011: Jacques Steenbergen
- 2011 – 2012: Jacques Steenbergen
- 2012 – 2013: Johan Vande Lanotte
- 2013 – 2014: William Kovacic
- 2014 – 2015: Ian Forrester
- 2015 – 2016: Paul Nihoul
- 2016 – 2017: Christopher Bellamy
- 2017 – 2018: Sophie Dutordoir
- 2018 – 2019: Melchior Wathelet
- 2019 – 2020: (The ceremony was not held that year due to the Covid pandemic)
- 2020 – 2021: Pierre Régibeau
- 2021 – 2022: Olivier Guersent
- 2022 – 2023: Cani Fernandez
- 2023 – 2024: Didier Reynders
- 2024 – 2025: Luis Garicano

== Faculty ==
The faculty consists out of experts from academia, European institutions and law firms, including:

- Nicolas Petit – European University Institute
- William Kovacic - George Washington University
- Jacques Steenbergen - Former President of the Belgian Competition Authority

== Recognition and partners ==
The Brussels School of Competition (BSC) collaborates with a range of academic, institutional, and professional partners. Its academic programs are co-organized with the University of Liège and are accredited with ECTS credits in accordance with the Bologna Process.

The BSC maintains relationships with several organizations and institutions, including:

- The Liège Competition and Innovation Institute
- International law firms, including Cleary Gottlieb and Sheppard Mullin
- Economic consultancies such as Compass Lexecon and RBB Economics
- Academic institutions including the Université de Saint-Louis
