= Jesús Díaz (writer) =

Cuban writer (1941–2002)

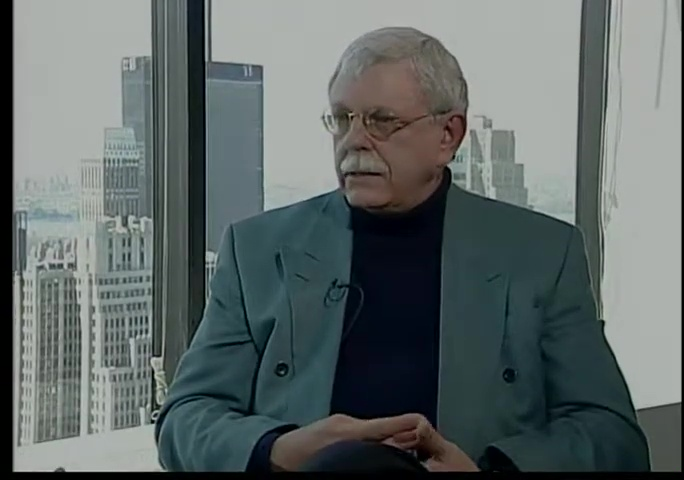
Diaz on CUNY TV's Charlando con Cervantes, 1998

Jesús Díaz (1941–2002) was a Cuban writer and filmmaker.

His most well known work was his first novel "Los anos duros" published in 1966. He was also the founder of the magazine Encuentro which published the work of Cuban expatriots.

He died in May 2002 in Madrid, Spain.
