= Yoani Sánchez =

Cuban blogger, journalist (born 1975)

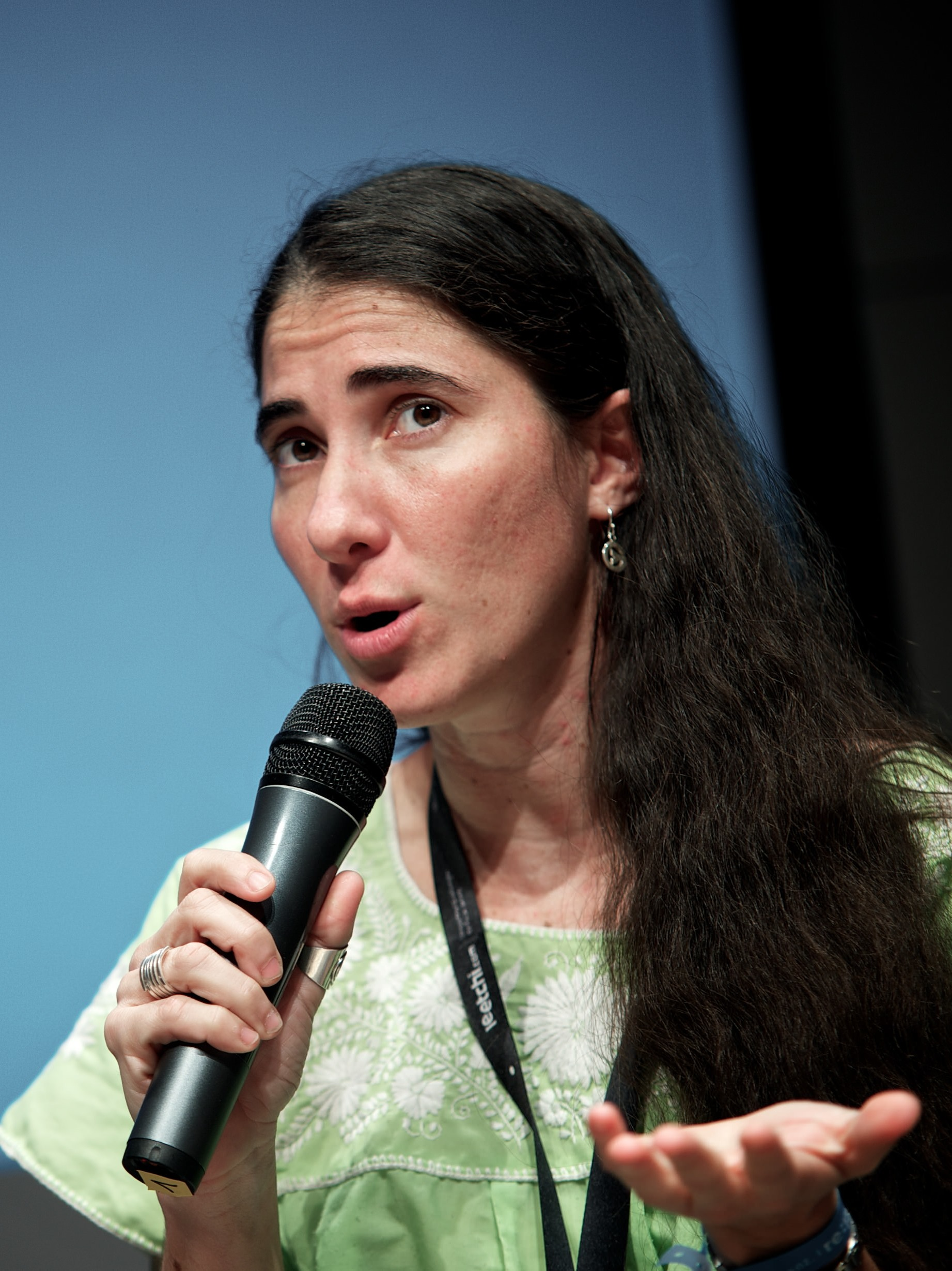
- Sánchez in 2013
- Born: Yoani María Sánchez Cordero; September 4, 1975 (age 51); Havana, Cuba
- Occupations: Blogger; programmer; philologist
- Spouse: Reinaldo Escobar (m. 1993)
- Children: 1
- Website: Generation Y website

Yoani María Sánchez Cordero (born September 4, 1975) is a Cuban blogger who has achieved international fame and multiple international awards for her critical portrayal of life in Cuba under its current government.

Sánchez attended primary school during the affluent time when the Soviet Union was providing considerable aid to Cuba. However, her high school and university education coincided with the loss of financial aid to Cuba following the Soviet Union's collapse, creating a highly public educational system and style of living that subsequently left Sánchez with a strong need for personal privacy. Sánchez's university education left her with two understandings; first, that she had acquired a disgust for "high culture", and second that she no longer had an interest in philology, her chosen field of university study.

Sánchez, disillusioned with her home country, left Cuba for Switzerland in 2002, and it was during this time that she became interested in computer science. When she finally returned to Cuba, Sánchez helped to establish Contodos, a magazine that continues to act as a forum for Cuban free expression, and a vehicle for reporting news. Sánchez is best known for her blog, Generación Y (Generation Y); which, despite censorship in Cuba, she is able to publish by e-mailing the blog entries to friends outside the country who then post them online. The blog is translated and available in 17 languages.

Time magazine listed her as one of the world's 100 most influential people in 2008, stating that "under the nose of a regime that has never tolerated dissent, Sánchez has practiced what paper-bound journalists in her country cannot; freedom of speech". In November 2009, U.S. President Barack Obama, wrote that her blog "provides the world a unique window into the realities of daily life in Cuba" and applauded her efforts to "empower fellow Cubans to express themselves through the use of technology".

== Biography ==
Yoani Sánchez was born September 4, 1975, in central Havana, Cuba, one of two daughters, to William Sánchez and Maria Eumelia Cordero. Her father worked, as his father had before him, on the state railroad system, first as a laborer and later as an engineer. As the nation's railroad system fell apart after the collapse of communism in Europe, William Sánchez, out of work along with many of his colleagues, became a bicycle repairman.

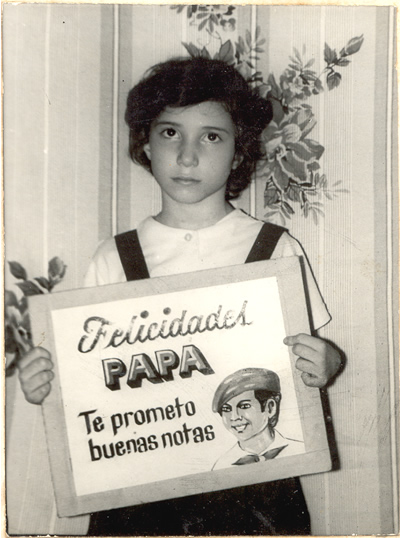
Sánchez as a child in 1982

Sánchez grew up and attended school in central Havana during the years when the Soviet Union was supporting the island and its communist revolution with tangible aid, nearly $9 billion in the final year. Sánchez's secondary and university years coincided with the collapse of the Soviet Union and the loss of its subsidies to Cuba that had for nearly three decades provided about 80 percent of Cuba's international trade. During her high school years, she attended a "school in the countryside" about which she wrote:

I left high school in the countryside feeling that nothing belonged to me, not even my body. Living in shelters creates the sensation that your whole life, your privacy, your personal possessions and even your nakedness has become public property. "Sharing" is the obligatory word and it comes to seem normal not to be able—ever—to be alone. After years of mobilizations, agricultural camps, and a sad school in Alquízar, I needed an overdose of privacy.

Sánchez studied for two years in the Instituto Pedagógico with a major in Spanish literature. She transferred to the Faculty of Arts and Letters in 1995, and gave birth to her son in August of that year. Sánchez graduated within five years with a degree in Hispanic philology and a specialty in contemporary Latin American literature. Her thesis was titled Words Under Pressure. A Study of the Literature of Dictatorship in Latin America. Sánchez says that by the end of her university studies she "understood two things: the first, that the world of intellectualism and high culture disgusted me and the saddest, that I no longer wanted to be a philologist." By September 2000, she had found a job with Editorial Gente Nueva, a publisher of children's literature. After a short period of employment with Gente Nueva, Sánchez asked to be released from her position, then focused on a higher paying job as a freelance Spanish instructor for German tourists visiting Havana. According to Sánchez, this was during a time "when engineers preferred to drive taxis, teachers worked as hotel desk clerks, and store counters were tended by neurosurgeons or nuclear physicists."

In 2002, claiming disillusionment with her home country, Sánchez decided to leave Cuba and emigrated to Switzerland. She was eventually joined by her son and husband. Two years later she decided to return to Cuba citing "family reasons". However, since she had been out of the country for more than eleven months without special permission, Sánchez had lost the right to return. Sánchez states that she then flew home to Cuba "for a two-week family visit" on a round-trip ticket, and by destroying her passport was able to avoid being forced on a plane back to Switzerland. The Cuban government says that she was granted a waiver allowing her to recover her permanent resident status in Cuba. She finally resettled in Havana. During this time, Sánchez discovered her current profession, computer science. In 2004, she founded, together with a group of Cubans – all based on the island – a magazine, Consenso, based on reflection and debate. She also helped establish the web portal Desde Cuba (From Cuba), an on-line magazine and collection of individual blogs, of which Sánchez's was the first. Sánchez began to sign her posts in 2008, abandoning anonymous blogging. That year, she requested permission to travel to Spain to receive the Ortega y Gasset Journalism Award but permission was denied. Her request for permission to travel to an international documentary film festival in Prague, of which she was a member of the jury, was also denied.

In October 2009, Sánchez was awarded Columbia University's "Maria Moors Cabot prize" and was invited to New York to accept the award. The Cuban government denied her permission to attend. Nicholas Lemann, dean of Columbia's Graduate School of Journalism, criticized the decision, stating that "The Cuban government ought to value Ms. Sánchez's work as a sign that young Cubans are ready to take Cuba into a better future – one that will have the free press the Cuban people deserve."

=== A journey to South America and Europe ===
Sánchez flew to Prague in the Czech Republic, where she was received by the Minister of Foreign Affairs and former presidential candidate Karel Schwarzenberg, who was particularly interested in discussing the reforms that took place in Cuba during 2012 and the state of civil society there. Schwarzenberg remarked that he was not as enthusiastic regarding the reforms as representatives of some other countries, as he could still remember reforms from the communist era in former Czechoslovakia that "changed nothing, but to the West looked amazing".

Sánchez was also a guest of the One World human rights festival, organized by non-profit humanitarian organization People in Need. A film by Swiss director Barbara Miller, Forbidden Voices: How to Start a Revolution with a Laptop, was among the films shown during the festival. The film presents three women – one of them being Sánchez – who use blogs and social networks to spread information from their countries living under authoritarian regimes, thus fighting for women's rights or human rights in general. Sánchez was also invited to a discussion at the Charles University about independent journalism in Cuba.

== Blogging and digital publishing ==
Sánchez established the magazine Consenso (later named Contodos) on her return from Switzerland. The magazine continues to be published today as a "forum for free expression" from the island, and as a vehicle for the reporting of news such as Father Jose Conrado's February 2009 letter to Raúl Castro Ruz. The magazine's editorial board consists of Dimas Castellanos, Miriam Celaya, Marta Cortízas, Reinaldo Escobar, Eugenio Leal, and Yoani Sánchez. Sánchez is also involved with the digital magazine Convivencia.

In January–February 2007, Sánchez participated in an event referred to as the "debate of the intellectuals", described as a "discussion among intellectuals and writers on Cuba's repressive cultural policies". She, along with several others, was not allowed into the formal conference being held in the House of the Americas. The debate of those who were excluded, and included, in the formal sessions, was captured in several hundred pages of emails exchanged between the participants. These emails—exchanged by over one hundred participants—are preserved in the digital magazine Contodos under the title Polémica Intellectual 2007.

According to Sánchez, what pushed her to write a blog was the bad taste left at the end of the controversy of the intellectuals in January 2007. The meeting in the House of the Americas would try to channel and institutionalize a debate that had been raising the temperature of Cuban emails for a couple of weeks already. A select list of guests began entering the "Che Guevara Room", while our "group of impertinents" watched, from outside, as midnight arrived. The protesters were blocked from entering by the custodians in order to keep them from debating and discussing their encounters with "censorship and dogmatism". The protesters chanted "Desiderio, Desiderio, hear my criteria", but this had no effect, while inside, the voice of the Minister of Culture repeated the idea that in a place under siege, dissent is treason. Sánchez believed that the "debate was hijacked by the institutions, jailed by an academic world full of concepts and fancy words, and condemned to take the course of the imminent conference of the UNEAC [Cuban Writers and Artists Union].

In the end the protesters left with the conviction that they could not wait to be allowed inside for the next debate. For Sánchez, this added a push to start what she terms "this exorcism called Generation Y". Sánchez launched her blog, Generation Y, on April 9, 2007. The national baseball playoffs were underway, and the first post used the baseball fever to compare what Cubans are allowed to shout, and display on homemade posters, "Santiago, Go Santiago!" and what they are not: "Internet for all!" The blog was hosted in Germany on an Internet domain by Cronon AG, and was designed by Sánchez. Later, the blog was transferred to WordPress, and was eventually upgraded to allow comments by readers.

When the blog had been active for six months, Sánchez expressed her reason for blogging, saying that her initial inspiration had been to create an aid to help her deal with the frustrations she felt with the situation in Cuba, and of trying to go along with the advice of friends who suggested she be cautious and wait, rather than more "noble motives". She tried "silence and evasion", yoga, tai chi, and going to the gym, all with no results. She finally found a means to express these frustrations, by blogging. Even so, she admits "I can both get discouraged have sudden starts. I alternate between "It's working!" to "It's not worth the pain"; alerting her readers to not be "surprised if the catharsis rises in tone, if I become incendiary, or show a streak of pessimism".

According to Sánchez, when she began blogging, Cubans, by law, were not allowed into tourist hotels, but with her "European" appearance, and ability to speak German, she routinely managed to get past the gatekeepers to work on her blog. Due to the difficulties in accessing the Internet, her access speed is determined by the speed of the bus that connects to La Víbora at Línea and G. "Each post depends on a countless chain of events that normally don't go well. From my isolated PC to a flash memory and then to the public space of a cybercafé or a hotel. For this, without detailing all the complications, the elevator does not work, the gatekeeper asks me to show my passport to sit at the computer, or there are frustrations to sign on, plus the slow-speeds imposed by proxies, filters and keylogger."

=== The Huffington Post blog ===
In November 2008, Sánchez was invited to post her blog entries on The Huffington Post, and she began writing occasional posts that described life in Cuba. Sánchez says she has strived to maintain a respectful tone, and she asks that those who leave comments on her blog do so as well.

In an interview with journalist Ted Henken published in Poder360, she explained this view, saying:

I refuse to use incendiary language, defamation, or harangues, because that only exacerbates the cycle of intolerance that is an obstacle to reasoned debate. Cuba is a very diverse country. You walk out into the street, and you not only find diversity of races but also of opinions. The official press spends all its time trying to make us believe that this is a very monolithic country, that we all think the same, and it does so with a dose of revolutionary violence and ideological aggressiveness that is paralyzing. We have to find a way to put a stop to this never-ending cycle, to this spiral of aggression that is very characteristic of Cuban journalism.

=== International attention ===
On October 9, 2007, Reuters published an article about bloggers in Cuba: "Cubans go to unusual lengths to post blogs"; Sánchez featured prominently in the article. The article was republished by media around the world, and was followed by a Wall Street Journal article on December 22, 2007, called "Cuban Revolution: Yoani Sánchez fights tropical totalitarianism, one blog post at a time". Sánchez has also appeared in interviews by Spain's El País newspaper; in an article in Germany's Die Zeit; and in The New York Times.

=== Generation Y blocked ===
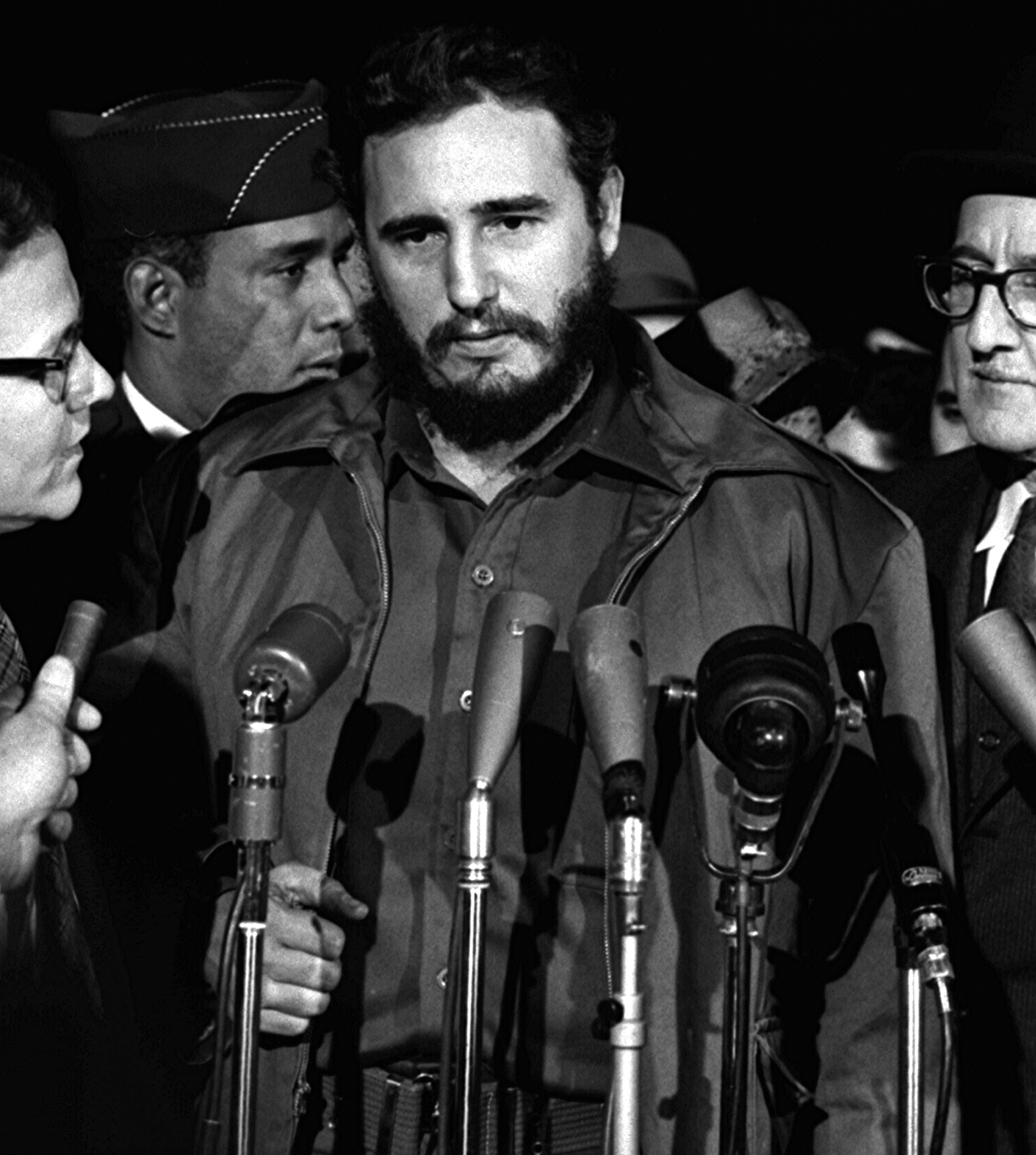
Fidel Castro quoted Sánchez's blog in the prologue of the book Fidel, Bolivia y algo más.

On March 26, 2008, Sánchez announced to her readers that the recent problems accessing her blog appeared to be a deliberate action on the part of government censors to block access to her blog and the other blogs on the desdecuba.com website. While debate swirled back and forth on the web about whether the site was actually blocked, Sánchez stated that Generation Y could not be accessed in Cuba for the past several years. The debate about whether this was a year-long plus "fluke" or some "glitch" in the software, seemed to be resolved about a year after the site became unavailable. Comments made by a Cuban State Security agent in an interview published on March 19, 2009, in the digital magazine Kaos en la Red, where "Agent Miguel" stated, "I know State Security officials who literally prophesied that blocking the blog Generation Y within the country would, in a short time, cause the launching of Madame Sánchez into the stardom of the manipulative media campaign against Cuba. Regardless of these prophesies, they did it and now they're paying the price."

Sánchez was well known by this time and the attempt to censor her by the sudden government shutdown of her blog attracted more international attention than ever. On April 2, 2008, The Washington Post devoted a long column to her, just one of hundreds of articles and blog posts appearing around the world. On June 23, 2008, Cuba's daily newspaper, Granma, published a lengthy prologue, written by Fidel Castro, to the book Fidel, Bolivia y algo más, which had been re-issued fifteen years after its initial publication. In a prologue to this new edition of a book commemorating his visit to Bolivia in 1993, Fidel Castro took the opportunity to quote a long excerpt from Sánchez's blog and, although he did not mention her name, expressed his disappointment that there are young persons in Cuba today who think as she does. Castro describes Sánchez's statements as a generalization used as a slogan.

Sánchez responded to Castro's comments by saying in her blog that she would allow her husband, journalist Reinaldo Escobar, to respond to Castro's statements because she felt it best to leave the fighting at the "macho-man-male" level, and instead continue with her "womanly" labor of weaving together the "frayed tapestry" of their society. Sánchez's husband responded with:

The ex-president disapproves of the fact that Yoani accepted this year's Ortega y Gasset Prize for Digital Journalism, arguing that the prize is something that imperialism favours to blow its own horn. I recognize the right of this gentleman to make this comment, but I allow myself to observe that the responsibility implied in receiving a prize is never comparable to that of bestowing one, and Yoani, at least, has never awarded a medal to a corrupt person, a traitor, a dictator or a murderer.

Escobar went on to enumerate a list of names he says are "terrible and undeserving" recipients who were awarded the Order of José Marti by Castro, including names such as Leonid Brezhnev, Nicolae Ceaușescu, Gustáv Husák, and Robert Mugabe, among others.

=== Blogging blind ===
Since her blog was blocked from public Internet sites in Cuba, Sánchez has relied on Cuban friends abroad to post her texts for her, which she sends to them by email, along with the accompanying photographs. In a 2009 interview with Ted Henken published in Poder360, Sánchez commented on being a "blind blogger" by saying that the Cuban government "filtered" the DesdeCuba.com website from the Internet, including access from hotels in order to prevent Sánchez from updating her site. To combat this, Sánchez developed what she terms a "citizen network", consisting of people outside Cuba who help distribute her posts.

As of January 2009, Generation Y (all languages) was getting about 14 million 'hits' a month. On the Spanish language site, each entry receives hundreds, if not thousands, of comments.

=== 14ymedio ===
On May 21, 2014, Sánchez launched 14ymedio, the first independent digital media outlet in Cuba. Shortly after the launch, the website was blocked by the Cuban government but was later unblocked again.

== Books ==
In 2011, Sánchez published her first book, Havana Real: One Woman Fights to Tell the Truth About Cuba Today, four years' worth of her translated blog collected in book form, and which describes her views on everyday life in Cuba under the rule of both Fidel and Raúl Castro. She was not able to leave Cuba to promote her book, but smuggled flash drives out of Cuba containing videotaped book readings. She has written a second book, Word Press: A Blog for Speaking to the World. Sánchez has been described as a talented writer.

== Growing the Cuban blogosphere ==
Given the challenges of blogging in Cuba, the number of blogs on the DesdeCuba site grew quickly. Eight months after she started Generation Y, she was joined on the Desdecuba website by her husband Reinaldo Escobar's blog, Desde Aqui (From Here), in December 2007. In January three more Desdecuba blogs were launched: Sin EVAsion (Without Evasion); El Blog de Dimas (The Blog of Dimas); and Retazos (Fragments). In March 2008, Potro Salvaje (Wild Pony) was launched, joined by La Colmena (The Beehive) in May 2008.

When the Cuban government blocked access to Sánchez's blog from the island, it also blocked access to the DesdeCuba website, where these other blogs were housed. The other bloggers faced the same challenges Sánchez had in maintaining their blogs, and also needed to find ways around the censorship—either relying on friends with access inside Cuba from their government offices, using complex and time-consuming workarounds to find "back doors" into their blogs, or reaching out to friends and strangers abroad who volunteered to help, and who posted email blog entries they would never be able to see. With their blogs targeted to Cuban readers on the island, the discouragement was compounded by knowing that even if they could post, their readers could not read the posts. This limitation was circumvented by making copies of the blogs on CDs, either from computers on the island with access to the website, or sent from friends abroad. Although this method of disseminating the blogs was slow and delayed, and readers could not comment directly on the website, it was quite effective and continues to this day [March 2009]. Sanchéz said to a known Venezuelan blogger that visited her in Havana: "In any case we are trying to educate others so blogging would become in Cuba a permanent feature, a means of democratizing citizen expression, as in the free world."

On January 28, Sánchez launched Voces Cubanas. This citizen journalism project seeks to provide a multimedia platform to independent bloggers in Cuba to express the realities and hardships of everyday life there. During an interview published by Global Voices, Sánchez said this was a website "where all those who want to express ideas, put their projects online, can do so." An article in El Nuevo Herald by Ivette Leyva Martinez, speaks to the role played by Sánchez and other young people, outside the Cuban opposition and dissidence movements, in working towards a free and democratic Cuba today. On March 29, 2009, at a performance by Tania Bruguera, a podium with an open microphone was staged for those wishing to have one minute of uncensored, public speech. Sánchez was among speakers who publicly criticized censorship and said that "the time has come to jump over the wall of control". The Communist regime dismissed the event and Sánchez without using her name.

== Support and detention ==
=== Father José Conrado's letter to Raúl Castro ===
On February 5, 2009, Father José Conrado, Pastor of Santa Teresita del Niño Jesús in Santiago de Cuba, wrote an open letter to Cuban president Raúl Castro Ruz which was published in the digital magazine Contodos.

Sánchez and Escobar traveled to Santiago de Cuba the weekend before the letter was released and spent several days there, meeting with Father Conrado. During the same visit they held a blogger meeting with young people there, and Sánchez put her Ortega y Gasset award in the sanctuary of the Virgin of Charity of Cobre, where "the long arm of the censor does not enter". Excerpts from the letter were published on The Huffington Post.

=== Abduction ===
According to Sánchez, on Friday, November 6, 2009, she and three others were taken in her own neighborhood by men working for the Cuban government. She said that she was heading to an anti-violence demonstration and was forcefully put into a car along with another Cuban blogger, Orlando Luis Pardo Lazo (she stated that the other two were placed into another car). She characterizes the event on her blog, Generation Y, as a "kidnapping" and describes the event in detail. Sánchez said that when she was accosted on the street, "The curious crowded around and I shouted, 'Help, these men want to kidnap us', but they stopped those who wanted to intervene with a shout that revealed the whole ideological background of the operation, 'Don't mess with it, these are counterrevolutionaries.'" Sánchez said that she was put into the backseat of the car and received blows to her head, legs and buttocks as she was pinned down. The incident was condemned by the U.S. administration and by Human Rights Watch.

According to BBC reporter Fernando Ravsberg, who interviewed Sánchez on Monday, November 9, 2009, he did not see bruises, marks or scars on her body. When asked, she explained, "Throughout the weekend I had a swollen cheekbone and eyebrow. Above all I have a lot of pain in the lower back." She still had marks on her buttocks however, which she could not show to the reporter. She attributed that to the "skill of her captors". When CNN's David Ariosto reported on the incident, after Sánchez was injured but before she met with the BBC reporter, Sánchez is shown in video footage with bruising and swelling around her left eye and bruising on her arm. The video report appeared on CNN Espanol on Monday, November 9, 2009.

=== Questionnaire ===
In 2009, Sánchez mailed seven questions to United States President Barack Obama. On November 18, 2009, Obama supposedly responded to these questions with a detailed expression of his support for the bloggers' work:

Your blog provides the world a unique window into the realities of daily life in Cuba. It is telling that the Internet has provided you and other courageous Cuban bloggers with an outlet to express yourself so freely, and I applaud your collective efforts to empower fellow Cubans to express themselves through the use of technology. The government and people of the United States join all of you in looking forward to the day all Cubans can freely express themselves in public without fear and without reprisals.

The day after she received the unexpected answers from President Obama, Sánchez drafted seven questions for President Castro that she left with the council of state, supreme governing body for Cuba.

According to documents revealed by Wikileaks, it was not Obama who answered the questionnaire sent by the blogger in 2009, but the United States Interests Section in Havana.

=== 2012 arrest ===
Sánchez and her husband were arrested on October 4, 2012, apparently in an attempt to prevent her from writing about the trial of conservative politician Ángel Carromero, who crashed a rental car, killing Oswaldo Payá. She was released a day later.

=== 2026 arrest ===
On 5 November 2026, Sánchez was detained by State Security agents in Havana after she left her home to go shopping. Her arrest was condemned by Reporters Without Borders, who called on Cuban officials to immediately and unconditionally release her.

== 2013 trip ==
With a change in the passport laws in January 2013, Sánchez was granted a Cuban passport enabling her to travel abroad. She had previously applied for an exit permit 20 times without success. On February 17, 2013, Sánchez traveled to more than twelve countries in Europe and the Americas, including Brazil and the United States, where, in Miami, she criticized the inadequacy of Cuba's reforms as well as the United States embargo against Cuba. She returned to Cuba on May 30.

== Awards ==
In 2008, Sánchez was honored with awards that included Time magazine's "One of the 100 Most Influential People in the World", one of Foreign Policy magazine's "10 Most Influential Latin American Intellectuals" of the year, and the El País 2008 "Ortega y Gasset Prize for Digital Journalism". She was, as well, one of El País' 2008 100 most notable Hispanoamericans, and one of Gatopardo's 10 most influential people of 2008.

Time magazine named Sánchez's blog, "Generation Y", one of the "25 Best Blogs of 2009". The World Economic Forum, yearly, selects a group of young global leaders of whom Sánchez was one, in 2009. In the summer of 2009, Sánchez was honored as one of the winners of the Columbia University School of Journalism's "Maria Moors Cabot Prize". The prize is the oldest in international journalism. Sánchez was denied an exit permit by the Cuban government to travel to the New York City award dinner. In 2010, Sánchez was named a "World Press Freedom Hero" by the International Press Institute.

- 2008 – Ortega y Gasset Prize for Journalism
- 2008 – "100 Most Influential People in the World" – Time magazine
- 2008 – "100 most notable Hispanoamericans" – El País newspaper
- 2008 – "10 most influential people of 2008" – Gatopardo Magazine
- 2008 – "10 Most Influential Latin American Intellectuals" of the year – Foreign Policy magazine
- 2009 – "25 Best Blogs of 2009" – Time magazine
- 2009 – "Young Global Leader Honoree" – World Economic Forum
- 2009 – Maria Moors Cabot prize – Columbia University Prize
- 2010 – World Press Freedom Hero – International Press Institute
- 2011 – International Women of Courage Awards
- 2012 – "10 Most Influential Ibero American Intellectuals" of the year – Foreign Policy magazine
