= 14ymedio =

Cuban independent digital media outlet

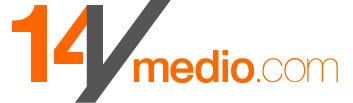
- Type: Daily newspaper
- Format: Digital
- Owner: CLYS Comunicaciones 3.0
- Founder: Yoani Sánchez
- Editor: Reinaldo Escobar
- Staff writers: 12
- Founded: May 2014; 11 years ago
- Language: Spanish, English
- Headquarters: Havana, Cuba
- Website: 14ymedio.com

14ymedio is an independent digital media outlet in Cuba. It was founded on May 21, 2014, by the Cuban blogger and activist Yoani Sánchez and the Cuban journalist Reinaldo Escobar. The project started with a group of 12 reporters. The newspaper wrote news about Cuba and the world on topics related to politics, economy, society, science and technology, and sports. It also publishes editorials, opinion articles, and interviews.

The number '14' in the name is because the newspaper was born "on the fourteenth floor, in the fourteenth year of the new millennium". The letter 'Y' has been a constant characteristic in other projects of Yoani Sánchez, its founder, who also founded "Generación Y", while 'medio' refers to the media and to the journalistic connotation of the project. The team uploads the publication by using Wi-Fi access from hotels.

== History ==
14ymedio starts as a personal project of its founder, Yoani Sánchez, the founder of 'Generación Y'. Its stated main objective is "to inform, to open space for debate, to respect those who think differently, and to harmonize free speech with civic responsibility". For its initial funding, the newspaper received approximately $150,000 in private investment.

The first edition of 14ymedio critiqued the Cuban healthcare system and questioned the status of baseball as the national sport. Its cover included the story "Red Dawn: Havana is killing out there", by Víctor Ariel González, in which violence in the capital city is discussed. It also included an opinion article about the economic reforms introduced under the leadership of Raúl Castro, written by the dissident blogger Miriam Celaya.

Three hours after 14ymedio published its first edition on the internet, the site was hacked. Those who tried to access the site were redirected to a webpage titled "Yoani$landia", which mentioned that Cubans are tired that Yoani Sánchez tries to portray herself as the 'Mother Teresa of Calcutta' of the Cuban dissidents. Some technicians tested it, and it was ETECSA, the communications monopoly of the Cuban government, that hacked the page. From places outside Cuba, users can access the site without any restriction. Yoani Sánchez later published in her Twitter account: "Wrong strategy from the Cuban government. There is nothing more attractive than the forbidden".

The actions of the Cuban government against 14ymedio have provoked various reactions in the international arena. The Inter American Press Association (IAPA) blamed the Cuban government for restricting access to the site and promoting censorship. They claimed that the government's actions show that Cuban rulers still believe that "freedom of expression is a grant and not a human right". Roberta Jacobson, the Assistant Secretary of State for Western Hemisphere Affairs, condemned the blockade on her Twitter account too.

14ymedio has not stopped publishing daily since the day of its release. By May 2014, 14ymedio had reached 6,000 followers on Facebook and 11,500 on Twitter.

== Content ==
Some of the articles that were published by 14ymedio were quoted in The New York Times, The Washington Post, and others. The members of the team insist that 14ymedio is not a blog or a newspaper from the opposition.

They define 14ymedio as a way to 'balance the flood of official information' by emphasizing the issues that the government does not want to inform. Victor Ariel González said that the newspaper was created with the idea that someday there would be a democracy in Cuba. Sánchez claimed that she chose online journalism over politics to express her criticism of the Cuban current system rather than participating in politics as a member of the opposition.

== Team ==
14ymedio's team is directed by Yoani Sánchez and operates from her apartment in Cuba. It is conformed by 12 reporters and collaborators. Some of the members of the team are Lilianne Ruiz; Luz Escobar, Reinaldo Escobar's daughter; and Víctor Ariel González, son of the dissident blogger Miriam Celaya.

By the end of 2014, several members of 14ymedio's team were arrested. Reinaldo Escobar, for example, was detained as he left his own apartment; he was handcuffed and taken to patrol number 628 in front of the building. Víctor Ariel González was also detained for a couple hours. During that day, Yoani Sánchez remained under house arrest.

== Recognition ==
14ymedio's work is now potentiated with the 'Yahoo! Fellowship' that Yoani Sánchez obtained from Georgetown University. 'Yahoo! Fellow' is a research scholarship that will allow Sánchez to share her experience of launching an online newspaper in a closed society.

14ymedio has also been recognized by a variety of international newspapers and media outlets. Al-Jazeera wrote that 14ymedio is "the first independent media outlet in Cuba in 50 years to test the Castro regime's tolerance for dissent". The BBC wrote that 14ymedio will "contribute with information so that Cubans can decide with more maturity their own destinies", while Vice News described the newspaper as "a new player in town in the homogenous media landscape of the communist island that is already testing the limits of the government's strict controls on the digital sphere".
