= Americans in Cuba =

Americans in Cuba Estadounidenses en Cuba
Regions with significant populations
- Havana

Languages
- American English · Cuban Spanish

Related ethnic groups
- American diaspora

Americans in Cuba (Spanish: Estadounidenses en Cuba) consist of expatriates, immigrants and fugitives from the United States, as well as Cubans of American descent. They are few in number due to the hostile history of Cuba–United States relations following communist Fidel Castro's takeover of the Cuban government in 1959. As of September 1998, there were about 2,000 to 3,000 Americans living in Cuba. One source places the figure at 125 in 2024. Much larger is the number of American visitors, who in 2014 accounted for the second largest group, after Canadians.

== Notable expatriates ==
Ernest Hemingway purchased Finca Vigía, a house near Havana, in 1940 and lived there with his wife for 20 years.

William Alexander Morgan was one of the few Americans who fought in the Cuban Revolution, rising to the rank of comandante, but later became disillusioned with Castro; he was eventually tried and executed by firing squad. Another American participant in the Revolution was Lorna Burdsall, an American dancer and choreographer who married Cuban revolutionary Manuel Piñeiro and helped procure arms and ammunition.

Many American fugitives have found refuge in Cuba. A 1998 House of Representatives resolution cites a figure of 77.

Many are or were members of radical leftist organizations, Puerto Rican separatist groups and Black nationalist organizations, most notably the Black Panther Party, who fled to the country to escape U.S. authorities in the 1960s and '70s. Assata Shakur, a member of the Black Panthers and later the Black Liberation Army and convicted murderer of a New Jersey state trooper in 1973, escaped from prison in 1979 and was granted political asylum in Cuba in 1984. Her accomplice, Nehanda Abiodun, was also granted asylum, as was Puerto Rican separatist William Morales. In 2011 FBI agent Luis Fraticelli stated that Víctor Manuel Gerena was living in Cuba after stealing $7,000,000 for the Puerto Rican separatist group Los Matcheteros. Civil rights activist Robert F. Williams and his wife fled the FBI, living in Cuba from 1961 and 1965, returning to the United States after all charges were eventually dropped.

It was also a popular destination for hijackers of American jetliners in the 1960s and early '70s. Luis Armando Peña Soltren was one of four hijackers of Pan Am Flight 281 on 24 November 1968; in 2009 he returned to the United States from Cuba and surrendered himself to the authorities. William Lee Brent, a Black Panther, hijacked Trans World Airlines Flight 154 on 17 June 1969 and landed in Cuba, where he lived until his death in 2006.

A more conventionally criminal fugitive was financier Robert Vesco.

In the 1980s, there was an organized group of African Americans who called themselves the Union of North American Residents. They consisted of around 30 expatriates, some members of the US Communist Party, others leftist writers or English teachers.

== Visitors ==
In 2009, President Barack Obama rescinded a limit of one family visit per every three years imposed on Cuban Americans by his predecessor, George W. Bush. In 2011, he reinstated "people-to-people" trips, allowing Americans "to participate in educational activities that promote contact with ordinary Cubans."

While it remains illegal for Americans to travel to Cuba as simply tourists, the United States Department of the Treasury's Office of Foreign Assets Control licenses travel to the country provided it falls into one of 12 categories:

family visits; official business of the U.S. government, foreign governments, and certain intergovernmental organizations; journalistic activity; professional research and professional meetings; educational activities; religious activities; public performances, clinics, workshops, athletic and other competitions, and exhibitions; support for the Cuban people; humanitarian projects; activities of private foundations or research or educational institutes; exportation, importation, or transmission of information or informational materials; and certain authorized export transactions.

In 2014, Americans were second (behind Canadians) as visitors, at 173,550 in just the first three months of the year. Among its attractions is Cuba's reputation for excellent and less expensive medical care, resulting in medical tourism. A small number of students also study at the Latin American School of Medicine in Havana.

== See also ==
- Cuban American
