= Free Cuba =

Free Cuba may refer to:

- Center for a Free Cuba
- Citizens Committee for a Free Cuba, a defunct anti-Castro organization in the United States
- Commission for Assistance to a Free Cuba
- Crusade to Free Cuba Committee
