= American fugitives in Cuba =

Political self-exiled US citizens in Cuba

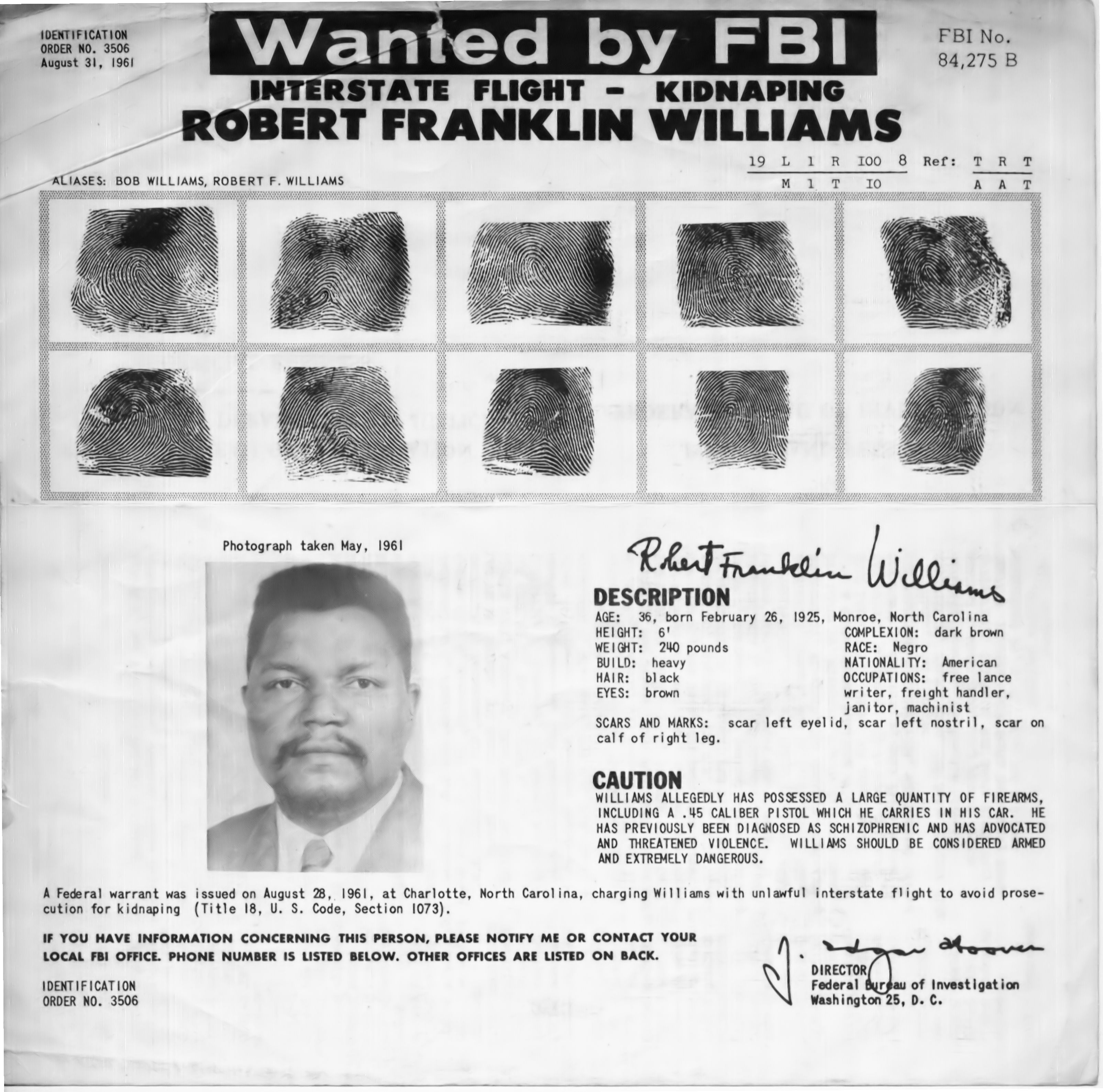
The FBI's wanted poster for Robert F. Williams, the first prominent American fugitive in Cuba, 1961

The United States and Cuba have maintained an extradition treaty since April 6, 1904, following the island's independence. Modern diplomatic relations are cold due to historic conflict and divergent political ideologies which has strained fulfillment of their bilateral extradition treaty. The active treaty has historically had weak enforcement mechanisms with both nations consistently noncompliant.

U.S. fugitives have sought political asylum in Cuba since the 1960s, stemming from a variety of domestic and international social movements. This includes the black power movement of the 1960s to 1980s, the Puerto Rican independence movement, and CIA-led foreign operations on the island. A 1998 estimate of U.S. fugitives in Cuba cites a figure of 77.

== History ==
=== 1960s – 1980s ===
Cuban leader Fidel Castro had long tried to court African American support for Cuba ever since the victory of the Cuban Revolution and the promotions of Cuba as an island without racism ideal for African American tourists. Robert F. Williams was invited to live in Cuba after legal prosecutions against him in the United States in 1961. He later suggested against black militants without criminal histories hijacking planes to come to Cuba. Williams was also discouraged from promoting Black nationalist beliefs by the Cuban government.

Between 1967 and 1968 dozens of Black Panthers found refuge in Cuba. Eldridge Cleaver went to reside Cuba in 1968 and asked for Cuba to train Black Panthers militarily, the proposition was declined. By 1969 various Black Panthers in Cuba complained of not being allowed to organize their party or discuss African culture, and arrests following protesting conditions in Cuba or asking to leave the country. No Black Panther Party members hijacked planes in 1967 or 1968. It wasn't until William Lee Brent, a Bay Area Black Panther, who on June 17, 1969, hijacked Trans World Airlines Flight 154 to Cuba. Hijackings committed by Black people in the US bound to Cuba between 1968 and May 1969 were exclusively escaped criminals or political activists but none of them were Black Panther Party members. It was only after William Lee Brent's hijacking that other Black Panthers would find political exile in Cuba. Most moved on to Algiers where Eldridge Cleaver, Minister of Information for the Black Panther Party, headed the International Section of the BPP. Many exiled Panthers and former hijackers now turned Panthers, made up Cleavers group. Most hijackers were interviewed by Cuban authorities and either sent to live in the "Hijackers House" dormitory or work in labor camps. Huey P. Newton found himself residing in Cuba in 1974 and mostly kept to himself in his home in Santa Clara. Assata Shakur would find refuge in Cuba later in 1984. By the time Shakur resided in Cuba the Cuban government had relaxed procedures used on fugitives residing in Cuba and mainly left her to her own devices.

=== Modern status ===
Since the U.S. and Cuba restored diplomatic relations in 2015, ending a 54-year stretch of hostility, extradition policy has become a key foreign policy issue. Since the late 2010s, relations have deteriorated in part to disagreements on fugitive extradition. In 2016, American magazine The New Yorker reported that despite prisoner exchanges, Cuba has not extradited suspected U.S. fugitives. In 2018, Cuba extradited a fugitive from New Jersey back to the U.S. after initially refusing extradition in 2014. The U.S. government proposed legislation in 2022 to force greater Cuban compliance with their existing extradition treaty. In 2025, the U.S. formally listed Cuba as uncooperative in fugitive extradition, some of which were wanted by American authorities on international terrorism charges.

== Fugitive list ==
The following people are fugitives who have or currently are finding refuge in Cuba (alphabetical order):

- Nehanda Abiodun
- Philip Agee
- Hugh Almeida, U.S. Army physician
- William Lee Brent
- Eldridge Cleaver
- Lorenzo Kom'boa Ervin
- Víctor Manuel Gerena
- Ishmael LaBeet, ringleader of the Fountain Valley massacre
- William Morales
- Huey P. Newton
- Assata Shakur
- Frank Terpil
- Robert Vesco
- Robert F. Williams

The U.S. Department of State officially claimed there were "at least 11 [American] fugitives" harbored by Cuba in 2025.

== See also ==
- Cuba-United States foreign relations
- United States embargo against Cuba
- List of people granted political asylum
