= Engage Cuba =

Engage Cuba is an American nonpartisan lobbying organization dedicated to the normalization of relations between the United States and Cuba. The organization is in favor of ending the travel and trade embargo of Cuba by the United States government.

== Purpose ==
Engage Cuba and the affiliated Engage Cuba Foundation (ECF) advocates for greater commercial and cultural exchange between Cuban and American tourists and businesses.
