= Center for a Free Cuba =

US-funded organization in Washington DC

- Formation: 1997; 29 years ago
- Headquarters: Falls Church, Virginia, United States
- Website: www.cubacenter.org

The Center for a Free Cuba is a Washington, DC–based organization. It states that it is "an independent, non-partisan institution dedicated to promoting human rights and a transition to democracy and the rule of law on the island. Established in November 1997, the center gathers and disseminates information about Cuba and Cubans to the media, non-governmental organizations, and the international community. The center also assists the people of Cuba through its information outreach and humanitarian programs on the island."

== Goal ==
The Center for a Free Cuba's was described by Scripps News as a "nonprofit group of Cuban exiles pushing for regime change on the island".

== Activities ==
=== Dissident activism ===
After it was reported by the United States Coast Guard that 227,000 Cubans fled Cuba for south Florida in 2022, John Suarez, the center's executive director, wrote an opinion piece for The Hill detailing the challenges that Cubans face in Cuba. He wrote about the experience of activist Chaviano González, a former math teacher that attempted to tally the number of people leaving the country and was arrested for doing so by the Cuban government, and highlighted the armed response that Cuban forces take against its own refugees. He also wrote that the Cuban government used home-grown vaccines during the COVID-19 pandemic and claimed that these caused many deaths. He claimed that the Cuban government has a monopoly on humanitarian resources, and refuses to distribute them to those in need. Suarez also wrote that after an artist, Diubis Laurencio Tejeda, was fatally shot by Cuban police, some of those that witnessed the crime were arrested and sentenced to 20 years in prison. Additionally, he discussed Cuba's new penal code in 2022 with expanded the death penalty to 23 new crimes, and increased punishments for civil disobedience.

During the 2024 Cuban protests, Janisset Rivero from the Center for a Free Cuba told ScrippsNews that the people of Cuba have no economic or political freedom and lacked transportation, electricity, and food.

=== Anti-détente efforts ===
Logan M. Williams, a student at the University of Connecticut and a researcher at the Center for a Free Cuba wrote that the Center opposes an American détente with the Cuban Communist Party and that a détente would "appeas[e] a brutal dictatorship" and embolden it to further repress the Cuban population, and strengthen its position to invite more of America's enemies to open bases on the island. Williams said Obama's attempted détente in 2009 was followed by the Cuban government murdering Oswaldo Payá in 2012, smuggling weapons to North Korea in 2013, and receiving smuggled weapons from China in 2015.

On July 2, 2019, the center's executive director, John Suarez, wrote an op-ed for The Gainesville Sun, calling Obama's attempted détente "disastrous" rejecting a report from The Miami Herald claiming that the Castro regime was an "economic life-line" for the Cuban people and claimed that the Cuban tourism aspect of its economy is totally controlled by the Cuban Military. The Herald specifically claimed that there was a growing private sector in Cuba, a claim that Suarez vehemently denied, claiming that the private sector individuals the herald reported on where cuentapropistas, or individuals licensed to engage in private economy activity, at the behest of the Cuban government, to only operate for themselves, and specifically to not form a company. Suarez compared Obama's efforts to open relations with Cuba to Jimmy Carter's efforts to do so in 1977 which were stopped when it was discovered that Cuba was hosting a Soviet brigade, as well as the Cuban government's response to the Mariel crisis. Suarez also wrote about Cuban support for the Sandinista guerillas, which he said turned El Salvador into a "bloodbath", Cuban support for drug smugglers in 1982 to destabilize the United States, massacres by dissidents in Cuba in 1993, the 1998 foiling of Cuban intelligence efforts to stage a terrorist act on American soil, and lastly, the two requests made by Castro for the Soviet Union to launch nuclear weapons at the United States on his behalf in the 1960s and 1980s.

Following the election of Joe Biden in 2020, Suarez said that "If the regime collapses on his watch, that could be a game-changer" and would bolster Biden's support in Florida.

In 2023 the center's president, Otto Reich, issued a statement quoted in a CBS article claiming that the Cuban government was "desperate" for food, fuel and other goods, and that it was increasingly depending on Russian support.

In 2024 Suarez co-wrote a report for The Heritage Foundation arguing in favor of Cuba remaining on the US list of state-sponsors of terrorism. Suarez highlighted Cuba's support, financing and arming of M-19 and ELN in Colombia, the 2017 chant from Cuban troops during a military parade calling for the shooting of former President Barack Obama, and Havana syndrome. Suarez also highlighted the Cuban government's support for Iran and their non-state proxies and concluded with denouncing efforts to détente as "bad policy."

=== Foreign base claim ===
In August 2023, Logan M. Williams, a student at the University of Connecticut and researcher at the Center for a Free Cuba, wrote that China was about to start construction of a military base on Cuba. The center also alleges that Hezbollah has a training center in Cuba citing a 2016 leaked email from Hillary Clinton. In 2023 Center President Otto Reich claimed that the Russian government had promised to open a Russian vehicle assembly plant and may revamp a spy station that it had previously phased out.

=== October 7th attack ===
In 2023 Center for a Free Cuba President Otto Reich wrote on the Jewish Policy Center website that the Cuban government had met with Iranian and Hamas officials shortly before the October 7th attack on Israel. Reich wrote that Iranian foreign minister Hossein Amirabdollahian met with Cuban president Miguel Diaz-Canel on February 5, Hamas leadership met with the Cuban ambassador to Lebanon Jorge León Cruz on February 25, and Iranian President Ebrahim Raisi met with Diaz-Canel on June 15. Reich argued that these meetings, coupled with Cuba's "long history of both antisemitism and support of extremist terrorist organizations in the Middle East" meant that the Cuban government had some element of culpability for the attack.

Shortly after the attack, John Suarez, the center's executive director, wrote an op-ed for The Hill, in which he said that Cuba was opposed to the state of Israel, starting with its support for the Palestine Liberation Organization (PLO) in 1965, to introducing the PLO to the Tricontinental Conference in Havana in 1966. He also wrote that Fidel Castro compared Israel to Nazi Germany in a 1979 address to the United Nations, and called Israeli actions against Palestinians in 2014 "a repugnant new form of fascism” and a "macabre genocide against the Palestinian people". He also wrote that 3,000 Cuban soldiers fought for the Arab states during the Yom Kippur War.

== Controversies ==
=== Embezzlement by Felipe Sixto ===
Felipe Sixto was working as Chief of Staff in the Center for a Free Cuba. In July 2007, Sixto left the center and joined the White House Office of Intergovernmental Affairs.

The center's Executive Director reported an alleged misuse of United States Agency for International Development grant money meant for the Center which then suspended financing of its Cuba programs while it investigated being overcharged $570,000 meant for use by the center to buy radios and flashlights.

On March 1, 2008, Sixto was selected from the Office of Intergovernmental Affairs and appointed by Republican President George W. Bush as a Special Assistant to the President for Intergovernmental Affairs, as well as becoming the deputy director of the Office of Public Liaison.

When he heard of the investigation Sixto resigned from his new position as Presidential Aide a few weeks later on March 20, 2008.

On December 19, 2008, Sixto pled guilty to embezzlement of government funds for his own use, both while he was at the center and while he was in service to the President.

On March 18, 2009, Sixto, was fined $10,000 and sentenced to 30 months in prison.

== Funding ==
The Center for a Free Cuba has received grants from the National Endowment for Democracy.

== See also ==
- Commission for Assistance to a Free Cuba
- Citizens Committee for a Free Cuba
