= Caleb McCarry =

American official (born 1961)

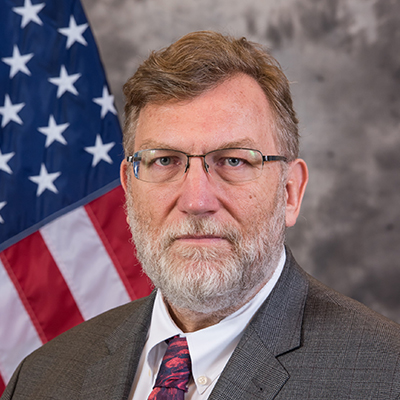
- McCarry in 2019
- Born: October 24, 1961 (age 64)
- Occupation: Cuba Transition Coordinator

Caleb Charles McCarry (born October 24, 1961) was the Bush administration's Cuba Transition Coordinator. The position developed out of the Commission for Assistance to a Free Cuba. McCarry described the Commission's purpose as to put forth "an intelligent, generous and above all respectful offer of support to the Cuban people" in efforts to end "the dictatorship [that] has willfully and cruelly divided the Cuban family." His mission was described by the Cuban government as "part of a broader U.S. 'plan for Cuba's annexation.'"

McCarry was previously a professional staff member and subcommittee staff director for Rep. Henry Hyde and Representative Benjamin A. Gilman who chaired the House International Relations Committee. He is the son of the novelist and former CIA agent Charles McCarry. He speaks Spanish and has a degree in Spanish literature from the University of Massachusetts Amherst.

== Biography ==
In 1990, McCarry was director of a Guatemalan project of the Center for Democracy, an organization designed to "promote the democratic process in the United States and abroad."

While a congressional staffer, McCarry was known for oversight of U.S. policy during the rule of Haitian President Jean-Bertrand Aristide. In 2004, McCarry participated in the Haiti Democracy Project, whose stated goal is to "Help Haiti Move Forward".

In 2013, McCarry joined the staff of the Senate Committee on Foreign Relations as an aide to Senator Bob Corker. In 2017, he was awarded the Commander's Cross of the Spanish Order of Isabel la Católica on behalf of King Felipe VI at the Spanish embassy in Washington, D.C. for his contributions to Spanish-American relations. In 2018, he helped to negotiate the release of American Joshua Holt from Venezuelan custody. After Corker's retirement, he became a counselor to Adam Boehler, the chief executive officer of the U.S. International Development Finance Corporation.

== Cuba Transition Coordinator ==
According to a BBC News Online article of April 11, 2006, "He says his job is to help Cubans "recover their freedom after 47 years of brutal dictatorship".

The creation of a "Cuba Transition Coordinator" post within the United States government was heavily criticized by Cuban government officials. Shortly after McCarry's appointment, Cuban Foreign Minister Felipe Perez Roque told the United Nations that the United States' plans to overthrow the Cuban government are "delusional".

Several prominent Cuban dissidents, including well-known anti-Castro activists Elizardo Sanchez and the late Oswaldo Payá, said McCarry's appointment was counterproductive, as "[i]t will allow the Cuban government to raise the spectre of foreign interference in the internal affairs of our country."

== See also ==
- Commission for Assistance to a Free Cuba
- Cuba–United States relations
