= Cuba–United States relations =

- Cuba: United States

Diplomatic mission
- Embassy of Cuba, Washington, D.C.: Embassy of the United States, Havana

Envoy
- Chargé d'affaires Lianys Torres Rivera: Chargé d'affaires Mike Hammer

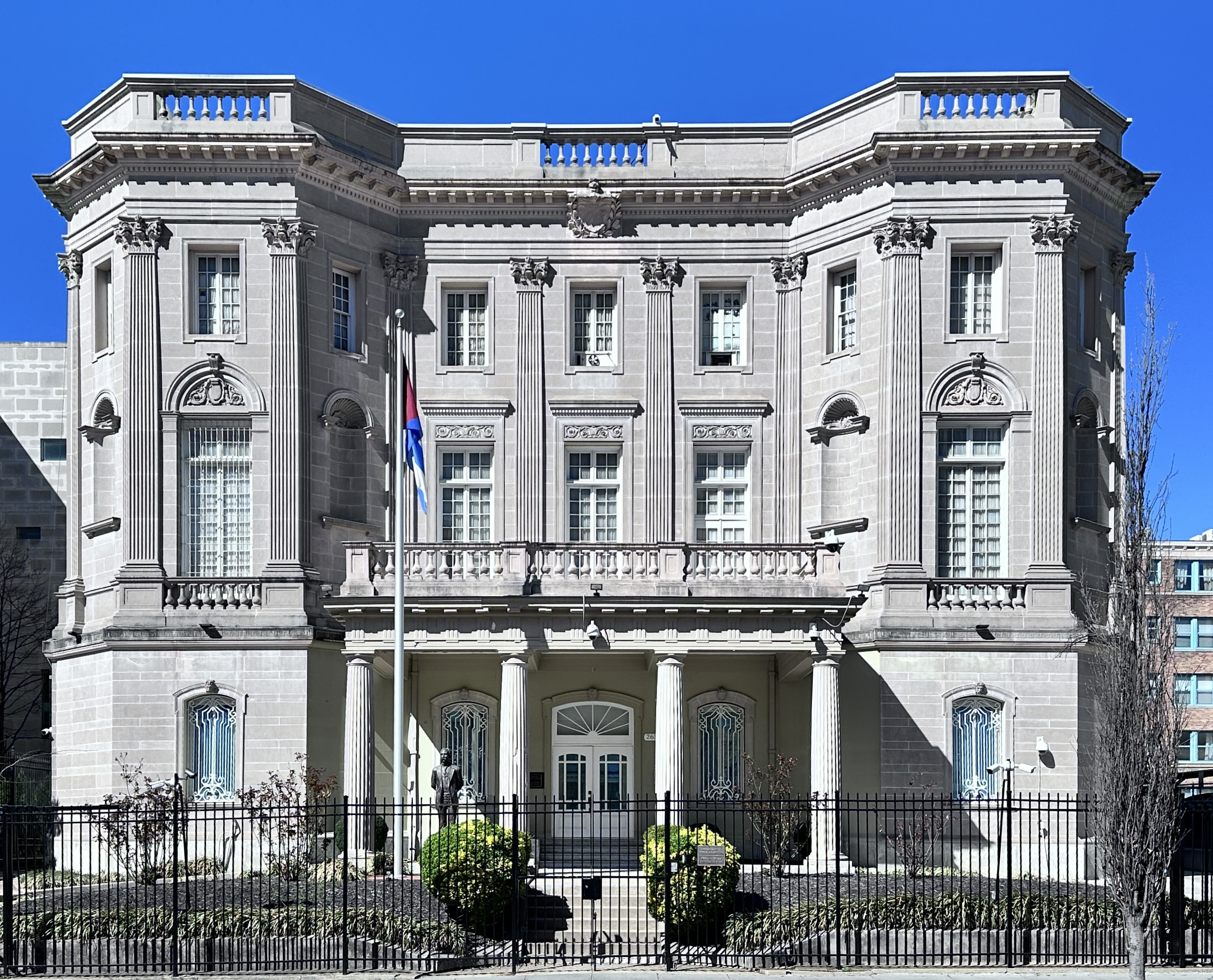
The Embassy of Cuba in Washington, D.C. in 2023

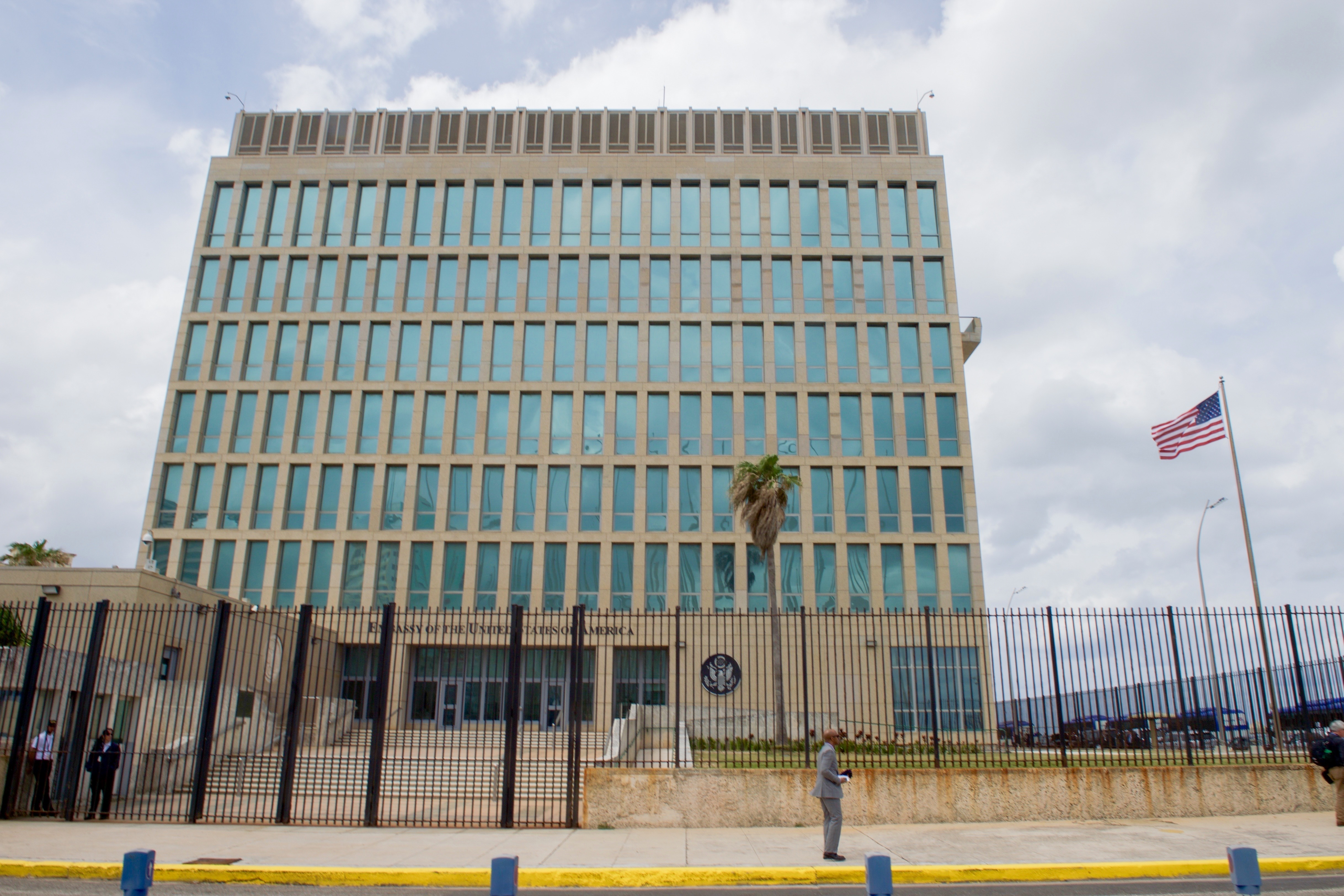
The Embassy of the United States in Havana in 2016

Modern diplomatic relations between Cuba and the United States are cold, stemming from historic conflict and divergent political ideologies. The two nations restored diplomatic relations on July 20, 2015, after relations had been severed in 1961 during the Cold War. The U.S. has maintained a comprehensive trade embargo against Cuba since 1960. The embargo includes restrictions on all commercial, economic, and financial activity, making it illegal for U.S. corporations to do business with Cuba.

Early 19th century relations centered mainly on extensive trade, before manifest destiny increasingly led to an American desire to buy, conquer, or control Cuba. The U.S. attempted to purchase Cuba in 1848 and in 1854 from Spain. It successfully took over Cuba in 1898 as a U.S. territory within the Treaty of Paris. The U.S. provided weapons, money, and its authority to the military dictatorship of Fulgencio Batista that ruled Cuba from 1952 to 1958. They deteriorated during the Cuban Revolution of 1959. The U.S. recruited operatives in Cuba to carry out a violent campaign of terrorism and sabotage on the island, killing civilians and causing economic damage.

The U.S. government terrorism campaign against Cuba was accelerated from early 1960. Later that year Cuba nationalized all U.S-owned on-shore oil refineries, seizing approximately $1.7 billion in U.S. oil assets. In 1961, the U.S. severed diplomatic ties with Cuba and attempted to invade the country; following its failure the U.S. engaged in a violent campaign of terrorist attacks to overthrow the Cuban government, killing a significant number of civilians. A year later, during the Cuban Missile Crisis, Cuba permitted the Soviet Union to deploy nuclear missiles on the island, which led the U.S. government to blockade the island.

Relations briefly normalized from 2015 to 2017, under U.S. President Barack Obama and First Secretary of the Communist Party Raúl Castro, in an effort known as the Cuban thaw. Relations have since materially deteriorated due to stark differences on immigration, counterterrorism, civil and political rights, human rights, electoral interference, disinformation campaigns, humanitarian aid, trade policy, financial claims, fugitive extradition and Cuban foreign policy. The U.S. has designated Cuba a state sponsor of terrorism two times: from 1982 to 2015 and from 2021 onward.

== History ==
=== 18th century ===
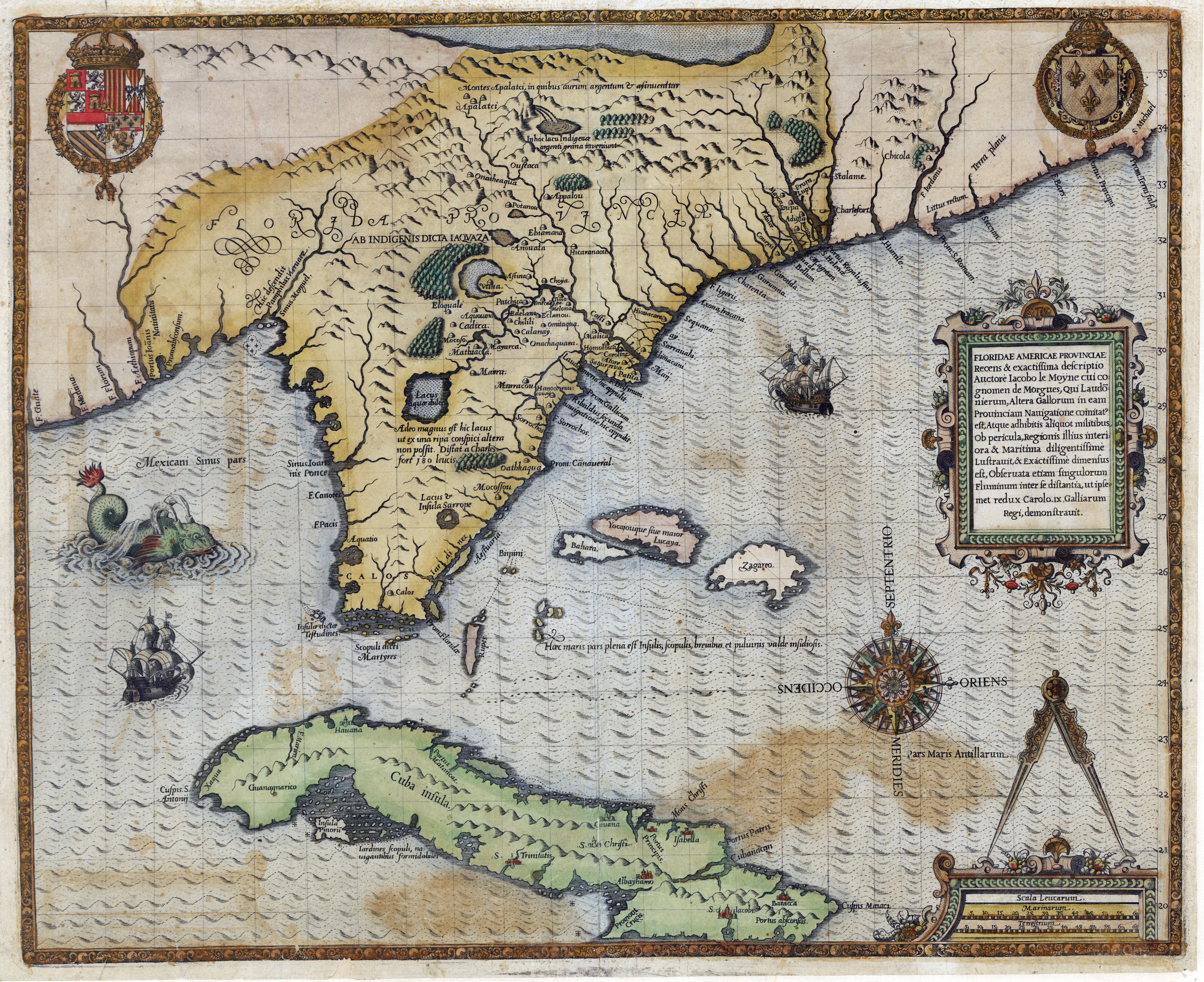
A 1591 map of Florida and Cuba

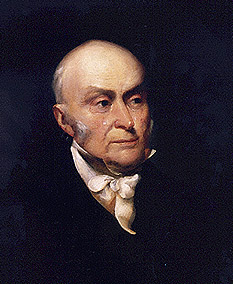
John Quincy Adams, who as U.S. Secretary of State compared Cuba to an apple that, if severed from Spain, would gravitate towards the U.S.

Relations between the Spanish colony of Cuba and polities on the North American mainland first established themselves in the early 18th century through illicit commercial contracts by the European colonies of the New World, trading to elude colonial taxes. As both legal and illegal trade increased, Cuba became a comparatively prosperous trading partner in the region, and a center of tobacco and sugar production. During this period Cuban merchants increasingly traveled to North American ports, establishing trade contracts that endured for many years.

The British capture and temporary occupation of Havana in 1762, which many Americans participated in, opened up trade with the colonies in North and South America, and the American Revolution in 1776 provided additional trade opportunities. Spain opened Cuban ports to North American commerce officially in November 1776 and the island became increasingly dependent on that trade.

=== 19th century ===
After the opening of the island to world trade in 1818, trade agreements began to replace Spanish commercial connections. In 1820 Thomas Jefferson thought Cuba is "the most interesting addition which could ever be made to our system of States" and told Secretary of War John C. Calhoun that the United States "ought, at the first possible opportunity, to take Cuba." In a letter to the U.S. Minister to Spain Hugh Nelson, Secretary of State John Quincy Adams described the likelihood of U.S. "annexation of Cuba" within half a century despite obstacles: "But there are laws of political as well as of physical gravitation; and if an apple severed by the tempest from its native tree cannot choose but fall to the ground, Cuba, forcibly disjoined from its own unnatural connection with Spain, and incapable of self support, can gravitate only towards the North American Union, which by the same law of nature cannot cast her off from its bosom."

The desire to procure Cuba intensified in the 1840s, not only in the context of manifest destiny but also in the interest of Southern power. Cuba, with some half a million slaves, would provide Southerners with extra leverage in Congress. In the late 1840s, President James K. Polk dispatched his minister to Spain Romulus Mitchell Saunders with a mission to offer $100 million to buy Cuba. Saunders however did not speak Spanish, and as then Secretary of State James Buchanan noted "even [English] he sometimes murders". Saunders was a clumsy negotiator, which both entertained and angered the Spanish. Spain replied that they would "prefer seeing [Cuba] sunk in the ocean" than sold. It may have been a moot point anyway, as it is unlikely that the Whig majority House would have accepted such an obviously pro-Southern move. The 1848 election of Zachary Taylor, a Whig, ended formal attempts to purchase the island.

In August 1851, 40 Americans who took part in Narciso López's filibustering Lopez Expedition in Cuba, including the Attorney General's nephew William L. Crittenden, were executed by Spanish authorities in Havana. News of the executions caused a furor in the South, spawning riots in which the Spanish consulate in New Orleans was burned to the ground. In 1854, a secret proposal known as the Ostend Manifesto was devised by U.S. diplomats, interested in adding a slave state to the Union. The Manifesto proposed buying Cuba from Spain for $130 million. If Spain were to reject the offer, the Manifesto implied that, in the name of Manifest Destiny, war would be necessary. When the plans became public, because of one author's vocal enthusiasm for the plan, the manifesto caused a scandal, and was rejected, in part because of objections from anti-slavery campaigners.

The Cuban rebellion of 1868 to 1878 against Spanish rule, called by historians the Ten Years' War, gained wide sympathy in the United States. Juntas based in New York raised money and smuggled men and munitions to Cuba while energetically spreading propaganda in American newspapers. The Grant administration turned a blind eye to this violation of American neutrality. In 1869, President Ulysses S. Grant was urged by popular opinion to support rebels in Cuba with military assistance and to give them U.S. diplomatic recognition. Secretary of State Hamilton Fish wanted stability and favored the Spanish government and did not publicly challenge the popular anti-Spanish American viewpoint. Grant and Fish gave lip service to Cuban independence, called for an end to slavery in Cuba, and quietly opposed American military intervention. Fish worked diligently against popular pressure, and was able to keep Grant from officially recognizing Cuban independence because it would have endangered negotiations with Britain over the Alabama Claims. Daniel Sickles, the American Minister to Madrid, made no headway. Grant and Fish successfully resisted popular pressures. Grant's message to Congress urged strict neutrality and no official recognition of the Cuban revolt.

By 1877, Americans purchased 83 percent of Cuba's total exports. North Americans were also increasingly taking up residence on the island, and some districts on the northern shore were said to have more the character of America than Spanish settlements. Between 1878 and 1898 American investors took advantage of deteriorating economic conditions of the Ten Years' War to take over estates they had tried unsuccessfully to buy before while others acquired properties at very low prices. Above all this presence facilitated the integration of the Cuban economy into the North American system and weakened Cuba's ties with Spain.

==== 1890s: Independence in Cuba ====
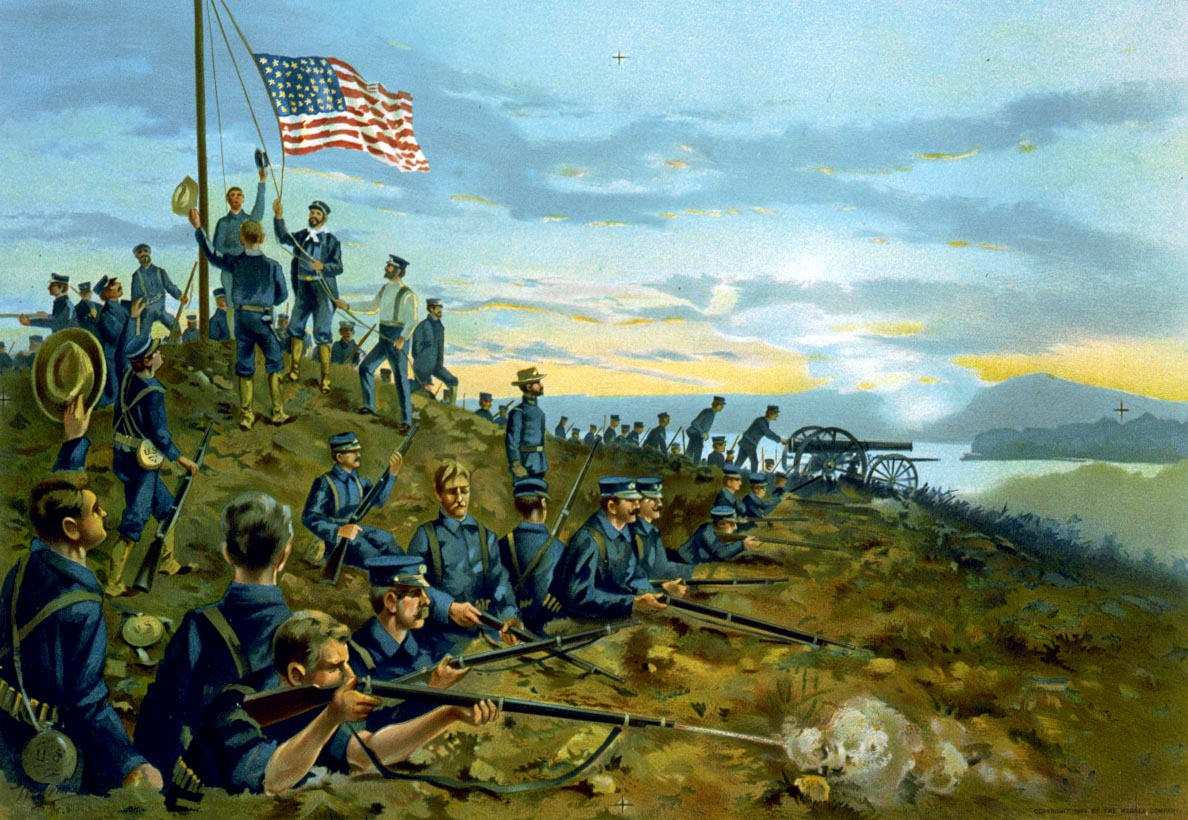
First hoisting of the United States Flag by the U.S. Marines on Cuban soil, June 11, 1898

As Cuban resistance to Spanish rule grew, rebels fighting for independence attempted to get support from U.S. President Ulysses S. Grant. Grant declined and the resistance was curtailed, though American interests in the region continued. U.S. Secretary of State James G. Blaine wrote in 1881 of Cuba, "that rich island, the key to the Gulf of Mexico, and the field for our most extended trade in the Western Hemisphere, is, though in the hands of Spain, a part of the American commercial system ... If ever ceasing to be Spanish, Cuba must necessarily become American and not fall under any other European domination."

After some rebel successes in Cuba's second war of independence in 1897, U.S. President William McKinley offered to buy Cuba for $300 million. Rejection of the offer, and an explosion that sank the American battleship USS Maine in Havana harbor, led to the Spanish–American War. In Cuba the war became known as "the U.S. intervention in Cuba's War of Independence". On 10 December 1898 Spain and the United States signed the Treaty of Paris and, in accordance with the treaty, Spain renounced all rights to Cuba. The treaty put an end to the Spanish Empire in the Americas and marked the beginning of United States expansion and long-term political dominance in the region. Immediately after the signing of the treaty, the U.S.-owned "Island of Cuba Real Estate Company" opened for business to sell Cuban land to Americans.

=== 20th century ===
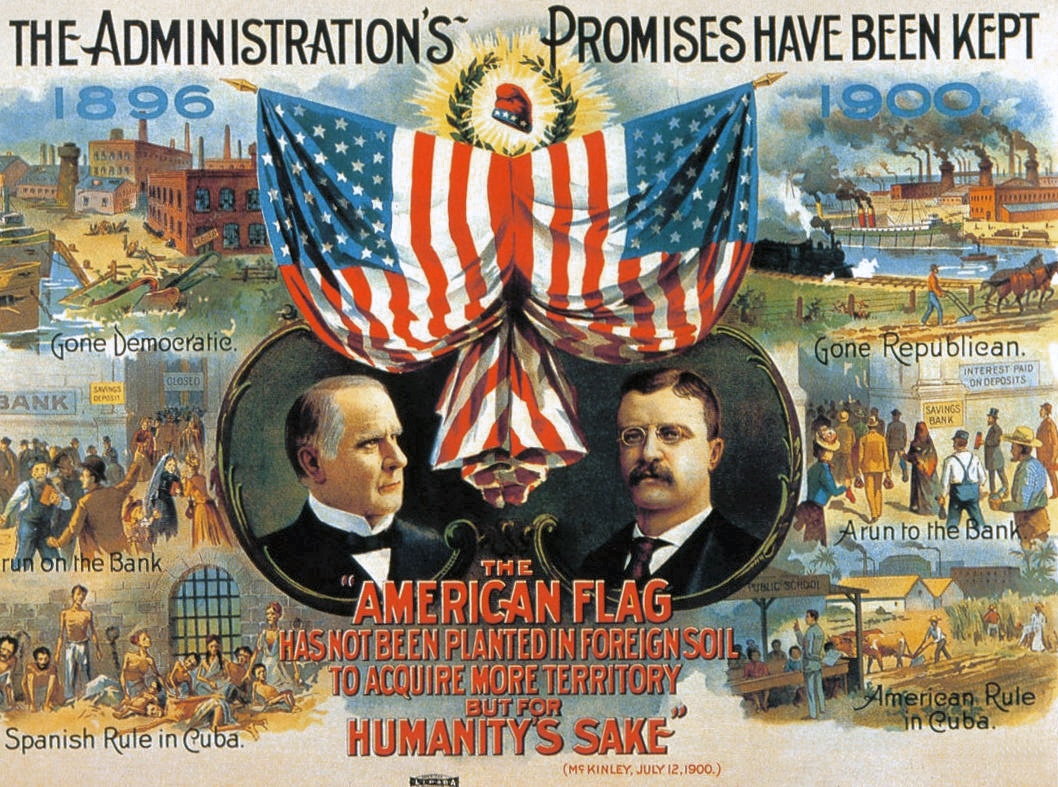
1900 Campaign poster for the Republican Party depicting American rule in Cuba

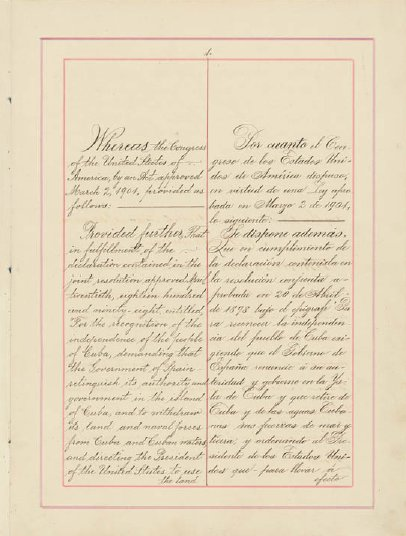
Opening page of the Platt Amendment (1902)

U.S. military rule of the island lasted until 1902 when Cuba was formally granted formal independence. The Teller Amendment to the U.S. declaration of war against Spain in 1898 disavowed any intention of exercising "sovereignty, jurisdiction or control" over Cuba, but the United States only agreed to withdraw its troops from Cuba when Cuba agreed to the eight provisions of the Platt Amendment, an amendment to the 1901 Army Appropriations Act authored by Connecticut Republican Senator Orville H. Platt, which would allow the United States to intervene in Cuban affairs if needed for the maintenance of good government and committed Cuba to lease to the U.S. land for naval bases. Cuba leased to the United States the southern portion of Guantánamo Bay, where a United States Naval Station had been established in 1898. The Platt Amendment defined the terms of Cuban-U.S. relations for the following 33 years and provided the legal basis for various U.S. military interventions.

Despite recognizing Cuba's transition into an independent republic, United States Governor Charles Edward Magoon assumed temporary military rule for three more years following a rebellion led in part by José Miguel Gómez. In the following 20 years the United States repeatedly intervened militarily in Cuban affairs: 1906–09, 1912 and 1917–22. In 1912 U.S. forces were sent to quell protests by Afro-Cubans against discrimination. At first President Woodrow Wilson (1913-1921) and Secretary of State William Jennings Bryan were determined to stay out of Cuban affairs. The political turmoil continued. Cuba joined in the war against Germany, and prospered from American contracts. US Marines were stationed to protect the major sugar plantations in the Sugar Intervention. However, in 1919 political chaos again threatened the Civil War and Secretary of State Robert Lansing sent General Enoch Crowder to stabilize the situation.

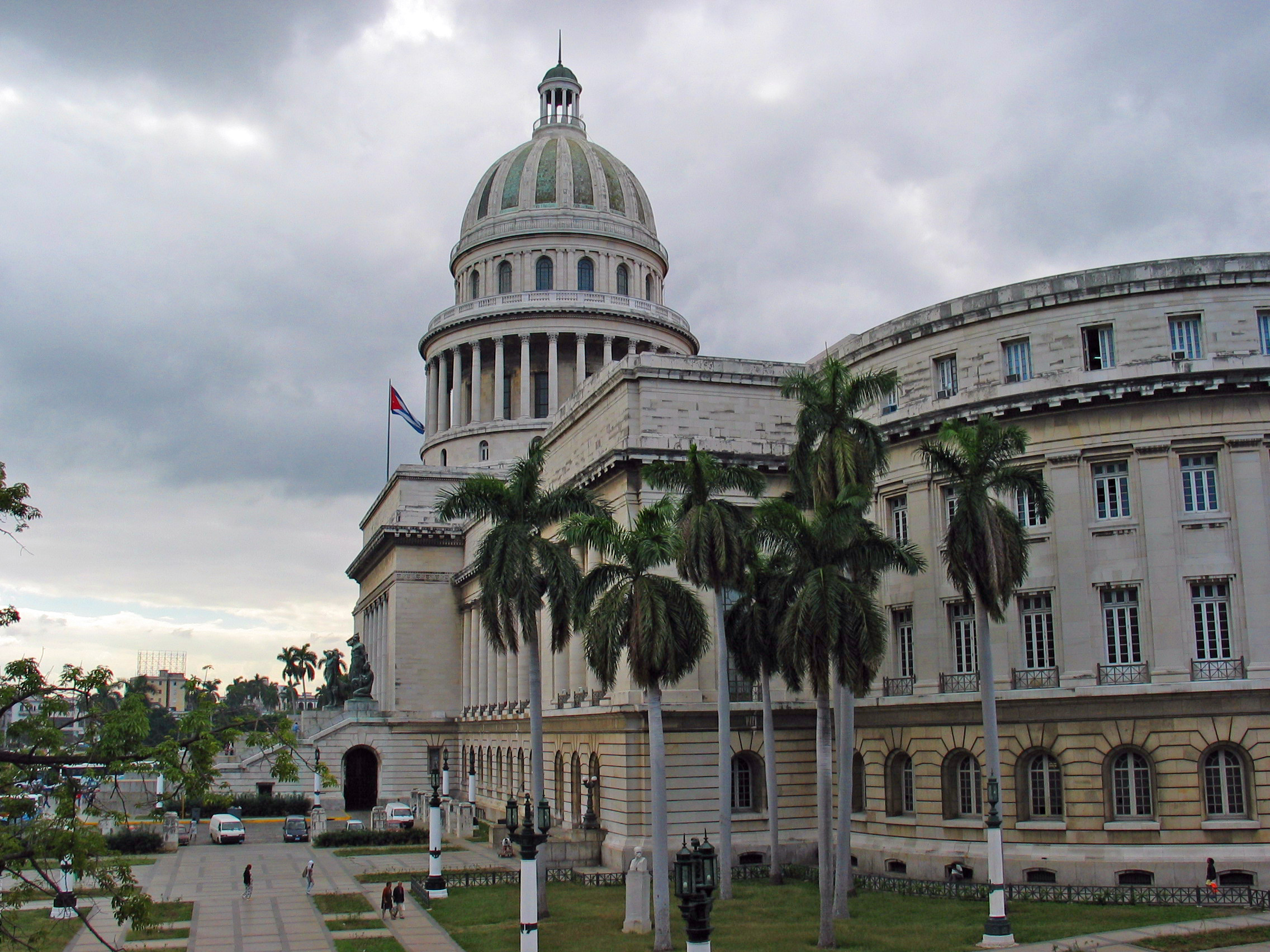
The Capitolio Nacional in Havana was built in 1929 and is said to be modeled on the Capitol building in Washington, D.C.

By 1926 U.S. companies owned 60% of the Cuban sugar industry and imported 95% of the total Cuban crop, and Washington was generally supportive of successive Cuban governments. President Calvin Coolidge led the U.S. delegation to the Sixth International Conference of American States from January 15–17, 1928, in Havana, the only international trip Coolidge made during his presidency; it would be the last time a sitting American president visited Cuba until Barack Obama did so on March 20, 2016. However, internal confrontations between the government of Gerardo Machado and political opposition led to his military overthrow by Cuban rebels in 1933. U.S. Ambassador Sumner Welles requested U.S. military intervention. President Franklin D. Roosevelt, despite his promotion of the Good Neighbor policy toward Latin America, ordered 29 warships to Cuba and Key West, alerting United States Marines, and bombers for use if necessary. Machado's replacement, Ramón Grau assumed the Presidency and immediately nullified the Platt amendment. In protest, the United States denied recognition to Grau's government, Ambassador Welles describing the new regime as "communistic" and "irresponsible".

The rise of General Fulgencio Batista in the 1930s to de facto leader and President of Cuba for two terms (1940–44 and 1952–59) led to an era of close co-operation between the governments of Cuba and the United States. The United States and Cuba signed another Treaty of Relations in 1934. Batista's second term as president was initiated by a military coup planned in Florida, and U.S. President Harry S. Truman quickly recognized Batista's return to rule providing military and economic aid. The Batista era witnessed the almost complete domination of Cuba's economy by the United States, as the number of American corporations continued to swell, though corruption was rife and Havana also became a popular sanctuary for American organized crime figures, notably hosting the infamous Havana Conference in 1946. U.S. Ambassador to Cuba Arthur Gardner later described the relationship between the U.S. and Batista during his second term as President:

Batista had always leaned toward the United States. I don't think we ever had a better friend. It was regrettable, like all South Americans, that he was known—although I had no absolute knowledge of it—to be getting a cut, I think is the word for it, in almost all the things that were done. But, on the other hand, he was doing an amazing job.

In July 1953, an armed conflict broke out in Cuba between rebels led by Fidel Castro and the Batista government. During the course of the conflict, the U.S. sold 8.238 million dollars' worth of weapons to the Cuban government to help quash the rebellion. However, the U.S. was urged to end arms sales to Batista by Cuban president-in-waiting Manuel Urrutia Lleó. Washington made the critical move in March 1958 to end sales of rifles to Batista's forces, thus changing the course of the Cuban Revolution irreversibly towards the rebels. The move was vehemently opposed by U.S. ambassador Earl E. T. Smith, and led U.S. State Department adviser William Wieland to lament that "I know Batista is considered by many as a son of a bitch ... but American interests come first ... at least he was our son of a bitch."

==== Post-revolution relations ====
Until Castro, the U.S. was so overwhelmingly influential in Cuba that the American ambassador was the second most important man, sometimes even more important than the Cuban president.

— Earl E. T. Smith, former American Ambassador to Cuba, during 1960 testimony to the U.S. Senate

U.S. President Dwight D. Eisenhower officially recognized the new Cuban government after the 1959 Cuban Revolution which had overthrown the Batista government, but relations between the two governments deteriorated rapidly. Within days Earl E. T. Smith, U.S. Ambassador to Cuba, was replaced by Philip Bonsal. The U.S. government became increasingly concerned by Cuba's agrarian reforms and the nationalization of industries owned by U.S. citizens. Between 15 and 26 April 1959, Fidel Castro and a delegation of representatives visited the U.S. as guests of the Press Club. This visit was perceived by many as a charm offensive on the part of Castro and his recently initiated government, and his visit included laying a wreath at the Lincoln memorial. After a meeting between Castro and Vice President Richard Nixon, where Castro outlined his reform plans for Cuba, the U.S. began to impose gradual trade restrictions on the island. On 4 September 1959, Ambassador Bonsal met with Cuban Premier Fidel Castro to express "serious concern at the treatment being given to American private interests in Cuba both agriculture and utilities."

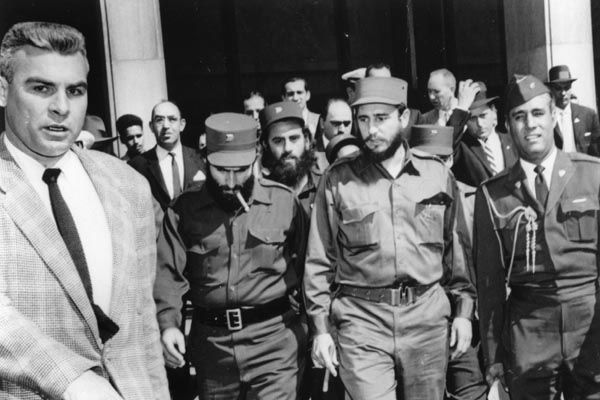
Fidel Castro during a visit to Washington, D.C., shortly after the Cuban Revolution in 1959

The Escambray rebellion was a six-year rebellion (1959–1965) in the Escambray Mountains by a group of insurgents who opposed the Cuban government led by Fidel Castro. The rebelling group of insurgents was a mix of former Batista soldiers, local farmers, and former allied guerrillas who had fought alongside Castro against Batista during the Cuban Revolution. As state intervention and take-over of privately owned businesses continued, trade restrictions on Cuba increased. The U.S. stopped buying Cuban sugar and refused to supply its former trading partner with much needed oil, with a devastating effect on the island's economy, leading to Cuba turning to their newfound trading partner, the Soviet Union, for petroleum. In March 1960, tensions increased when the French freighter La Coubre exploded in Havana Harbor, killing over 75 people. Fidel Castro blamed the United States and compared the incident to the sinking of the Maine, though admitting he could provide no evidence for his accusation. That same month, President Eisenhower quietly authorized the Central Intelligence Agency (CIA) to organize, train, and equip Cuban refugees as a guerrilla force to overthrow Castro.

US investors' holdings in Cuba equated to around $900 million in 1959 (equivalent to $7.6 billion in 2025), and accounted for close to 40 percent of the sugar production. Each time the Cuban government nationalized property belonging to American citizens, the American government took countermeasures, resulting in the prohibition of all exports to Cuba on 19 October 1960. Consequently, Cuba began to consolidate trade relations with the USSR, leading the U.S. to break off all remaining official diplomatic relations. Later that year, U.S. diplomats Edwin L. Sweet and William G. Friedman were arrested and expelled from the island having been charged with "encouraging terrorist acts, granting asylum, financing subversive publications and smuggling weapons". On 3 January 1961 the U.S. withdrew diplomatic recognition of the Cuban government and closed the embassy in Havana.

Presidential candidate John F. Kennedy believed that Eisenhower's policy toward Cuba had been mistaken. He criticized what he saw as use of U.S. government influence to advance the interest and increase the profits of private U.S. companies instead of helping Cuba to achieve economic progress, saying that Americans dominated the island's economy and had given support to one of the bloodiest and most repressive dictatorships in the history of Latin America. "We let Batista put the U.S. on the side of tyranny, and we did nothing to convince the people of Cuba and Latin America that we wanted to be on the side of freedom".

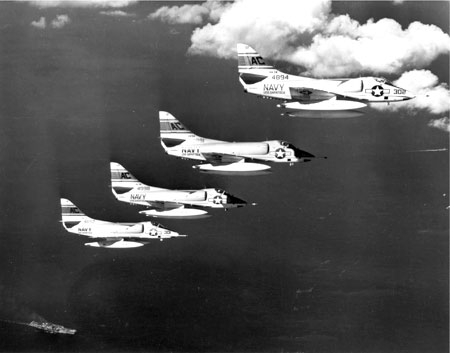
Douglas A-4 Skyhawks from the USS Essex flying sorties over combat areas during the Bay of Pigs Invasion in 1961

In April 1961, an armed invasion by about 1,500 CIA trained Cuban exiles at the Bay of Pigs was defeated by the Cuban armed forces. During this time, the US sent seven ships to sail, two of which were owned by the United Fruit Company. Castro was not thrilled with the United Fruit Company or this plan as his father worked as a laborer. President Kennedy's complete assumption of responsibility for the venture, which provoked a popular reaction against the invasion, proved to be a further propaganda boost for the Cuban government. The U.S. began the formulation of new plans aimed at destabilizing the Cuban government. The U.S. government engaged in an extensive series of terrorist attacks in Cuba. These activities were collectively known as the "Cuban Project" or Operation Mongoose. The attacks formed a CIA-coordinated program of terrorist bombings, political and military sabotage, and psychological operations, as well as assassination attempts on key political leaders. The Joint Chiefs of Staff also proposed attacks on mainland U.S. targets, hijackings and assaults on Cuban refugee boats to generate U.S. public support for military action against the Cuban government, these proposals were known collectively as Operation Northwoods.

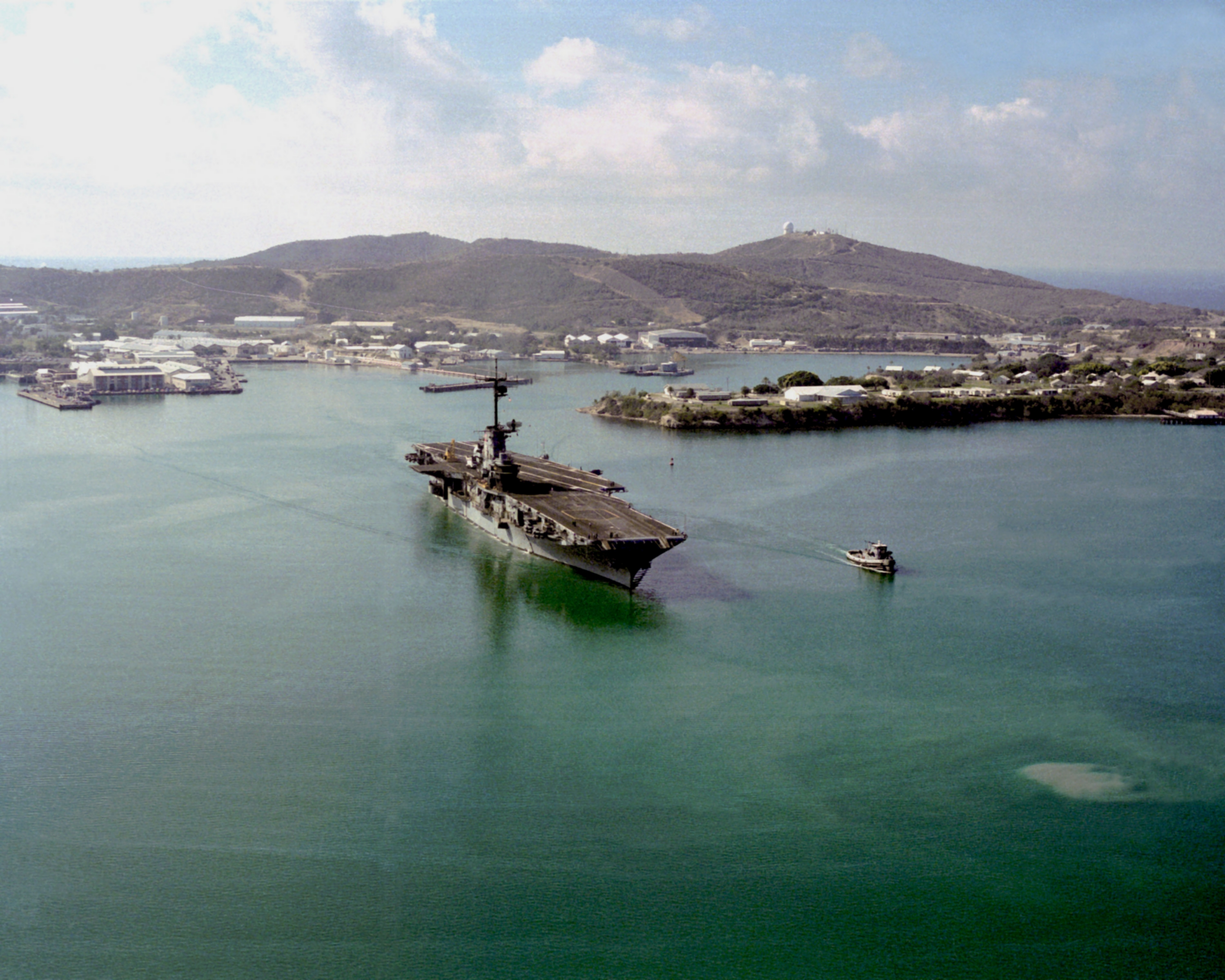
Since 1959, Cuba has regarded the U.S. presence in Guantánamo Bay as illegal

A U.S. Senate Select Intelligence Committee report later confirmed over eight attempted plots to kill Castro between 1960 and 1965, as well as additional plans against other Cuban leaders. After weathering the failed Bay of Pigs invasion, Cuba observed as U.S. armed forces staged a mock invasion of a Caribbean island in 1962 named Operation Ortsac. The purpose of the invasion was to overthrow a leader whose name, Ortsac, was Castro spelled backwards. Tensions between the two nations reached their peak in 1962, after U.S. reconnaissance aircraft photographed the Soviet construction of intermediate-range missile sites. The discovery led to the Cuban Missile Crisis.

Trade relations also deteriorated in equal measure. In 1962, President Kennedy broadened the partial trade restrictions imposed after the revolution by Eisenhower to a ban on all trade with Cuba, except for non-subsidized sale of foods and medicines. A year later travel and financial transactions by U.S. citizens with Cuba was prohibited. The United States embargo against Cuba was to continue in varying forms. Despite tensions between the United States and Cuba during the Kennedy years, relations began to thaw somewhat after the Cuban Missile Crisis. Back channels that had already been established at the height of tensions between the two nations began to expand in 1963. Though Attorney General Robert Kennedy worried that such contact would hurt his brother's chances of re-election, President John Kennedy continued these contacts resulting in several meetings U.S. ambassador William Atwood and Cuban officials such as Carlos Lechuga. Other contacts would be established directly between President Kennedy and Fidel Castro through media figures such as Lisa Howard and French reporter Jean Daniel days before the Kennedy Assassination with Castro stating "I am willing to declare Goldwater my friend if that will guarantee Kennedy's re-election".

Castro would continue efforts to improve relations with the incoming Johnson administration sending a message to Johnson encouraging dialogue saying:

I seriously hope that Cuba and the United States can eventually respect and negotiate our differences. I believe that there are no areas of contention between us that cannot be discussed and settled within a climate of mutual understanding. But first, of course, it is necessary to discuss our differences. I now believe that this hostility between Cuba and the United States is both unnatural and unnecessary – and it can be eliminated.

Continued tensions over various issues would hamper further efforts to normalization relations that started at the end of the Kennedy administration such as the Guantanamo dispute of 1964, or Cuba's embrace of American political dissidents such as Black Panther leaders who took refuge in Cuba during the 1960s. Perhaps the biggest clash during the Johnson administration would be the capture of Che Guevara in 1967 by Bolivia forces assisted by the CIA and U.S. Special forces.

Through the late 1960s and early 1970s a sustained period of aircraft hijackings between Cuba and the U.S. by citizens of both nations led to a need for cooperation. By 1974, U.S. elected officials had begun to visit the island. Three years later, during the Carter administration, the U.S. and Cuba simultaneously opened interests sections in each other's capitals.

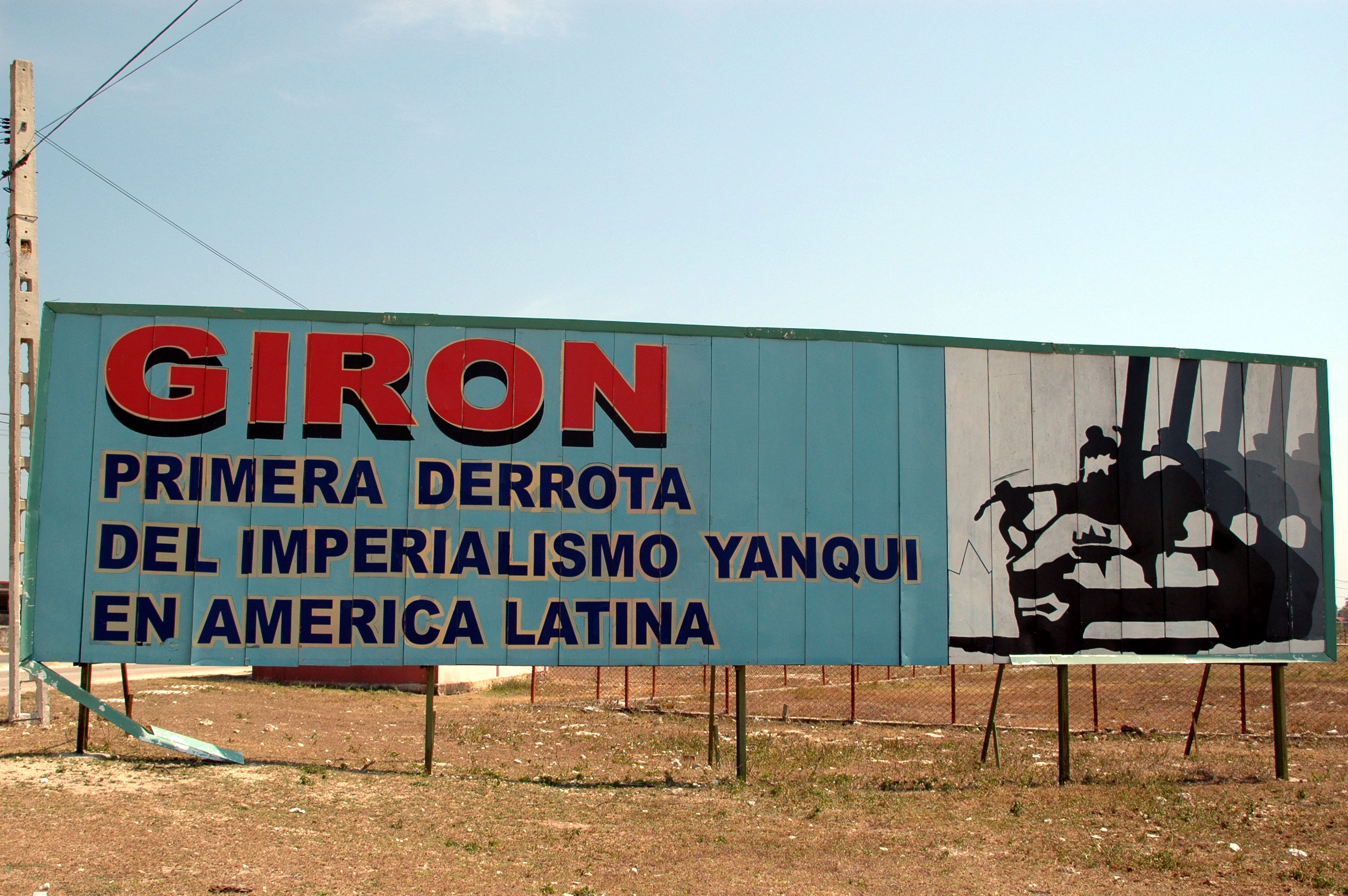
Poster in the Bay of Pigs extolling Cuba's victory in the eponymous invasion. The translation reads "Girón, the first defeat of Yankee imperialism in Latin America."

From late 1975 to 1976, the United States and Cuba were on opposite sides of the Angolan Civil War. Cuba and the Soviet Union supported the communist People's Movement for the Liberation of Angola (MPLA). The Cuban government sent combat troops to support the MPLA (see Cuban intervention in Angola). In reaction to the Cuban and Soviet support for MPLA, the CIA provided cash and weapons to the anti-communist National Union for the Total Independence of Angola (UNITA) (see CIA activities in Angola).

In 1977, Cuba and the United States signed a maritime boundary treaty, agreeing on the location of their border in the Straits of Florida. The treaty was never sent to the United States Senate for ratification, but the agreement has been implemented by the U.S. State Department. In 1980, after 10,000 Cubans crammed into the Peruvian embassy seeking political asylum, Castro stated that any who wished to do so could leave Cuba, in what became known as the Mariel boatlift. Approximately 125,000 people left Cuba for the United States.

Beginning in the 1970s a growing and coordinated effort by US-based Cuban dissident groups organized to confront the Castro regime through international bodies such as the United Nations. The United Nations Human Rights Council in particular would become a major front in these confrontations as issues of human rights became more widely known, especially in the 1980s as the United States itself became more directly involved during the Reagan administration, which had a tougher anti-Castro stance. In 1981 the Reagan administration announced a tightening of the embargo. The U.S. also re-established the travel ban, prohibiting U.S. citizens from spending money in Cuba. The ban was later supplemented to include Cuban government officials or their representatives visiting the U.S.

A significant turning point in the international United Nations efforts came in 1984 when the Miami-based Center for Human Rights led by Jesús Permuy successfully lobbied to have Cuba's diplomatic representative, Luis Sola Vila, removed from a key subcommittee of the UN Human Rights Council and replaced with a representative from Ireland, a Christian-Democratic ally in opposition of the Castro government. The following year Radio y Televisión Martí, backed by the Reagan administration, began to broadcast news and information from the U.S. to Cuba. In 1987 when US President Ronald Reagan appointed Armando Valladares, former Cuban political prisoner of 22 years, as the US ambassador to the United Nations Human Rights Committee.

Since 1990, the United States has presented various resolutions to the annual UN Human Rights Commission criticizing Cuba's human rights record. The proposals and subsequent diplomatic disagreements have been described as a "nearly annual ritual". Long-term consensus between Latin American nations has not emerged. By the end of the Cold War in 1992, there had been a substantial change in Geneva as the United Nations Human Rights Committee representatives had shifted from initial rejection, then indifference and towards embrace of the anti-Castro Cuban human rights movement's diplomatic efforts.

==== After the Cold War ====
The Cold War ended with the dissolution of the Soviet Union in the early 1990s, leaving Cuba without its major international sponsor. The ensuing years were marked by economic difficulty in Cuba, a time known as the Special Period. U.S. law allowed private humanitarian aid to Cuba for part of this time. However, the long-standing U.S. embargo was reinforced in October 1992 by the Cuban Democracy Act (the "Torricelli Law") and in 1996 by the Cuban Liberty and Democracy Solidarity Act (known as the Helms-Burton Act). The 1992 act prohibited foreign-based subsidiaries of U.S. companies from trading with Cuba, travel to Cuba by U.S. citizens, and family remittances to Cuba. Sanctions could also be applied to non-U.S. companies trading with Cuba. As a result, multinational companies had to choose between Cuba and the U.S., the latter being a much larger market.

On 24 February 1996, two unarmed Cessna 337s flown by the group "Brothers to the Rescue" were shot down by Cuban Air Force MiG-29, killing three Cuban-Americans and one Cuban U.S. resident. The Cuban government claimed that the planes had entered into Cuban airspace.

Some veterans of CIA's 1961 Bay of Pigs invasion, while no longer being sponsored by the CIA, are still active, though they are now in their seventies or older. Members of Alpha 66, an anti-Castro paramilitary organization, continue to practice their AK-47 skills in a camp in South Florida.

=== 21st century ===
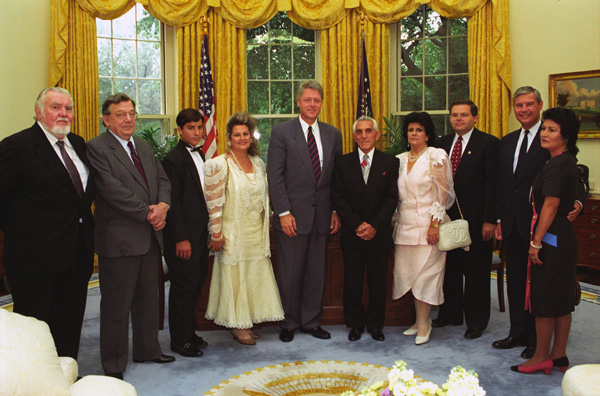
U.S. President Bill Clinton with Cuban political prisoner Mario Chanes, 1993

In January 1999, U.S. President Bill Clinton eased travel restrictions to Cuba in an effort to increase cultural exchanges between the two nations. The Clinton administration approved a two-game exhibition series between the Baltimore Orioles and the Cuba national baseball team, marking the end of the hiatus since 1959 that a Major League Baseball team played in Cuba.

At the United Nations Millennium Summit in September 2000, Castro and Clinton spoke briefly at a group photo session and shook hands. U.N. Secretary-General Kofi Annan commented afterwards, "For a U.S. president and a Cuban president to shake hands for the first time in over 40 years—I think it is a major symbolic achievement". While Castro said it was a gesture of "dignity and courtesy", the White House denied the encounter was of any significance. In November 2001, U.S. companies began selling food to the country for the first time since Washington imposed the trade embargo after the revolution. In 2002, former U.S. President Jimmy Carter became the first former or sitting U.S. president to visit Cuba since 1928.

On May 21st, 2002, a U.S. senate hearing before the Subcommittee on Consumer Affairs, Foreign Commerce, and Tourism of the Committee on Commerce, Science, and Transportation aimed at opening up food sales with Cuba. In attendance at the hearing was Lissa Weinmann, the Executive Director of the Americans for Humanitarian Trade with Cuba. In a statement to the Senate, Weinmann explained that the organization is "a national group of prominent Americans who advocate normal trade of food and medical products between the United States and Cuba." Weinmann noted that polls of the American people reflected overwhelming support for free trade of food and medicine products. Furthermore, the U.S. administration deeming Cuba to be a "terrorist state" damaged trade relations and created unnecessary obstacles for both individuals traveling between the two countries and small businesses aiming to trade across the border. She stated that despite some sales occurring within large companies, "for small to medium-sized buyers, the arcane regulations that govern such trade make it an impractical situation for them." Weinmann argues that trade between the U.S. and Cuba is mutually beneficial.

Americans for Humanitarian Trade with Cuba was established in January 1998 and included Cuban-Americans, farmers, physicians, and elected officials. Its most prominent members included David Rockefeller, Milton Friedman, Carla Hills, Frank Carlucci, John Whitehead, Paul Volcker, Julius Richmond, Craig L. Fuller, Sam Gibbons, James Rodney Schlesinger, among others.

Tightening embargo

Relations deteriorated again following the election of George W. Bush. During his campaign Bush appealed for the support of Cuban-Americans by emphasizing his opposition to the government of Fidel Castro and supporting tighter embargo restrictions. Cuban Americans, who until 2008 tended to vote Republican, expected effective policies and greater participation in the formation of policies regarding Cuba-U.S. relations. Approximately three months after his inauguration, the Bush administration began expanding travel restrictions. The United States Department of the Treasury issued greater efforts to deter American citizens from illegally traveling to the island. Also in 2001, five Cuban agents were convicted on 26 counts of espionage, conspiracy to commit murder, and other illegal activities in the United States. On 15 June 2009, the U.S. Supreme Court denied review of their case. Tensions heightened as the Under Secretary of State for Arms Control and International Security Affairs, John R. Bolton, accused Cuba of maintaining a biological weapons program. Many in the United States, including ex-president Carter, expressed doubts about the claim. Later, Bolton was criticized for pressuring subordinates who questioned the quality of the intelligence John Bolton had used as the basis for his assertion. Bolton identified the Castro government as part of America's "axis of evil", highlighting the fact that the Cuban leader visited several U.S. foes, including Libya, Iran and Syria.

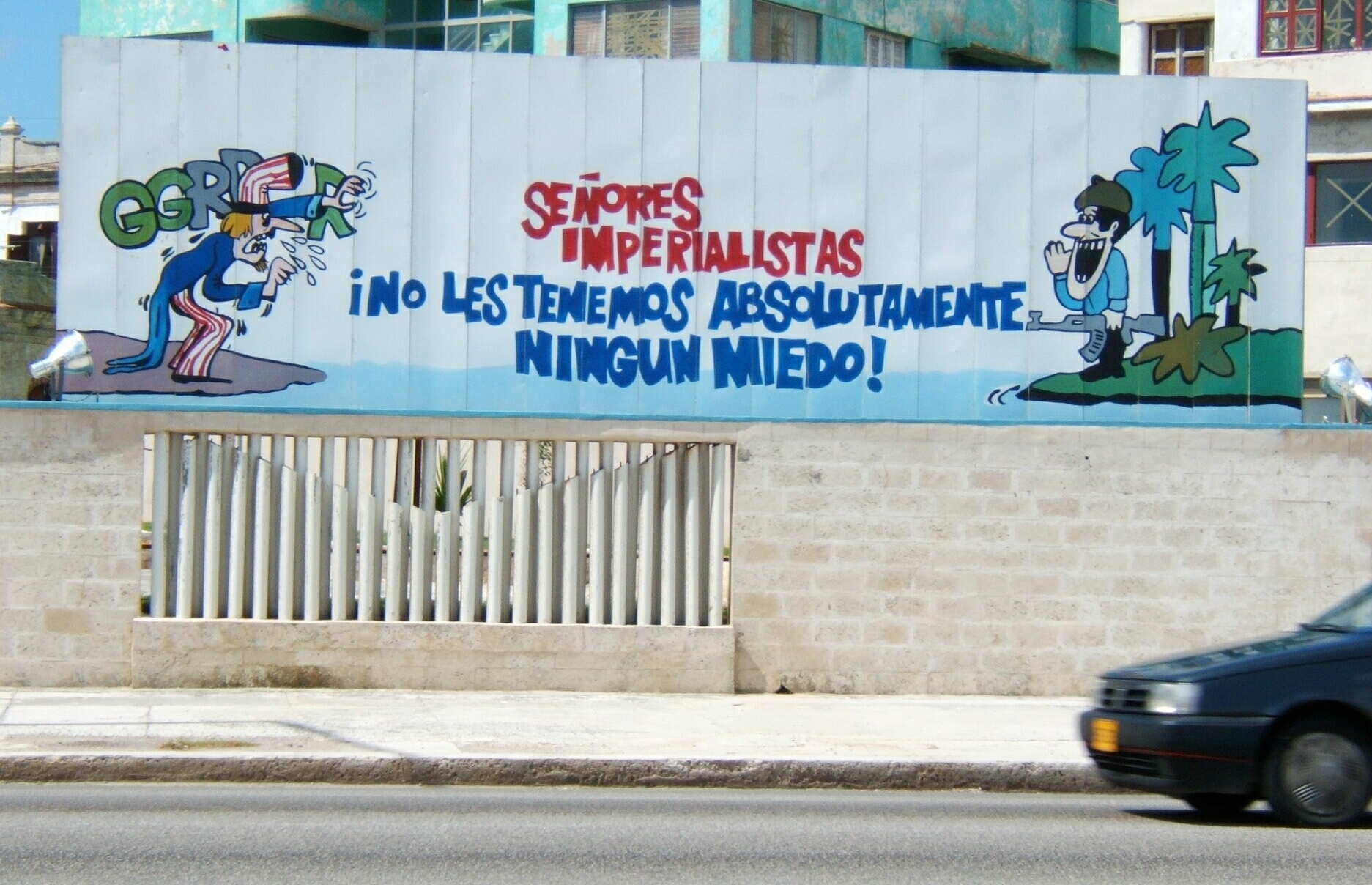
"Imperialists, we are not afraid of you at all!" Cuban propaganda poster in Havana featuring a Cuban soldier addressing a threatening Uncle Sam.

Following his 2004 reelection, Bush declared Cuba to be one of the few "outposts of tyranny" remaining in the world. In January 2006, United States Interests Section in Havana began, in an attempt to break Cuba's "information blockade", displaying messages, including quotes from the Universal Declaration of Human Rights, on a scrolling "electronic billboard" in the windows of their top floor. Following a protest march organized by the Cuban government, the government erected a large number of poles, carrying black flags with single white stars, obscuring the messages. On 10 October 2006, the United States announced the creation of a task force made up of officials from several U.S. agencies to pursue more aggressively American violators of the U.S. trade embargo against Cuba, with penalties as severe as 10 years of prison and hundreds of thousands of dollars in fines for violators of the embargo. In November 2006, U.S. Congressional auditors accused the development agency USAID of failing properly to administer its program for promoting democracy in Cuba. They said USAID had channeled tens of millions of dollars through exile groups in Miami, which were sometimes wasteful or kept questionable accounts. The report said the organizations had sent items such as chocolate and cashmere jerseys to Cuba. Their report concluded that 30% of the exile groups who received USAID grants showed questionable expenditures. After Fidel Castro's announcement of resignation in 2008, U.S. Deputy Secretary of State John Negroponte said that the United States would maintain its embargo.

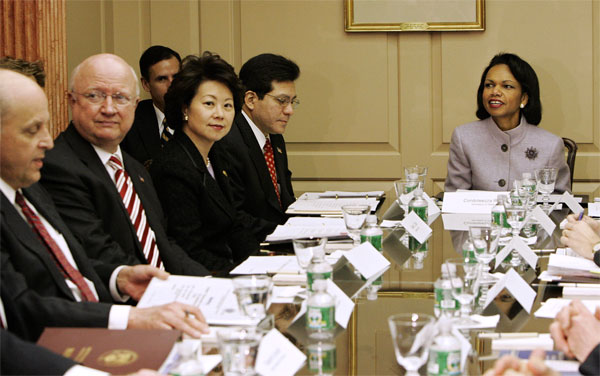
Condoleezza Rice convenes a meeting of the Commission for Assistance to a Free Cuba in December 2005

In 2003, the United States Commission for Assistance to a Free Cuba was formed to "explore ways the U.S. can help hasten and ease a democratic transition in Cuba." The commission immediately announced a series of measures that included a tightening of the travel embargo to the island, a crackdown on illegal cash transfers, and a more robust information campaign aimed at Cuba. Castro insisted that, in spite of the formation of the commission, Cuba is itself "in transition: to socialism [and] to communism" and that it was "ridiculous for the U.S. to threaten Cuba now". In a 2004 meeting with members of the Commission for Assistance to a Free Cuba, President Bush stated, "We're not waiting for the day of Cuban freedom; we are working for the day of freedom in Cuba." The President reaffirmed his commitment to Cuban-Americans just in time for his 2004 re-election with promises to "work" rather than wait for freedom in Cuba.

In April 2006, the Bush administration appointed Caleb McCarry "transition coordinator" for Cuba, providing a budget of $59 million, with the task of promoting the governmental shift to democracy after Castro's death. Official Cuban news service Granma alleges that these transition plans were created at the behest of Cuban exile groups in Miami, and that McCarry was responsible for engineering the overthrow of the Aristide government in Haiti. In 2006, the Commission for Assistance to a Free Cuba released a 93-page report. The report included a plan that suggested the United States spend $80 million to ensure that Cuba's communist system did not outlive the death of Fidel Castro. The plan also featured a classified annex that Cuban officials mistakenly claimed could be a plot to assassinate Fidel Castro or a United States military invasion of Cuba. Fidel Castro stepped down from his leadership of the Cuban state in 2006 but officially from 2008 and Barack Obama became the president of the United States in 2009.

In April 2009, Obama, who had received nearly half of the Cuban Americans vote in the 2008 presidential election, began implementing a less strict policy towards Cuba. Obama stated that he was open to dialogue with Cuba, but that he would only lift the trade embargo if Cuba underwent political change. In March 2009, Obama signed into law a congressional spending bill which eased some economic sanctions on Cuba and eased travel restrictions on Cuban-Americans (defined as persons with a relative "who is no more than three generations removed from that person") traveling to Cuba. The April executive decision further removed time limits on Cuban-American travel to the island. Another restriction loosened in April 2009 was in the realm of telecommunications, which would allow quicker and easier access to the internet for Cuba. The loosening of restrictions was considered likely to help nonprofits and scientists from both countries who work together on issues of mutual concern, such as destruction of shared biodiversity and diseases that affect both populations. At the 2009 5th Summit of the Americas, President Obama signaled the opening of a new beginning with Cuba.

Obama's overtures were reciprocated, to some degree, by new Cuban leader Raúl Castro. On 27 July 2012, Raúl Castro said that the Government of Cuba is willing to hold talks with the United States government to "discuss anything". On 10 December 2013, at a state memorial service for Nelson Mandela, Barack Obama and Raúl Castro shook hands, with Castro saying in English: "Mr. President, I am Castro." Though both sides played down the handshake, an adviser to Obama said that Obama wanted to improve relations with Cuba, yet had concerns about human rights on the island.

==== Cuban thaw ====
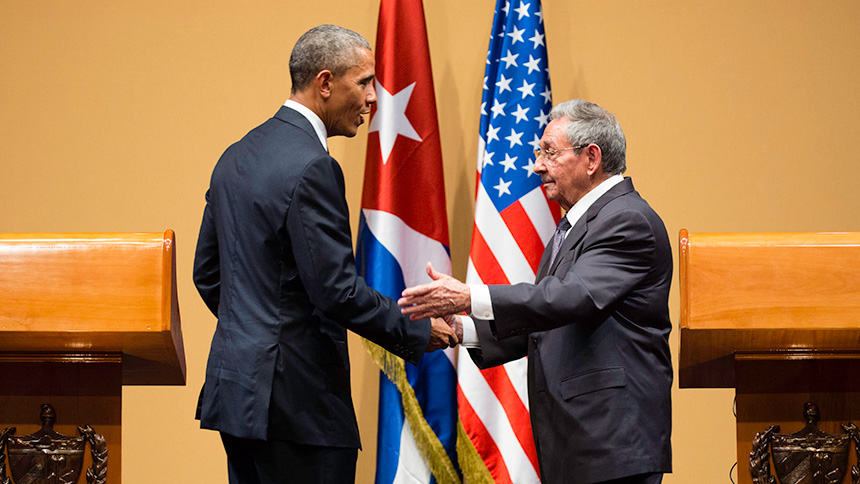
U.S. President Barack Obama and Cuban leader Raul Castro, in Havana, March 2016.

The Cuban thaw from the freezer was a brief normalization of Cuba–United States relations from July 2015 to June 2017, ending a 54-year stretch of hostility between the nations. Since 2013, Cuban and U.S. officials held secret talks brokered in part by Pope Francis and hosted in Canada and Vatican City to start the process of restoring diplomatic relations between Cuba and the United States. On 17 December 2014, the framework of an agreement to normalize relations and eventually end the longstanding embargo was announced by Castro in Cuba and Obama in the United States. Cuba and the United States pledged to start official negotiations with the aim of reopening their respective embassies in Havana and Washington.

As part of the agreement, aid worker Alan Gross and Rolando Sarraff Trujillo, a Cuban national working as a U.S. intelligence officer, were released by the Cuban government, which also promised to free an unspecified number of Cuban nationals from a list of political prisoners earlier submitted by the United States. For its part, the U.S. government released the last three remaining members of the Cuban Five. Reaction to this change in policy within the Cuban-American community was mixed, and Cuban-American senators Bob Menendez (D-NJ), Marco Rubio (R-FL), and Ted Cruz (R-TX) all condemned the Obama administration's change in policy. Opinion polls indicated the thaw in relations was broadly popular with the American public.

High-level diplomats from Cuba and the United States met in Havana in January 2015. While the talks did not produce a significant breakthrough, both sides described them as "productive", and Cuban Foreign Ministry official Josefina Vidal said further talks would be scheduled. Under new rules implemented by the Obama administration, restrictions on travel by Americans to Cuba were significantly relaxed as of 16 January 2015, and the limited import of items like Cuban cigars and rum to the U.S. was allowed, as was the export of American computer and telecommunications technology to Cuba.

On 14 April 2015, the Obama administration announced that Cuba would be removed from the U.S. "State Sponsors of Terrorism" list. The House and Senate had 45 days from 14 April 2015 to review and possibly block this action, but this did not occur, and on 29 May 2015, the 45 days lapsed, therefore officially removing Cuba from the United States' list of state sponsors of terrorism. On 1 July 2015, President Barack Obama announced that formal diplomatic relations between Cuba and the United States would resume, and embassies would be opened in Washington and Havana.

Relations between Cuba and the United States were formally re-established on 20 July 2015, with the opening of the Cuban embassy in Washington and the U.S. embassy in Havana. The agreement led to the lifting of some U.S. travel restrictions, fewer restrictions on remittances, access to the Cuban financial system for U.S. banks, and the establishment of a U.S. embassy in Havana. In 2016, Obama visited Cuba, becoming the first sitting U.S. president in 88 years to visit the island. Barack Obama visited Cuba for three days in March 2016. In August 2016, JetBlue Flight 387 landed in Santa Clara, becoming the first direct commercial flight to travel between the two countries since the early 1960s. On 28 November 2016, the first normally scheduled commercial flight after more than 50 years landed in Havana from Miami on an American Airlines jet.

==== Renewed embargo ====
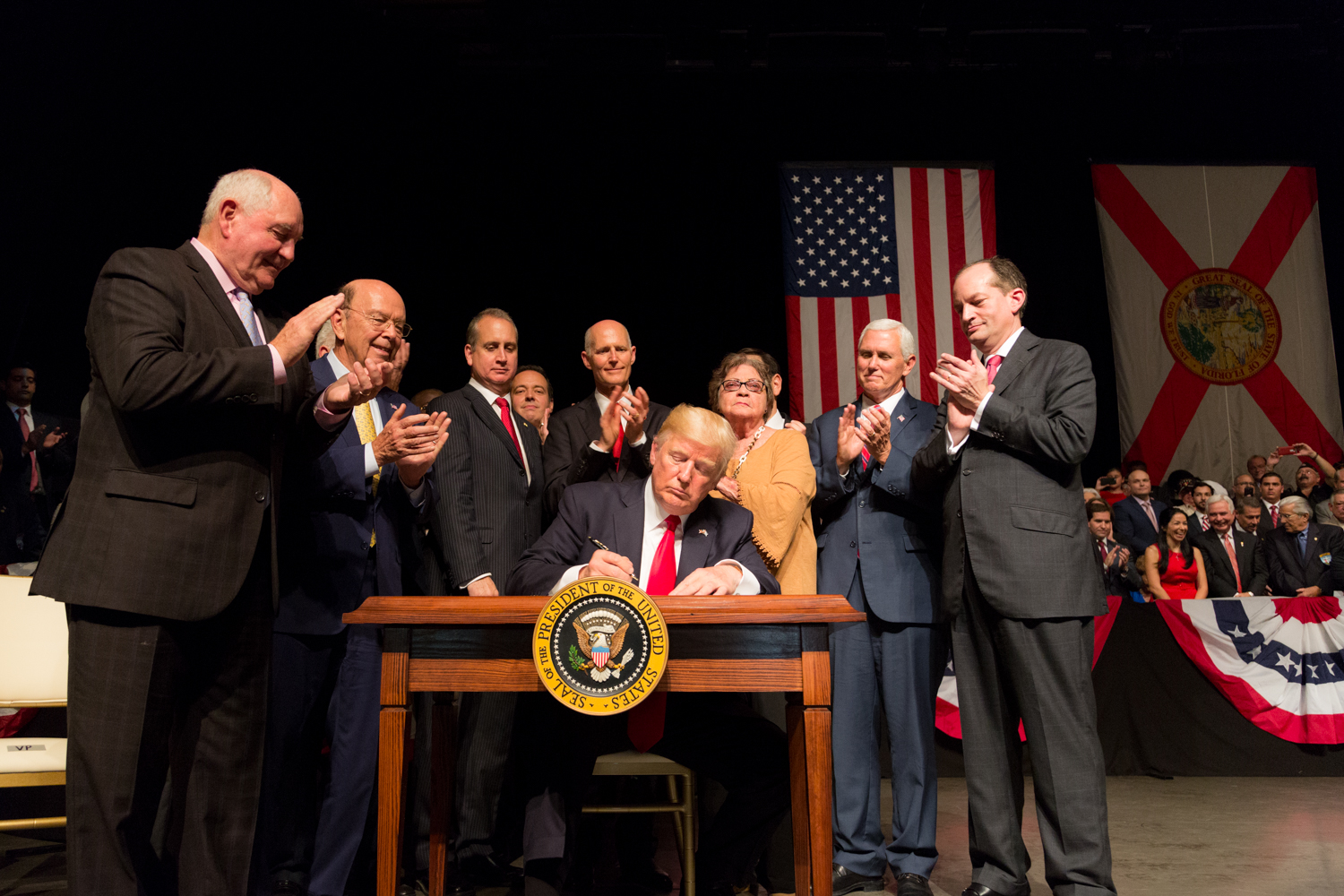
President Donald Trump in Miami on June 16, 2017, signing Cuban policy.

In November 2017, it was announced that President Donald Trump's administration had enacted new rules which would re-enforce the business and travel restrictions which were loosened by the Obama administration and would go into effect on November 9. Trump criticized aspects of the Cuban thaw, suggesting he could suspend the normalization process during his campaign. In June 2017, President Trump announced that he was suspending the policy for unconditional sanctions relief for Cuba, while also leaving the door open for a "better deal" between the U.S. and Cuba. The following November, it was announced that the business and travel restrictions which were loosened would be reinstated and they went into effect on 9 November. In June 2019, the Trump administration announced new restrictions on American travel to Cuba. The administration's policy aimed to impose new restrictions with regards to travel and funding with baseline funding available for functioning diplomatic relations and embassy operation.

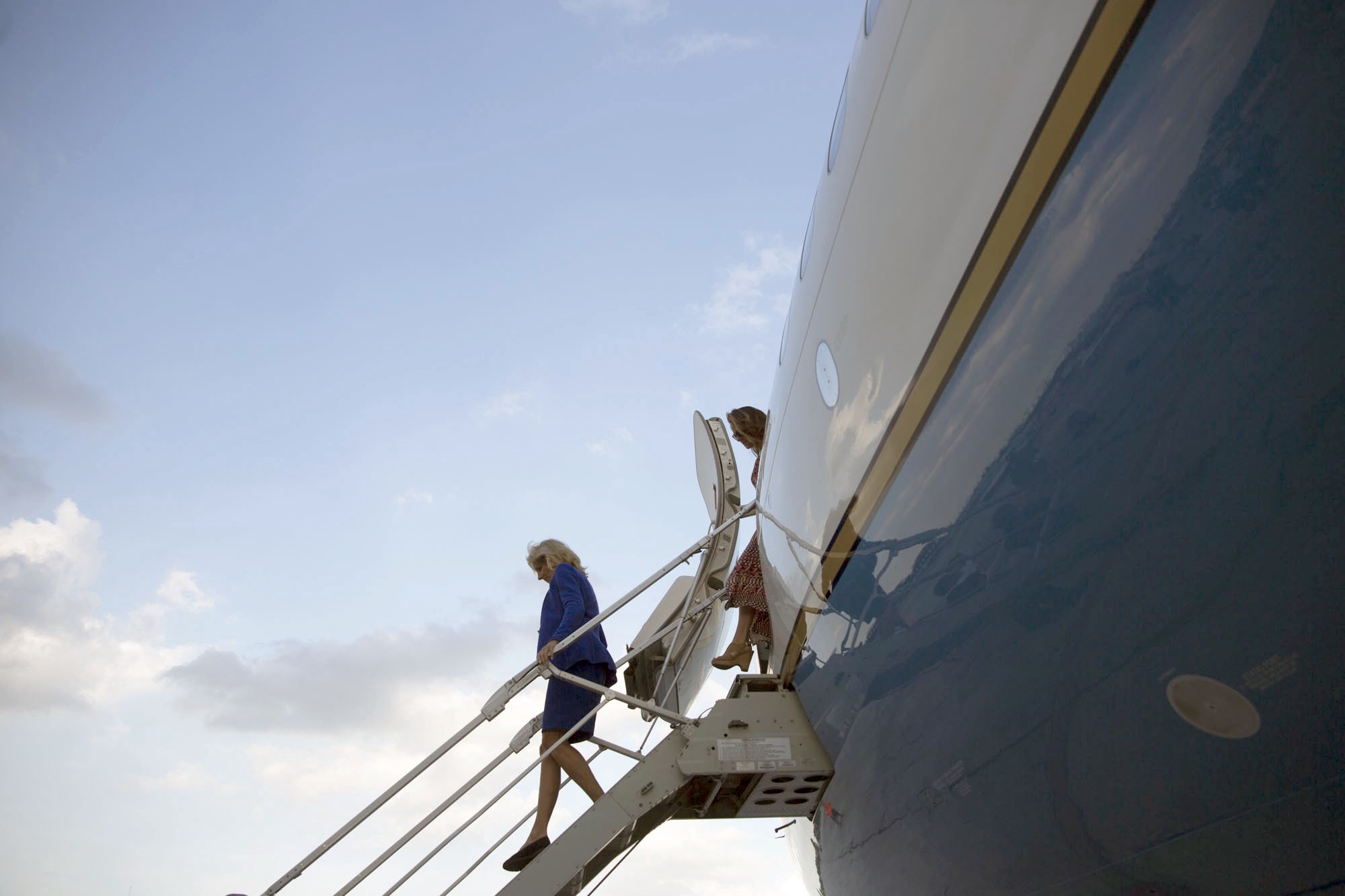
Then–Second Lady Jill Biden visits Cuba, October 2016

In August 2017, American and Canadian diplomats stationed in Havana had experienced unusual physical symptoms ("Havana syndrome") affecting the brain—including hearing loss, dizziness, and nausea. American investigators have been unable to identify the cause of these symptoms. In September 2017, the U.S. ordered nonessential diplomats and families out of Cuba as a result of these health issues. On 12 January 2021, the U.S. State Department re-added Cuba to its list of state sponsors of terrorism. Secretary of State Mike Pompeo stated that Cuba harbored several American fugitives, including Assata Shakur, as well as members of the Colombian National Liberation Army and supported the regime of Nicolás Maduro. This decision was interpreted as being linked to the support of President Trump by the Cuban-American community during the 2020 U.S. election.

The administration of President Joe Biden largely kept the renewed embargo in place, further straining diplomatic relations due to humans rights issues. During his campaign, he expressed interest in lifting certain restrictions. In 2021, the Biden administration was labeled as "tougher than Donald Trump on the island's government". The U.S. government eased some of travel restrictions imposed by the Trump administration. In May 2022, the U.S. refused to invite Cuba to attend the 9th Summit of the Americas, drawing criticism from other Latin American countries. In June 2021, the Biden administration continued America's tradition of voting against an annual United Nations General Assembly resolution calling for an end to the U.S. economic embargo against Cuba.

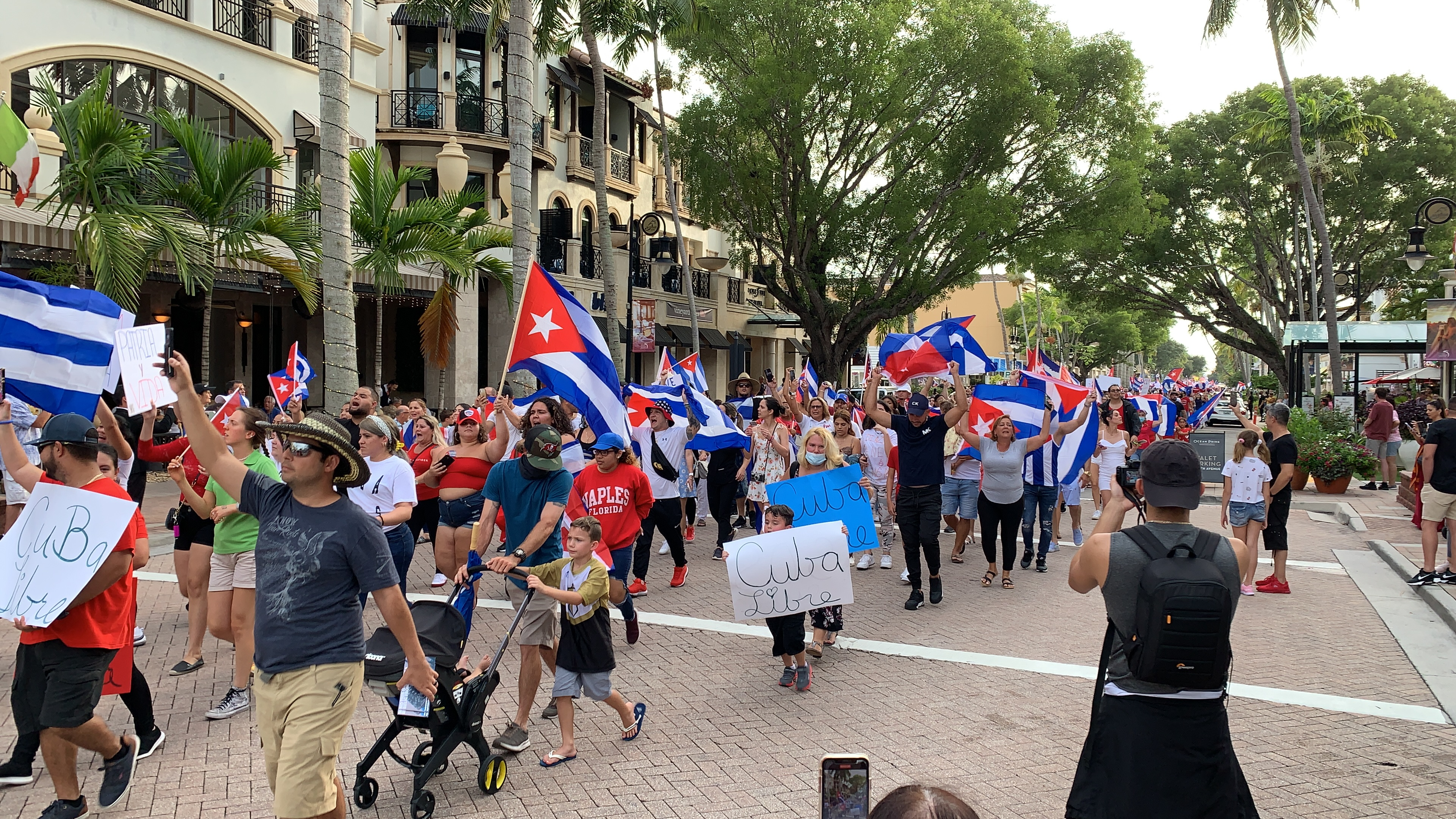
A protest against the Cuban Communist Party and in support of the U.S. embargo in Naples, Florida, 2021

In July 2021, there was a protest at the White House, demanding tougher U.S. sanctions on Cuba. The Biden administration thereafter sanctioned a key Cuban official and a government special forces unit known as the Boinas Negras for human rights abuses that year. On July 22, President Biden made a formal statement to Cuban American leaders: "I unequivocally condemn the mass detentions and sham trials that are unjustly sentencing to prison those who dared to speak out in an effort to intimidate and threaten the Cuban people into silence." He ordered the U.S. government to enhance political backing to Cuban dissidents and increase Internet access on the island. The U.S. sanctioned three additional Cuban officials who were also reportedly involved in the suppression of anti-government protesters in August 2021. At year-end, 114 Democratic House members signed a letter urging President Biden to ease food and medicine-related sanctions on Cuba.

In January 2022, the U.S. government sanctioned more Cuban officials, this time placing travel restrictions on eight members of the Cuban government. In May 2022, he adjusted this travel ban to accommodate a family reunification program. The U.S. formally accused Cuba of "not cooperating fully" in the battle against terrorism that month. Cuba retaliated by attempting to embargo the U.S. by banning U.S. cash deposits at Cuban banks but had to reverse the ban due to economic distress in 2023. This Cuban-led embargo led to Cuba facing a shortage of medicine, food, and gasoline.

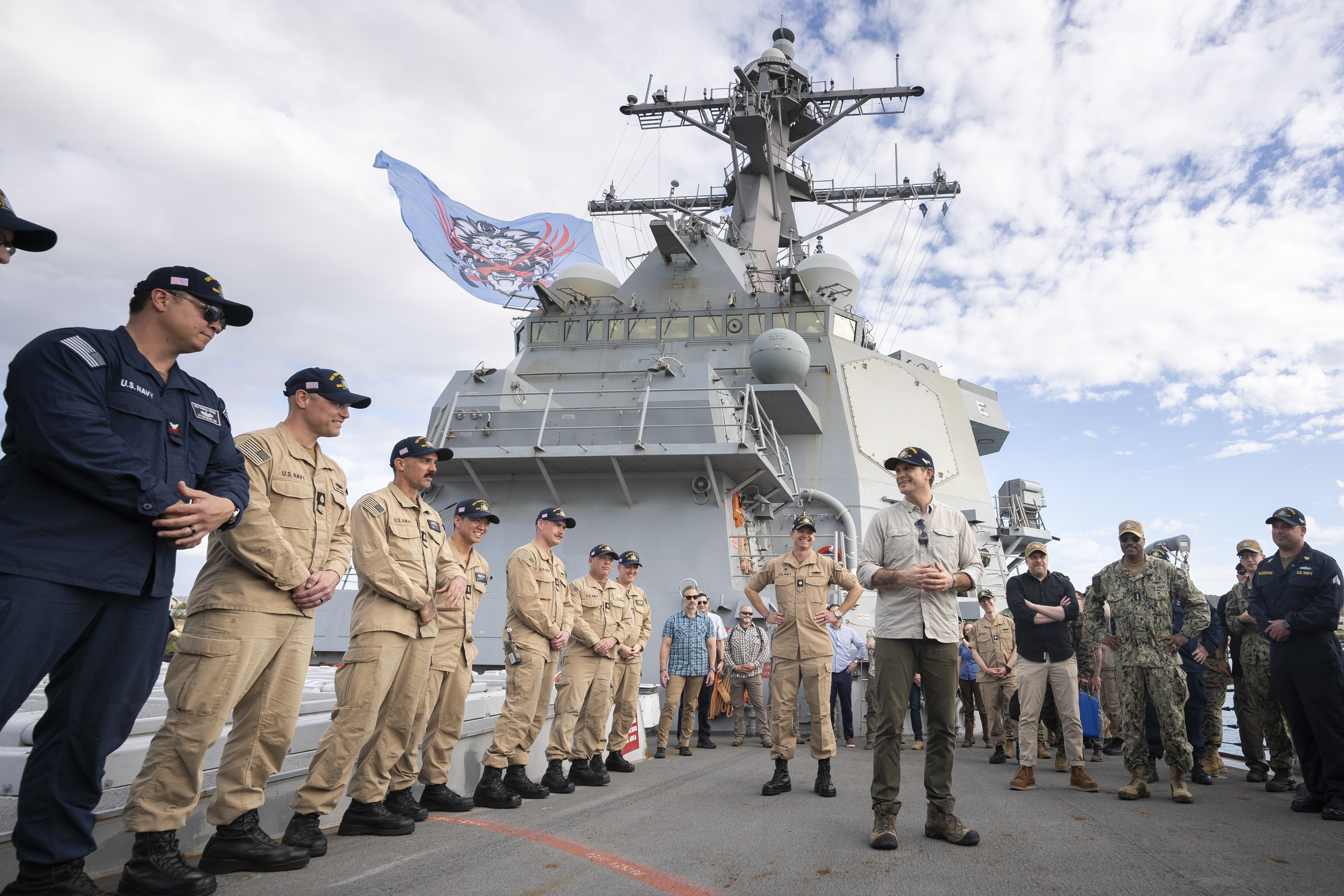
U.S. Defense Secretary Pete Hegseth aboard a ship on Guantanamo Bay Naval Base, 2025

A report by the Office of the Director of National Intelligence (ODNI) stated that Cuban officials worked to build relationships with members of the American media who held sympathetic views of the Cuban government in order to discredit U.S. politicians viewed as hostile to the Cuban state during the 2022 United States elections. During the 2024 United States elections, according to the ODNI, the Cuban government undertook "localized influence operations that are much more narrowly focused on opposing anti-regime candidates in the United States". The U.S. government briefly removed, under President Biden, but then re-instated, under President Trump, Cuba on their known international sponsors of terrorism list in January 2025, in concert with a prisoner exchange.

In February 2025 the U.S. government halted foreign aid funding for Cuba-focused media outlets and expanded visa restrictions related to Cuban programs that send healthcare and other workers overseas over forced labor concerns. President Trump issued a presidential directive in July for greater enforcement of the Cuban travel ban, further isolating the tourism industry of Cuba. The U.S. government banned First Secretary of the Communist Party of Cuba Miguel Díaz-Canel along with two ministers from entering the U.S., later restricting access the Cuban luxury real estate sector. During 2025, 100 Cuban athletes were denied visas to compete in qualifying events held in the United States for the 2028 Summer Olympics.

On 3 January 2026, 32 Cuban troops were killed in Venezuela during the 2026 United States intervention in Venezuela. It was the biggest loss of Cuban combatants by the US military since the Bay of Pigs invasion in April 1961. Afterwards, Trump stated that the Venezuelan supply of oil to Cuba would be terminated and urged Cuba to "make a deal". Sales of oil from Venezuela to Cuba have been cut off since the operation.

On 29 January 2026, Trump signed an executive order targeting Cuba, declaring a national emergency and allowing the US to impose tariffs on imports from countries supplying Cuba with oil. The administration claimed that Cuba has links to Hamas and Hezbollah and represents "an unusual and extraordinary threat to US national security and foreign policy". Mexico halted oil shipments to Cuba following the announcement; however, President Claudia Sheinbaum said the decision was a sovereign decision, not due to pressure from Trump. On February 12, UN experts have condemned the executive order issued by the Trump administration, describing the imposition of a fuel blockade on Cuba as “a serious violation of international law and a grave threat to a democratic and equitable international order.” This situation has become known as the 2026 Cuban crisis.

On 6 March 2026, it was reported that the United States Attorney for the Southern District of Florida, Jason Reding Quiñones, had established a working group comprising federal prosecutors and officials from the Drug Enforcement Administration to pursue criminal cases against individuals connected to the Cuban government and Communist Party of Cuba. Several Florida lawmakers, including former Florida Governor Rick Scott and Representatives María Elvira Salazar and Carlos Gimenez, called on the Trump administration to reopen its investigation into the 1996 shootdown of Brothers to the Rescue aircraft.

On 13 March 2026, First Secretary of the Communist Party of Cuba Miguel Díaz-Canel publicly confirmed for the first time that his administration was engaged in diplomatic talks with the United States aimed at addressing the severe U.S.‑imposed oil and energy blockade that had left Cuba facing crippling fuel shortages and widespread power outages.

In May 2026, the Trump administration announced plans to unseal criminal charges against Raúl Castro, the former First Secretary of the Communist Party of Cuba, based on a 1996 incident in which Cuban jets shot down two civilian aircraft operated by the Cuban exile group Brothers to the Rescue. Federal prosecutors expected to unseal the indictment in Miami on May 20, 2026, following approval by a grand jury.

On 14 May 2026, CIA Director John Ratcliffe met with Cuban officials in Havana, according to the Cuban government, which stated that the meeting aimed to improve political dialogue amid complex bilateral relations. The talks came a day after Cuba's energy minister announced that the country had "absolutely no fuel" — no diesel or fuel oil — due to the US-imposed blockade, triggering protests in Havana where residents faced blackouts lasting up to 22 hours.

In July 2026, the Trump administration imposed sanctions on numerous Cuban organizations including the Ministry of Tourism, port operator GEMAR, and importer GECOMEX.

On September 8, 2026, Cuban President Miguel Diaz-Canel firmly declared that his country would "never again" submit to colonial rule by any foreign power. His remarks came in direct response to a controversial social media post by U.S. President Donald Trump, who had shared a map depicting Cuba and several other territories adorned with the colors of the American flag.

In a statement published on the social media platform X, Diaz-Canel reflected on Cuba's historical experience with foreign domination, noting that the island nation is all too familiar with the realities of colonialism and neocolonialism under two successive empires. Without making explicit reference to Trump's post, he stressed that the sacrifices made for Cuba's independence, sovereignty, and right to self-determination would not be in vain, and vowed to defend these principles "to the last consequences."

Trump had posted the image on his Truth Social account a day earlier, on September 7. The illustration featured the U.S. flag superimposed over a broad geographic area, including Mexico, Canada, Cuba, Greenland, Iceland, and various nations across the Caribbean and Central America.

Cuban Foreign Minister Bruno Rodriguez responded with a tone of sarcasm, suggesting that such cartographic representations might leave American citizens geographically confused. He remarked that they may soon lose track of which gulf, lake, building, country, continent, or even planet they inhabit.

These diplomatic exchanges take place against a backdrop of escalating tensions between Havana and Washington, now at their most acute level in decades. Since early 2026, the Trump administration has enforced a "maximum pressure" campaign against Cuba, which includes an oil blockade and a series of secondary sanctions introduced in May. These measures have discouraged foreign companies from engaging in business activities on the island. Additionally, the United States has kept the option of military intervention on the table, a prospect that continues to weigh heavily on Cuban officials.

On the same day as Trump's map post, Minister Rodriguez reported that the U.S. economic embargo had inflicted losses totaling $8.08 billion on Cuba during the twelve-month period from March 2025 to February 2026—marking the highest annual figure ever recorded and representing a 7 percent increase over the previous year. He characterized these punitive measures as a form of "cruel collective punishment" directed at the Cuban populace.

Compounding these external pressures, Cuba continues to grapple with a severe domestic energy crisis. The nation's gross domestic product shrank by 15 percent between 2020 and 2025, and independent projections suggest that the economy could contract by an additional 10.3 percent over the current year.

== Trade relations ==
The U.S. has maintained a comprehensive trade embargo against Cuba since 1960. Under the Trade Sanctions Reform and Export Enhancement Act of 2000, exports from the U.S. to Cuba in the industries of food and medical products are permitted with the proper licensing and permissions from the U.S. Commerce Department and U.S. Treasury. Trade relations were temporarily eased between 2015 to 2017 in an effort as the Cuban thaw under U.S. president Barack Obama. Trade relations deteriorated once more during the late-2010s under U.S. President Donald Trump and Joe Biden with nearly all commercial restrictions re-activated by the early-2020s. In 2025, the U.S. government announced enhanced enforcement of the trade embargo.

=== Cuban medical missions ===
Cuba’s medical missions, a key export service, have long been a source of diplomatic and trade tensions with the United States. In 2025, U.S. Secretary of State Marco Rubio expanded these sanctions, restricting visas for Cuban officials and global collaborators. Caribbean leaders, reliant on Cuban doctors, have pushed back, with some, like Barbados' prime minister Mia Mottley, condemning the U.S. stance. Amid bipartisan U.S. opposition, Cuba continues to provide medical aid to nations worldwide, generating revenue and maintaining trade partnerships.

== Academic relations ==
Academic relations between the two nations have fluctuated, but have generally been limited since 1959. Breaking diplomatic ties 1961 stopped the routine flow of intellectual exchanges. As relations improved between the U.S. and Soviet Union in the 1970s, increased academic ties with Cuba became possible. American universities established departments of Cuban studies, while some Cuban universities set up American studies programs. President Jimmy Carter relaxed travel restrictions in the late-1970s, but Reagan reimposed them after 1981. As the Cold War ended in the late 1980s, restrictions were again relaxed. Under President Bill Clinton, a 1999 executive directive granted licenses to universities for study abroad programs in Cuba in 1999. In 2001, President George W. Bush reversed that decision, restricting travel through new legislation and the renewal of older laws. Under President Barack Obama restrictions were cut back, but were reimposed under Presidents Donald Trump and Joe Biden.

== Guantánamo Bay ==
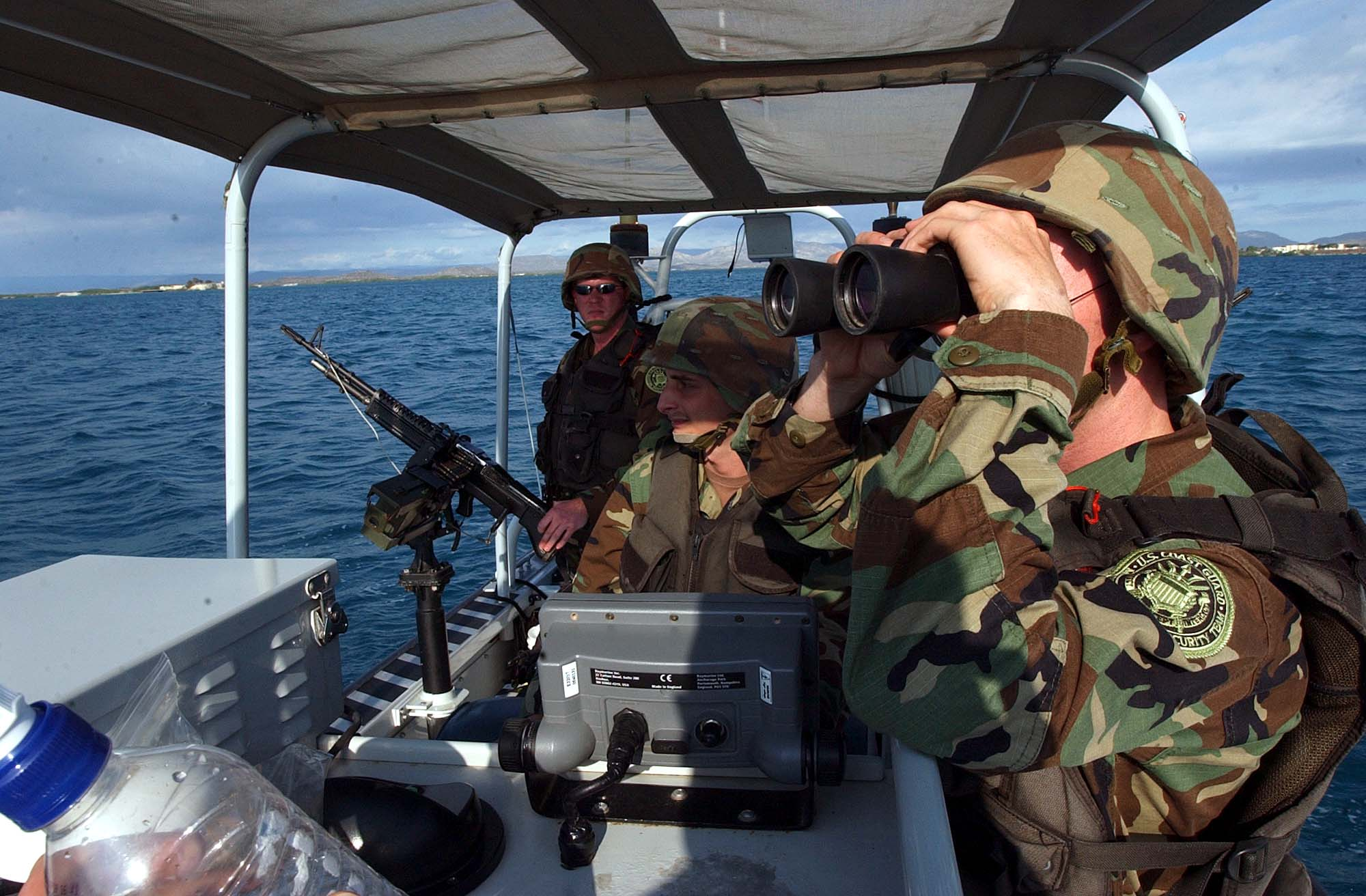
The U.S. Coast Guard on Guantánamo Bay, 2005

The U.S. government operates a naval base on the island's Guantánamo Bay, which houses a military installation, coaling station, and detention camp. Since 1974, the U.S. has paid the Cuban government $4,085 per year to lease the bay. The lease was previously $2,000 per year (paid in gold) until 1934, when it was set to match the value of gold in dollars. The military base is located on 45 square miles (117 km^{2}) of land and water on the shore of the bay at the southeastern end of Cuba. The ownership and operation of the naval base has been politically contentious amid broader bilateral relations. The leasing of land like the Guantánamo Bay tract was one of the requirements of the Platt Amendment, conditions for the withdrawal of U.S. troops remaining in Cuba following the Spanish–American War.

== Diplomatic representation ==
U.S. representation in Cuba is handled by the United States Embassy in Havana, and there is a similar Cuban Embassy in Washington, D.C. Both embassies have waived their ambassadorial representations, and are instead overseen by respective chargés d'affaires as their diplomatic envoys.

== See also ==
- Americans in Cuba and Cuban Americans
- Cuban thaw: a two-year warming of relations
- Canada–Cuba relations and Cuba–Mexico relations
