= Cuentapropista =

Economic group in Cuba

Cuentapropista (Spanish: kwen.t̪a.pɾo.ˈpis.t̪a) is a Cuban term for a person who lives from his own business and is a "non-state" worker. The term is often used in Argentina, Paraguay and Uruguay as well, however, in most other Spanish-speaking countries, this would be referred to as a "trabajador por cuenta propia" and/or "trabajador autónomo". According to the Cuban Ministry of Labor and Social Security (MTSS) statistics, a total of 580,828 Cubans were self-employed at the end of 2018, representing 13 percent of the country's workforce.

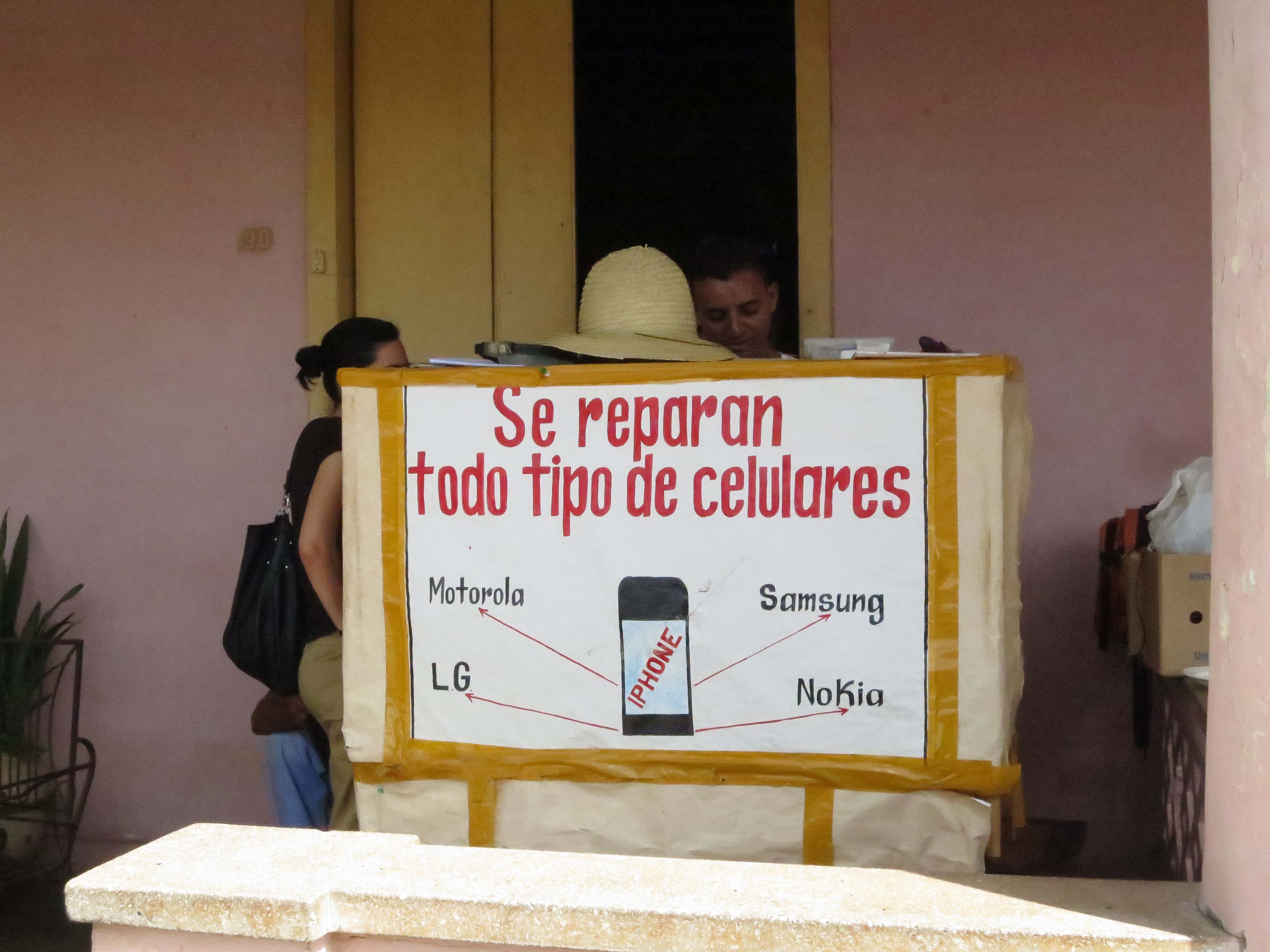
A Cuentapropista phone repair in Havana, 2012

== History and growth ==
Since 2010, during Raul Castro's leadership, the Cuban government legitimized and began to regulate the class of self-employed workers. The class of Cuentapropistas was organized and registered economical reforms in 2010-2011, which were referred to by some as the "New Cuban Economy".

Of the nearly 600,000 self-employed, 33% are women. The most represented sectors are restaurants (palates and cafes), with 9% of licenses; transportation (taxis, 9%) and private leasing of residences (6%), an increasingly popular tourist accommodation option. 123 professions can be registered as Cuentapropista, most of which are low-skill jobs such as knife sharpener, purse knitter, palm tree trimmer, button upholsterer, and sheep shearer, and none of which are in manufacturing or industry.

During 2019, the MTSS announced that state actors will be permitted to sell excess produce to Cuentapropistas using either of the official currencies of Cuba.
