= Lorna Burdsall =

American dancer and choreographer (1928-2010)

- Born: 1928; Preston, Connecticut, U.S.
- Died: 2010 (aged 81–82); Havana, Cuba
- Occupations: Dancer, choreographer
- Movement: Modern dance
- Spouse: Manuel Piñeiro (m. 1955; div. 1975)
- Children: 1

Lorna Burdsall (1928–2010) was an American dancer and choreographer who was a founding member and director of the Danza Contemporanea de Cuba. From 1955 to 1975, she was married to Cuban intelligence official Manuel Piñeiro.

Following her divorce from Piñeiro, Burdsall became the National Director of Dance and Modern Dance in Cuba, and was an advisor on modern dance to Cuba's Minister of Culture.

== Biography ==
Lorna Burdsall was born in 1928, in Preston, Connecticut. She was interested in dance as a child, and as a young adult she studied at the American Dance Festival in New London, Connecticut, training with dancers such as Martha Graham and José Limón, whom she drew influence from later in life. After attaining a master's degree in psychology but being unable to find work in the field, Burdsall began teaching dance at the College of William & Mary in Virginia. This was short-lived, however, and she quit after being unable to take her students to perform at a Black high school.

In 1953, while studying dance at the Juilliard School in New York City, Burdsall met Manuel Piñeiro, the son of a Cuban alcohol distributor who was studying business administration at Columbia University. She married Piñeiro in 1955, one year after graduating from Juilliard.

=== Marriage to Manuel Piñeiro ===
After marrying Piñiero in 1955, Burdsall moved with him to Cuba. At first, she was not fully aware of his involvement with the Cuban Revolution, but eventually she began to help her husband and his fellow revolutionaries. While pregnant with their child, she hid guns and ammunition in their Havana apartment, most of which were sent to arm guerrillas training with her husband in the Sierra Maestra mountains. After the Revolution, her husband was appointed the deputy Minister of the Interior of Cuba, then helmed a top intelligence position within the country.

Burdsall divorced Manuel Piñeiro in 1975.

== Career ==
Burdsall was a founding member of the Conjunto Nacional de Danza Moderna, now the Danza Contemporanea de Cuba. Burdsall blended Afro-Cuban elements with North American and European modern dance training. She performed there for 15 years, later becoming director of the company. In 1977, Burdsall became the National Director of Dance and Modern Dance, and was an advisor on modern dance to Cuba's Minister of Culture. After leaving the Danza Contemporanea de Cuba, Burdsall founded Así Somos, an experimental modern dance company based in performance art. The company performed out of her own apartment in Havana, where she had taken down walls to make more space for the dancers.

Lorna Burdsall died in Havana, in 2010.

== Awards and honours ==
- Award for Distinction for Natural Culture of Cuba (1982)
- Medal for 25 Years of Artistic Movement (1985)
- Cuban National Dance Prize (2008)

== Legacy ==
Since Burdsall's death in 2010, the Performing Arts branch of the Union of Writers and Artists in Cuba (UNEAC) has awarded the Premio de Danza Lorna Burdsall, a yearly award which recognizes lifetime achievement in dance. It is the highest honor that the UNEAC awards.
