= Jewish Policy Center =

Conservative think tank

The Jewish Policy Center, founded in 1985 and located in Washington, D.C., is a conservative 501c(3) non-profit think tank providing perspectives and analysis by scholars and academics on fields such as "American defense capability, U.S.-Israel relations", and "advocates for small government, low taxes, free trade, fiscal responsibility, energy security, as well as free speech and intellectual diversity".

According to Matthew Brooks, Executive Director of both the Jewish Policy Center and the Republican Jewish Coalition, the Policy Center is nonpartisan and focuses instead on issues, both foreign and domestic. Center fellows include Norman Podhoretz, Michael Medved and Ruth Wisse.

The Center has sponsored many forums around the country billed as "Liberal Roots, Conservative Solutions". It has lobbied for school vouchers, supported the 2004 Israeli withdrawal from Gaza, and worked to draw attention to antisemitism on American college campuses.

In August 2024, the Jewish Policy Center was criticized for a message it posted on its official account on X (formerly Twitter) concerning Christian clergy and civilians sheltering in churches in Gaza City during an Israeli military offensive. On August 26, Leaders of the Greek Orthodox and Latin Patriarchates had stated that priests, nuns, and families were remaining in Saint Porphyrius Orthodox Church and Holy Family Catholic Church to care for the elderly, disabled, women, and children unable to leave. The day after, the Center wrote: “If Gaza Christians believe Israel will not conduct its war in Gaza City, they are mistaken. They have implanted themselves in a battlefield. They are part of the battle. If they are looking for martyrdom, well…”. The post was deleted several hours later. Palestinian Catholic and human rights scholar Khalil Sayegh criticized the Center, saying its post targeted Christians and called for their killing. He noted that the post was later deleted, but the organization did not issue an apology or respond to requests for comment.
