= Citizens Committee for a Free Cuba =

The Citizens Committee for a Free Cuba was an anti-Castro organization in the United States. In its own words, it was set up for the purpose of fostering "a nationwide discussion on the problem of Cuba" and the "threat its Communist regime poses to the Americas, and the measures that must be taken to put an end to it". The group was set up in April 1963 in response to a statement put out by Freedom House calling for the formation of such an organisation. It published a newsletter called the Free Cuba News.

Its membership was constituted by a number of leading public figures in American life who came from a variety of professional backgrounds, such as Clare Boothe Luce, Sidney Hook, Hans Morgenthau and Edward Teller. Among its members were also high-profile trade union officials, such as Jay Lovestone, Paul Hall, Irving Brown, and Joseph A. Beirne, and members of the American political and military class such as Admiral Arleigh Burke, Brigadier General S. L. A. Marshall, and General Frank L. Howley. Paul Bethal, who was the former head of the U.S. Information Agency, served as its executive director.

== See also ==
- Center for a Free Cuba
- Commission for Assistance to a Free Cuba
- Crusade to Free Cuba Committee
