= Manuel Piñeiro =

Cuban revolutionary leader and government minister (1933–1998)

Deputy Minister of the Interior of Cuba
- In office 1964–1968
- Prime Minister: Fidel Castro
- Minister: Ramiro Valdés Menéndez

Personal details
- Born: Manuel Piñeiro Losada; March 14, 1933 Matanzas, Cuba
- Died: March 11, 1998 (aged 64) Havana, Cuba
- Resting place: Colon Cemetery, Havana
- Party: Communist Party of Cuba
- Spouses: Lorna Burdsall (m. 1955; div. 1975) Marta Harnecker (m. 1975)
- Children: 2
- Education: Columbia University
- Nickname: Commander Barbarroja

Military service
- Allegiance: 26th of July Movement; Cuban Revolutionary Armed Forces
- Years of service: 1955–1998
- Rank: Commander

Manuel Piñeiro Losada (14 March 1933 – 11 March 1998), also known as Commander Barbarroja ("red beard" in Spanish), was a Cuban political and military figure, a leader of the Cuban Revolution, and, between 1961 and 1964, the first head of the Dirección General de Inteligencia of Cuba. Under Piñeiro, the DGI supported armed struggles in Latin America, helping radical leftist guerrilla groups in the region. Between 1964 and 1968, Piñeiro acted as the Deputy Minister of the Interior of Cuba, during this time he was in charge of the state security apparatus. A Soviet reorganization of the DGI forced Piñeiro out of his position, and he was placed in charge of the DGI's Latin American affairs division.

== Biography ==
Manuel Piñeiro Losada was born on 14 March 1933 in Matanzas, Cuba. His family, who had immigrated to Cuba from the Spanish region of Galicia, was relatively prosperous—his father was a Bacardi executive. After participating in the student protests against the 10 March 1952 coup d'état which brought dictator Fulgencio Batista to power, Piñeiro's family sent him to study business management at Columbia University in New York. There, he met his first wife, Lorna Burdsall, whom he married in 1955. While studying in the United States, Piñeiro began to oppose the social, racial, and political discrimination he saw there and felt the need to return to Cuba. He returned in 1955 and became a founder of the 26th of July Movement.

Soon after returning to Cuba, Piñiero was arrested by Batista's security agencies because of his underground political activities. After his release, he continued his clandestine activities in Havana. He discovered that he was under police surveillance, and decided that it was better to leave for the Eastern Sierra Maestra mountain range and join the guerrillas headed by Fidel Castro. After the Cuban Revolution, Piñiero was appointed Deputy Minister of the Interior and the head of the Technical Viceministerio, the body that would be later responsible for gathering intelligence and developing strategies to expand communism in Latin America. In 1997, Piñeiro announced his retirement, resigning from all active government positions. He began to write and edit books about his experience in the Cuban Revolution.

Piñeiro died in a car accident on March 11, 1998. He was on his way home after receiving a tribute commemorating the creation of the Eastern Front.

== Role in the Cuban Revolution ==
In March 1958, he was recognized for his merits and was personally chosen by Fidel Castro to be the officer tasked with integrating the recently created Eastern Front II "Frank País", under the command of Fidel's younger brother, Raúl.

During that time, he held several meetings with members of the Batistas' Cuban Army. Subsequently, he was appointed Chief of Personnel and Inspection, a position that included responsibilities for the Intelligence Service and the recently created Policía Rebelde, which was a predecessor of Castro's Revolutionary Police.

During the battle for Santiago de Cuba, he was promoted to Commander of the Cuban Revolution. After the triumph of the Revolution, he was appointed "Chief of the Military Plaza" in Santiago de Cuba, the second largest city in the country.

It is at this time that his face is caught by photographic cameras for the first time, showing his red beard and revealing the reason of the nickname given to him by the rebel troops.

He was then transferred to Havana, where he served various functions in the creation of the intelligence agencies and security of the new Castro regime. During the Bay of Pigs Invasion, Piñeiro was deputy to Ramiro Valdés Menéndez, head of G-2 (Seguridad del Estado, or state security).

On June 6, 1961, he was appointed Deputy Minister of the Interior and head of the so-called Technical Viceministerio, the body that would be later responsible for gathering intelligence and developing strategies to expand communism in Latin America.

In 1965, he was appointed to the Central Committee of the Cuban Communist Party, a post he held until 1997.

That same year in Havana, he received the visit of Markus Wolf, director of the East German secret police (the Stasi). Wolf, whose real identity would only be known to the Western intelligence services in 1979, had gone to Cuba to advise the socialist government how to set up the new General Intelligence Directorate on the island.

In early 1975, Piñeiro was head of the "Américas Department" of the Cuban Communist Party's Central Committee.

In 1997, he resigned all his active government positions and started to write and edit books dedicated to a retrospective analysis of the Cuban Revolution.
