= Crusade to Free Cuba Committee =

Anti-Castro organization

- Formation: December 1961
- Founder: Sergio Arcacha Smith
- Type: Political advocacy group
- Headquarters: United States
- Region served: Cuban exile community, United States
- Key people: Sergio Arcacha Smith
- Affiliations: Cuban Revolutionary Council (formerly Cuban Democratic Revolutionary Front)

The Crusade to Free Cuba Committee was founded in December 1961 by anti-Castro Cuban exile Sergio Arcacha Smith to raise funds and support for the CIA-backed Cuban Revolutionary Council, a group formerly known as the Cuban Democratic Revolutionary Front.

== See also ==
- Citizens Committee for a Free Cuba
