= Operation Ortsac =

Proposed invasion of Cuba

- Part of the Cuban Missile Crisis
- Location: Cuba
- Planned by: United States
- Objective: Invasion of Cuba
- Date: 1962
- Outcome: Rejected

Operation Ortsac was the code name for a possible invasion of Cuba planned by the United States military in 1962.

== History ==
The name was derived from then Cuban President Fidel Castro by spelling his surname backwards.

During the Cuban Missile Crisis, upon discovery of SS-4 missiles being assembled in Cuba, the U.S. Government considered several options including a blockade (an act of war under international law, so it was called a "quarantine"), an airstrike, or a military strike against the Cuban missile positions.

The nuclear weapons supplied from the Soviet Union could be destroyed by a military strike with the help of substantial air raids before they were operational. The plans were rejected in favor of a blockade, as U.S. President John F. Kennedy was against a sneak attack.

It can be argued that an American attack could have resulted in the deaths of Soviet soldiers and lead to a retaliatory strike on the United States. Such moves would likely have resulted in World War III.

An airstrike would probably have failed to destroy in entirety all of the missiles, with many of the positions hidden to U-2 reconnaissance planes, and would also have failed to prevent Soviet Premier Nikita Khrushchev from sending further reinforcements to Cuba, making a full blown military strike deposing Castro necessary to prevent further missiles from being placed on Cuba.

After the collapse of the Soviet Union, the Russians revealed that the medium-range missiles on Cuba were already almost fully operational at that time, and operational command of smaller, battlefield-tactical nuclear missiles also present had, incredibly, been given to field officers, though that authorization was quickly rescinded.

== Order of battle ==
Cuban Invasion Force (Corps)

- 101st Airborne Division (Secure Jose Martí and San Antonio de los Baños Airfields)
- 82nd Airborne Division (Secure Mariel and Baracoa Airfields)
- 1st Marine Division (Secure beaches at Tarará)
- 2nd Marine Division (Secure beaches at Tarará)

== See also ==
- Bay of Pigs Invasion
- Operation Northwoods
- Cuban Missile Crisis
- United States embargo against Cuba
