= Commission for Assistance to a Free Cuba =

U.S. government organization

- United States Commission for Assistance to a Free Cuba

History
- Status: Inactive
- Established by: George W. Bush on October 10, 2003

Membership
- Chairperson: Condoleezza Rice; Carlos M. Gutierrez

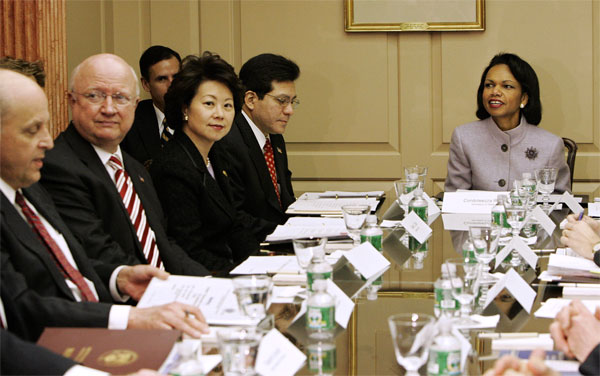
U.S. Secretary of State Condoleezza Rice convenes a meeting of the Commission in December 2005

The United States Commission for Assistance to a Free Cuba (CAFC) was created by United States President George W. Bush on October 10, 2003, to, according to him, explore ways the U.S. can help hasten and ease a democratic transition in Cuba.

== Members ==
At its inception in 2003, the commission was chaired by then-Secretary of State, Colin Powell. Since 2005, the commission has been co-chaired by Condoleezza Rice and Carlos M. Gutierrez.

Commission members include all Cabinet-level agencies. The core agencies responsible for day-to-day operations of the Commission include, the Secretary of State (chairman); Secretary of Housing and Urban Development; Secretary of the Treasury; Secretary of Commerce; Secretary of Homeland Security; the Assistant to the President for National Security Affairs; the Administrator of the United States Agency for International Development, or their designees. The core group undertakes the day-to-day work of the commission. Any US government agencies may be called upon to provide support to the commission's work by the authority granted it by National Security Presidential Directive 29 to create and task working groups.

== First report ==
The commission's first report was released to the public on May 6, 2004. It set out a plan for bringing about change on the island and outlined numerous perceived problem areas and solutions to solve them.

== Second report ==
The commission released a second report in July 2006, which built on the findings of the first report. It also issued the "Compact with the Cuban People," which pledged that the US government would assist a transition government.

== Response of Cuban government ==
Fidel Castro referred to Rice as a "mad" woman and to the US Chief of Mission in Havana, Michael E. Parmly, as a "little gangster" and a "bully." He insisted that in spite of the formation of the commission, Cuba is itself "in transition: to socialism [and] to communism" and that it is "ridiculous for the U.S. to threaten Cuba now."

== See also ==
- Cuba-United States relations
- Opposition to Fidel Castro
- Cuba and democracy
- Center for a Free Cuba
- Citizens Committee for a Free Cuba
