= William Lee Brent =

Black Panther Party member

- Brent in his home in Havana (May 1996)
- Born: William Lee Brent; 1931; Franklin, Louisiana, U.S.
- Died: November 4, 2006 (aged 75); Havana, Cuba

William Lee "Bill" Brent (1931 – November 4, 2006) was an American member of the Black Panther Party and defector, best known for hijacking a passenger jet and diverting it to Cuba in 1969, where he spent the last 37 years of his life in exile.

== Biography ==
William Lee Brent was born in 1931, in Franklin, Louisiana, and when he was 13 his family moved to Oakland, California. Brent was selling drugs and committing petty crimes by the time he was in junior high school, and at age 17 he enlisted in the U.S. Army by using a fake birth certificate. He was discharged from the army after only eight months, later serving time in juvenile hall for stealing a bicycle. In 1955, he was convicted of armed robbery and auto theft, for which he spent seven years in San Quentin State Prison. On April 21, 1964, Brent married Gloria L. Harness, age 30, in Oakland.

== Black Panther Party activity ==
In November 1968, Brent and two accomplices in a van marked "Black Panther Black Community News Service" allegedly robbed a gas station in San Francisco's Bayview district of $80. Police caught up to them on Seventh Street near the Hall of Justice, prompting a shootout, where one of the officers, Lieutenant Dermott Creedon, was critically wounded. When Brent was arrested and identified as the triggerman, Eldridge Cleaver kicked him out of the Black Panther Party, accusing him of "banditry".

After his arrest, Brent was released on bail, and on June 17, 1969, he stepped onto Trans World Airlines Flight 154 from Oakland to New York City. Brent held a .38 Caliber revolver to the pilot's head, and ordered him to fly to Cuba instead.

Brent spent 22 months in an immigration jail in Cuba when he arrived, and after his release he earned a Spanish literature degree from the University of Havana, and taught English at various junior and senior high schools. He never became a Cuban citizen, but remarried to travel writer Jane McManus (c. 1920–2005) whom he had met in Cuba. In a 1996 interview with the Associated Press, Brent said he missed the United States and the African-American community, but he was unwilling to return to possibly face life imprisonment for air piracy and kidnapping. Around 1996, Times Books published his memoirs, Long Time Gone (ISBN 0-595-00288-9), and for several years prior to his death Brent was working on a book about discrimination against Black people in Cuba.

== Death ==
Brent died from pneumonia on November 4, 2006, at age 75, while still living in Cuba.
