= Nehanda Abiodun =

African American hip hop activist (1950–2019)

- Born: Cheri Laverne Dalton; June 29, 1950; Harlem, New York City, United States
- Died: January 30, 2019 (aged 68); Havana, Cuba
- Other names: Nehanda Abiodun, Nahanda Abiodun, Nahanda Obafemi, Nahanda Obatemi, Cheri Cotton, Betty Carter, Betty W. Carter, Elizabeth Carter, Laverne Dalton, Laverne Cheri Dalton, and "Flame"
- Occupation: rap music activist
- Known for: Status as an American fugitive living in Cuba
- Height: 5 ft 8-10 in (173-178 cm)
- Status: Fugitive, fled the country
- Allegiance: The Republic of New Afrika
- Criminal charges: Armed Bank Robbery; Bank Robbery Killings; Violation of RICO Statute; Interference with Interstate Commerce by Robbery; Obstruction of Justice; Aiding and Abetting
- Reward amount: The FBI offered a reward of up to $100,000 for information leading to the arrest of Cheri Laverne Dalton
- Wanted since: November 17, 1982
- Time at large: Over 36 years

Details
- Location: Nanuet, New York

Nehanda Isoke Abiodun (born Cheri Laverne Dalton; 29 June 1950 – 30 January 2019) was an African American hip hop activist, black revolutionary, and fugitive who was living in Cuba. Abiodun was wanted by the FBI in connection of the 1981 robbery of a Brink's truck that resulted in the killing of a Brink's guard and two New York police officers. The United States federal government also charged Abiodun in connection with Assata Shakur's escape from prison, along with Susan Rosenberg.

Abiodun was active in the New African independence struggle in the U.S. and considered herself a citizen of the Republic of New Afrika.

== Early life and education ==
Born Cheri Dalton in New York City in 1950, she began her activist work with her parents as a child. At the age of ten, she was a tenant organizer. Dalton graduated from Columbia University in New York in 1972.

== Career ==
After leaving Columbia, Abiodun worked in a methadone clinic in Harlem and then at the Lincoln Detox Center, an experimental rehabilitation facility in the South Bronx. She later worked with the National Black Human Rights Coalition, and later to help heal drug addicts at the Lincoln Detox Center Black Acupuncture Association of North America with Mutulu Shakur.

== Legal issues ==
Dalton was among those linked by U.S. authorities to Assata Shakur's 1979 escape from prison. She was also wanted for a string of robberies, including the robbing of a Brink's armored car in New York in 1981.

== Life on the run ==
In 1978, Abiodun stopped using Dalton as her name. She also went by, at various times, Cheri Cotton, Betty Carter, Betty W. Carter, Elizabeth Carter, Laverne Dalton, Laverne Cheri Dalton, and "Flame".

She lived in Havana, Cuba since about 1990. She was a rap music activist there. She gave advice about African-American history, poetry, and world politics to up-and-coming Cuban hip-hop artists such as Yosmel Sarrias and Maigel Entenza Jaramillo of Anónimo Consejo.

She stated "rap music is...the voice of protest...[with which] we can educate and organize around the world. It puts a whole different light on the word globalization...Wherever you go...in the world, from New Zealand to Timbuktu, there are rappers. Wherever you go! And once you step out of the U.S., a large part of that global community of hip hoppers are progressive. Seriously, because most of it comes from the indigenous people of that particular place".

== Death ==
Abiodun died at her home in Havana on January 30, 2019, at the age of 68 after a period of declining health. Her death would be confirmed by historian Henry Louis Taylor Jr., who had been working on her biography.

Despite this, the FBI's website still lists Abiodun as a fugitive.
