= Noble Brandon Judah =

American politician

Noble Brandon Judah Jr.
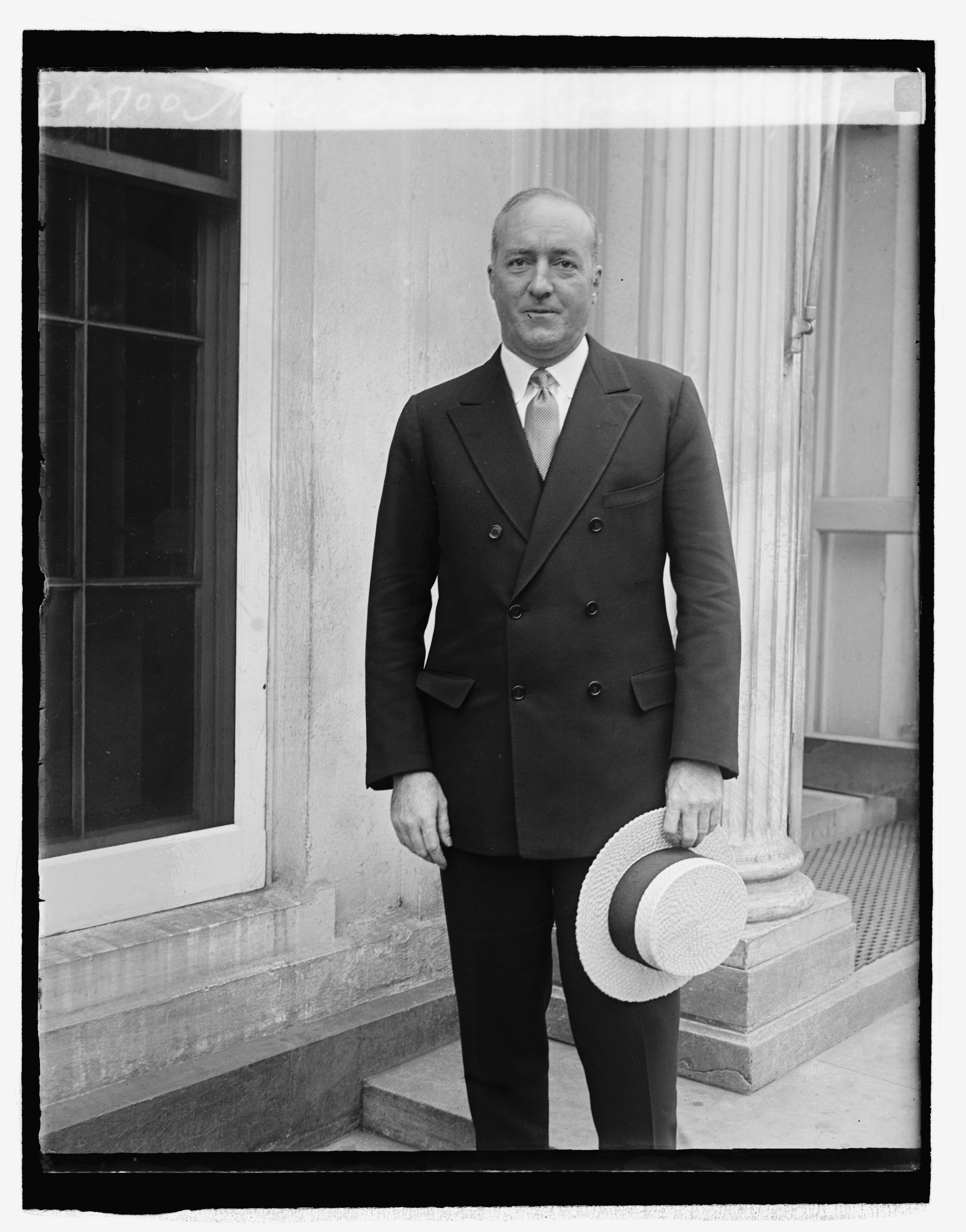
- Born: April 23, 1884; Chicago, Illinois, U.S.
- Died: February 26, 1938 (aged 53); Chicago, Illinois, U.S.
- Burial place: Oak Woods Cemetery
- Occupation: Lawyer
- Spouse: Dorothy Patterson

Noble Brandon Judah Jr. (April 23, 1884 – February 26, 1938) was an American lawyer and politician. He joined his father's successful law firm in 1907 and eventually succeeded him as a partner. He served one term in the Illinois House of Representatives and married into the National Cash Register fortune. In 1927, Calvin Coolidge appointed Judah Ambassador Extraordinary and Plenipotentiary to Cuba.

== Biography ==
Noble Brandon Judah Jr. was born in Chicago, Illinois, on April 23, 1884. Judah graduating from Brown University in 1904 and then studied law at Northwestern University Law School until 1907. Judah then joined his father's law firm of Judah, Willard, Wolf & Reichman, eventually replacing his father as partner. The firm specialized in organizing utility and energy companies. Judah served one term in the Illinois House of Representatives as a Republican from 1911 to 1912.

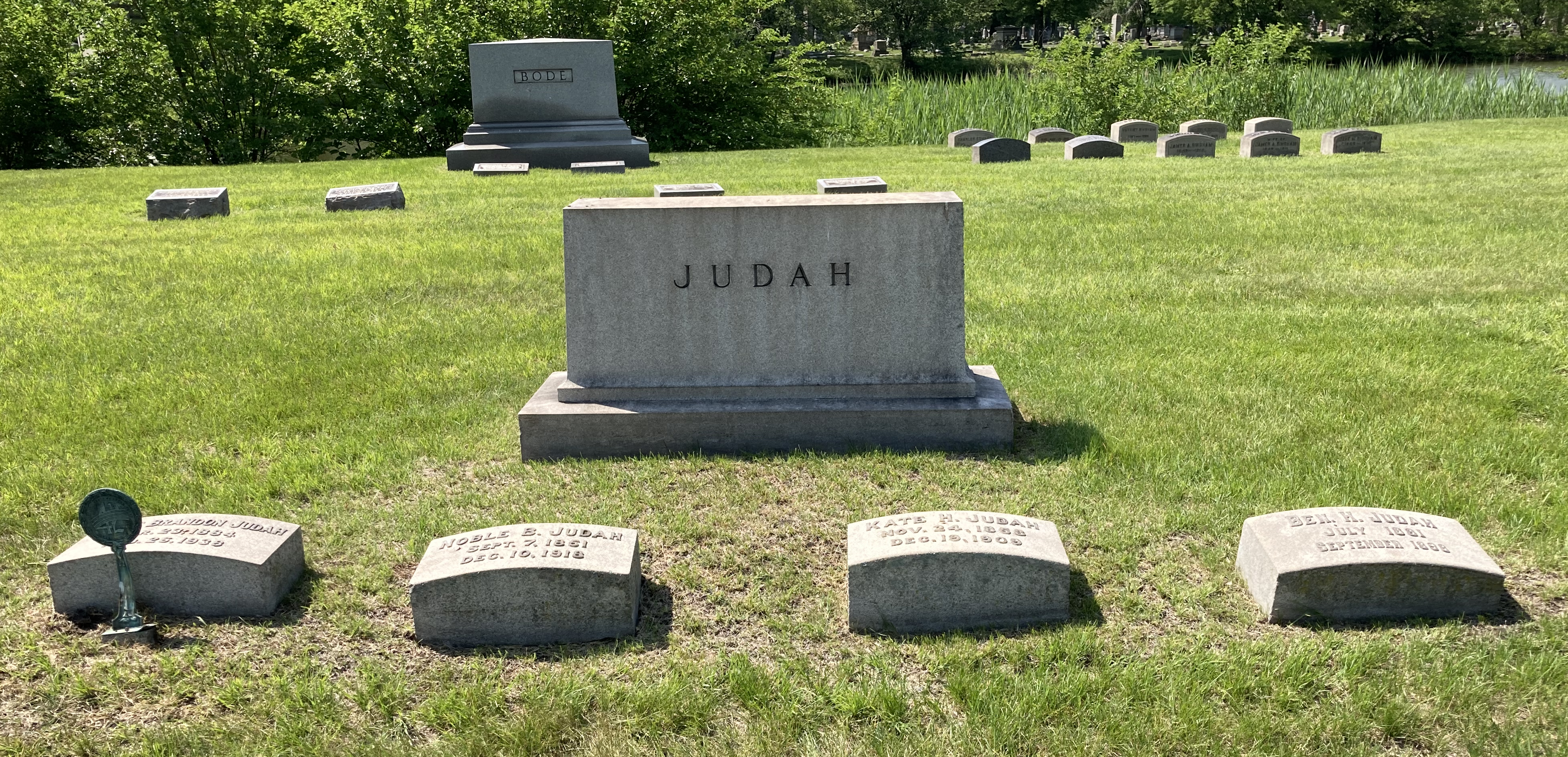
Judah's grave at Oak Woods Cemetery

Judah married Dorothy Patterson in 1917. Patterson was an heir to the National Cash Register fortune. Judah enlisted in the United States Army during World War I, serving with the 1st Field Artillery Regiment. In the mid-1920s, he began work on his estate in Lake Forest, Illinois.

In 1927, President Calvin Coolidge appointed Judah the Ambassador Extraordinary and Plenipotentiary to Cuba during a recess of the United States Senate. The Senate confirmed his appointment upon their return. Judah resigned in 1929 to focus on his law firm, now Judah Willard Wolf & Reichmann. He divorced in 1933.

Judah died in Chicago on February 26, 1938, and was buried in Oak Woods Cemetery. The law firm merged into Pam & Hurd in 1939 and today known as Schiff Hardin.

His house, the Noble Judah Estate, designed by architect Philip L. Goodwin is on the National Register of Historical Places.

Diplomatic posts
Preceded by Enoch Crowder	United States Ambassador to Cuba; 1927-1929	Succeeded by Harry Frank Guggenheim
