= Harry F. Guggenheim =

American politician and businessman (1890–1971)

Harry Frank Guggenheim
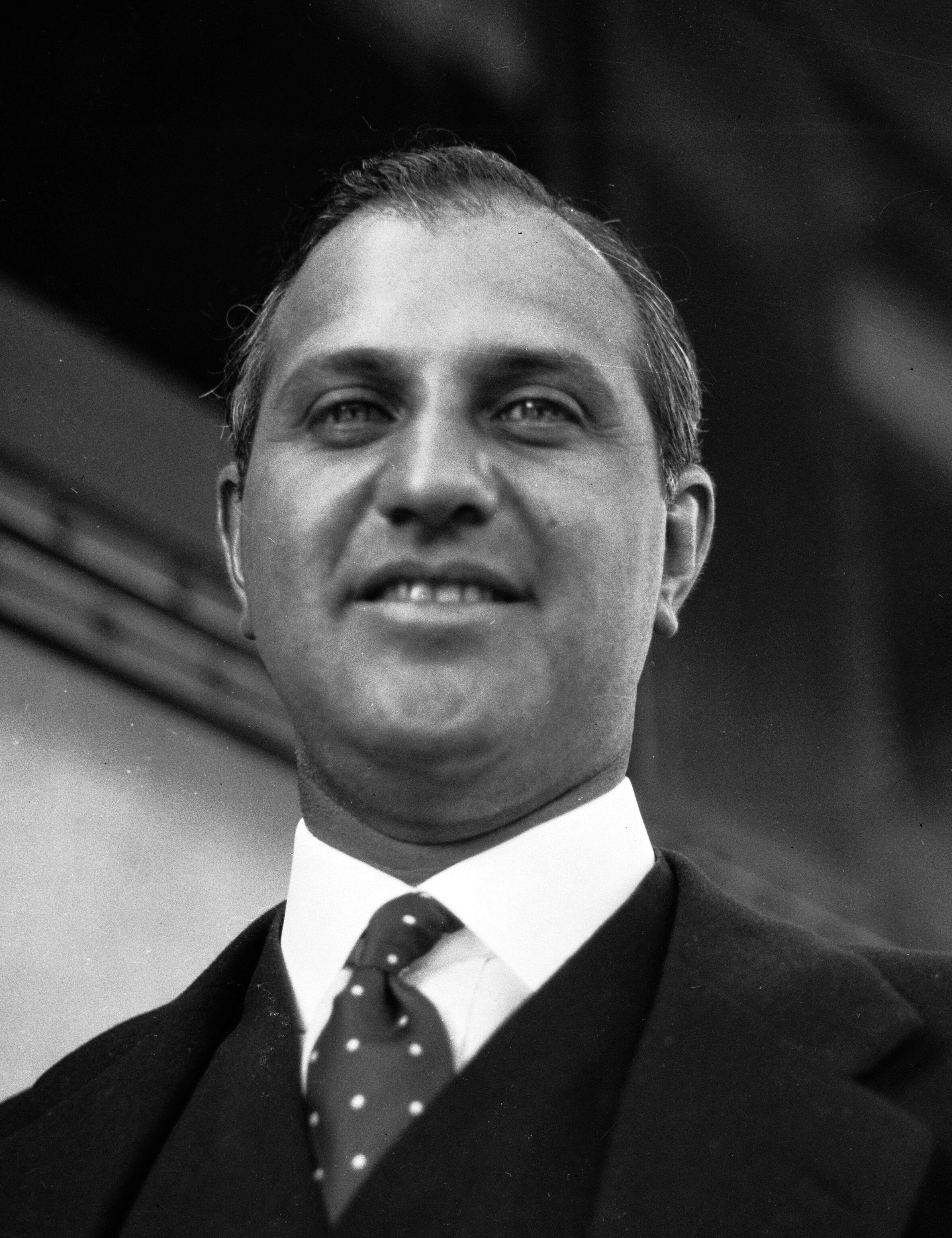

United States Ambassador to Cuba
- In office November 21, 1929 – April 2, 1933
- President: Herbert Hoover
- Preceded by: Noble Brandon Judah
- Succeeded by: Sumner Welles

Personal details
- Born: August 23, 1890 West End, New Jersey, U.S.
- Died: January 22, 1971 (aged 80) Sands Point, Long Island, New York, U.S.
- Spouses: Helen Rosenberg (m. 1910; div. 1923) Caroline Morton Potter (m. 1923; div. 1939) Alicia Patterson Brooks (m. 1939; died 1963)
- Children: 3, including Diane Hamilton
- Parent(s): Daniel Guggenheim; Florence Shloss Guggenheim
- Relatives: Guggenheim family
- Education: Columbia Grammar School; Sheffield Scientific School
- Alma mater: Pembroke College, Cambridge
- Occupation: Businessman, newspaper publishing, statesman, racehorse owner/breeder, philanthropist, aviator

Guggenheim and Jimmy Doolittle circa 1928–1930

Harry Frank Guggenheim (August 23, 1890 – January 22, 1971) was an American businessman, diplomat, publisher, philanthropist, aviator, and horseman.

== Early life ==
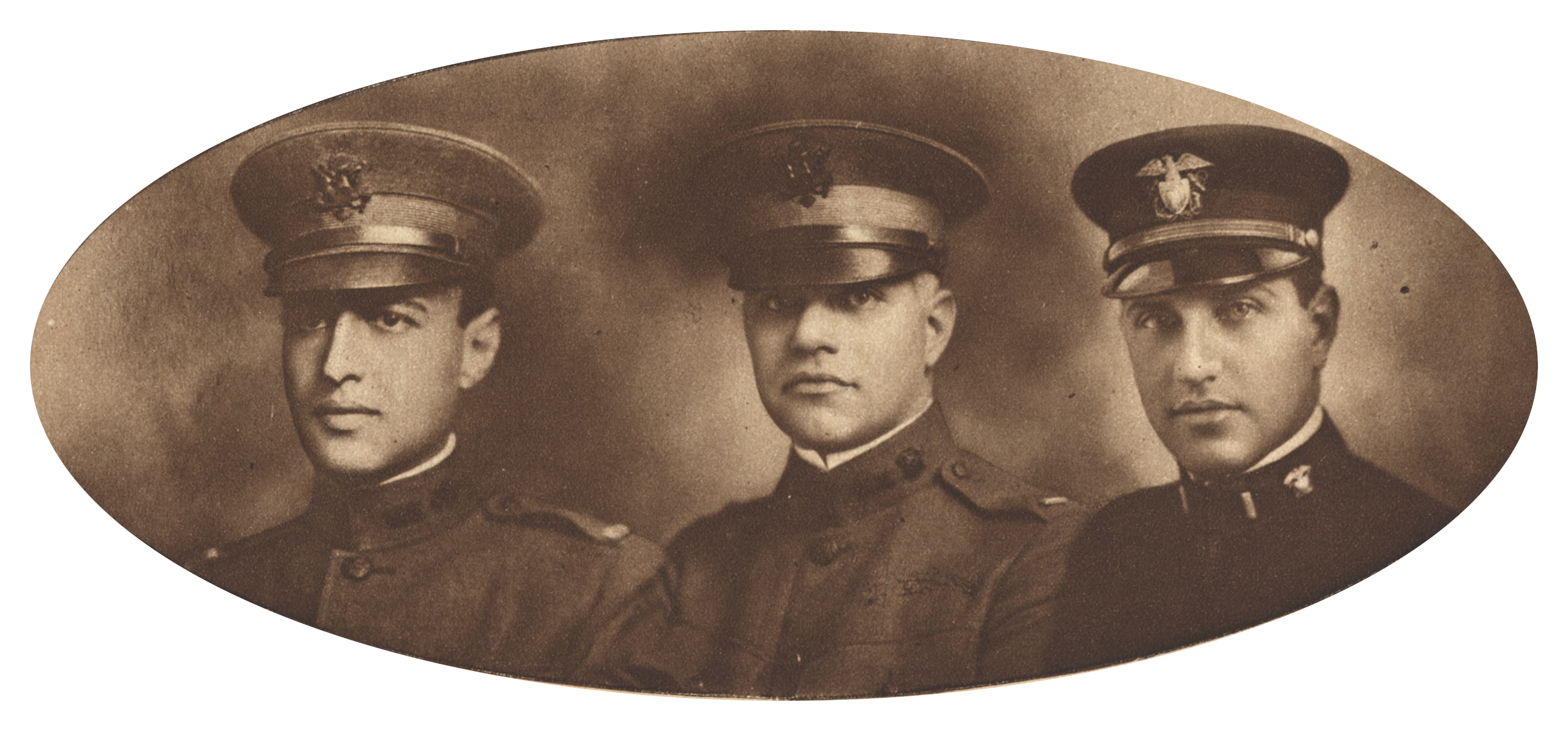
Guggenheim (right) with his brother Meyer (center) and brother-in-law Roger W. Straus c. February 1918

He was born August 23, 1890, in the West End section of Long Branch, New Jersey. He was the second son of Florence (née Shloss) Guggenheim (1863–1944) and Daniel Guggenheim. He had an older brother, U.S. Ambassador to Portugal Meyer Robert Guggenheim, and a younger sister, Gladys Guggenheim Straus. His father assumed control of the Guggenheim family enterprises after his grandfather's death in 1905, and his mother was a co-founder, and president, of the Guggenheim Foundation as well as the treasurer of the Women's National Republican Club from its inception in 1921 to 1938.

He graduated in 1907 from the Columbia Grammar School in Manhattan, and then he attended the Sheffield Scientific School of Yale University. He later left Yale and served a three-year apprenticeship at the American Smelting and Refining Company in Mexico. The company was owned by the Guggenheim family. He resumed his education in 1910 at England's Pembroke College at Cambridge University from which he was awarded a B.A. and an M.A., both in 1913.

== Career ==
In 1917, he bought a Curtiss flying boat and moved to Manhasset, New York. In September 1917, he joined the United States Navy Reserve and served overseas in France, England and Italy as a member of the First Yale Unit during World War I.

In 1920, Guggenheim wrote a response to the criticism of the living conditions in the copper mine of Chuquicamata, owned by the Guggenheim's Chile Exploration Company, which had been published in a 1917 book by Laura Jorquera.

In 1924, his parents established the Daniel and Florence Guggenheim Foundation and he was made a director and later president. He sponsored Robert H. Goddard's private research into liquid fuel rocketry and space flight. He provided funds for the establishment of the first Guggenheim School of Aeronautics at New York University in 1925. Guggenheim became president of the Daniel Guggenheim Fund for the Promotion of Aeronautics a year later. This fund, totaling $3 million, included an equipment loan for operating the first regularly scheduled commercial airline in the United States. It also provided for the establishment of the first weather reporting exclusively for passenger airplanes.

Guggenheim was inducted into the National Aviation Hall of Fame in 1971 for his service to aviation.

=== Military career ===
In World War I, he was commissioned Lt. J. G., USNRF, and was sent to France. He also served in England and Italy until the Armistice, when he left the Navy with the rank of Lt. Commander. Guggenheim was a lieutenant commander. In World War II, he was recalled to active duty in the Navy and served in the South Pacific as a tail gunner on a torpedo bomber. Guggenheim rose to the rank of captain by the end of the war.

=== Public service ===
Guggenheim was the United States ambassador to Cuba from 1929 until his resignation in 1933. According to his obituary, "much of his time during that period was devoted to prevailing on the Cuban dictator‐president, Gen. Gerardo Machado y Morales, "not to murder too many of his political enemies", as Mr. Guggenheim later put it.

In 1929, President Herbert Hoover appointed Guggenheim to serve on the National Advisory Committee of Aeronautics, a position that he held until 1938. In 1948, as president of the Daniel and Florence Guggenheim Foundation, he continued to support United States aviation progress when he helped organize the Daniel and Florence Guggenheim Jet Propulsion Center at the California Institute of Technology and the Guggenheim Laboratories for Aerospace Propulsion Sciences at Princeton University.

=== Thoroughbred horse racing ===
Guggenheim was a participant in the founding of the New York Racing Association. From 1929, he was a major thoroughbred racehorse owner and breeder. His Cain Hoy Stable raced in the United States and was the owner of numerous successful horses including the 1953 Kentucky Derby winner Dark Star, the only horse ever to defeat the legendary Native Dancer, and Eclipse Award winner Bald Eagle. Also he was the breeder and owner (until his death) of Ack Ack, who is in the Thoroughbred Racing Hall of Fame and was American Horse of the Year in 1971.

=== Newsday ===
Guggenheim, with his third wife, Alicia Patterson, founded the newspaper Newsday in 1940. Guggenheim was president of the company, while his wife was editor and publisher until her death in 1963, then he assumed those duties until 1967. The circulation of Newsday reached 450,000 and received the Pulitzer Prize in 1954.

In 1967, he turned over the publisher position to Bill Moyers and continued as president and editor-in-chief. But Guggenheim was disappointed by the liberal drift of the newspaper under Moyers, criticizing the "left-wing" coverage of Vietnam War protests. The two split over the 1968 presidential election, with Guggenheim signing an editorial supporting Richard Nixon, when Moyers supported Hubert Humphrey. Guggenheim sold his majority share to the then-conservative Times Mirror Company over the attempt of newspaper employees to block the sale, even though Moyers offered $10 million more than the Times-Mirror purchase price; Moyers resigned a few days later. Guggenheim, who died a year later, disinherited Moyers from his will.

== Personal life ==
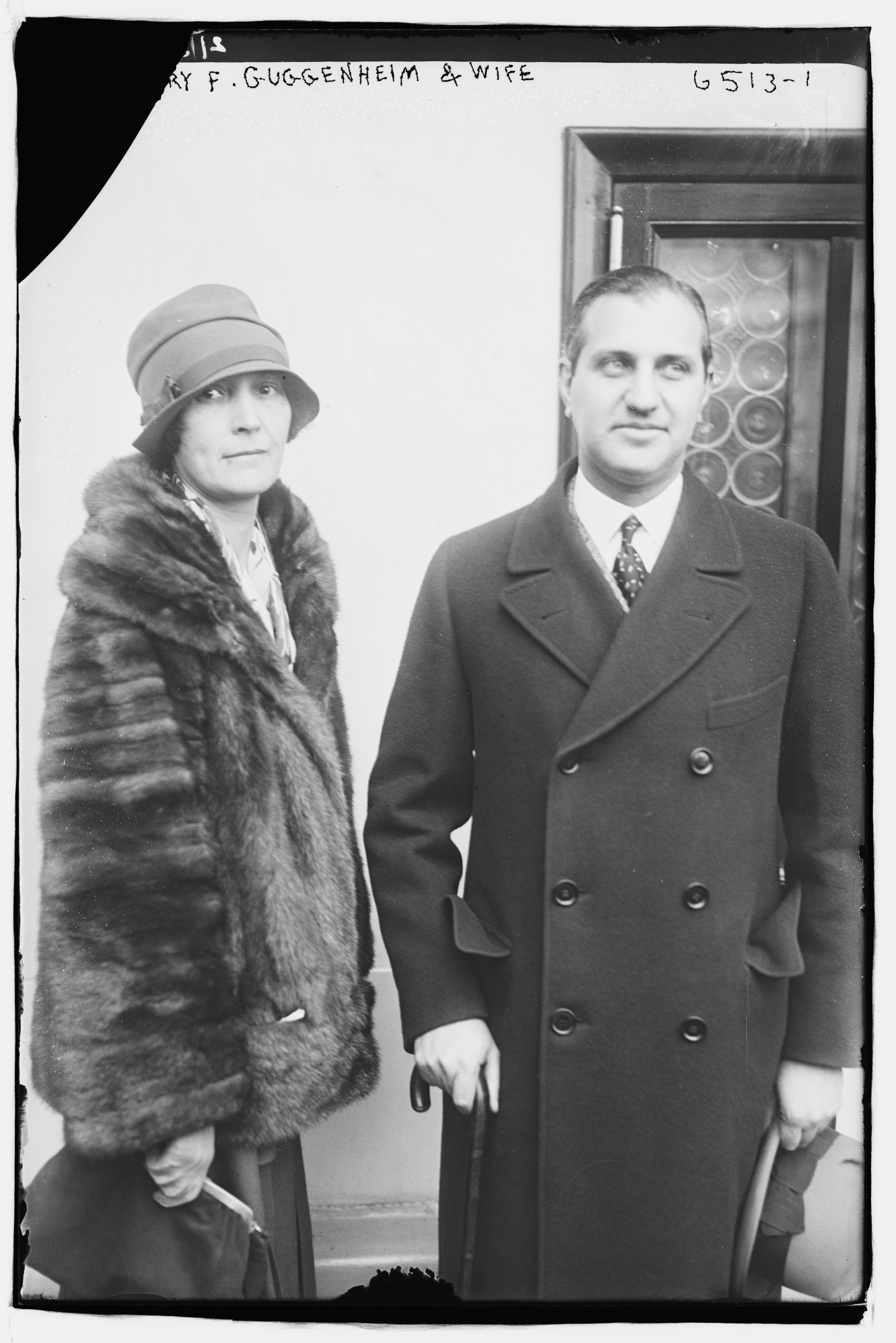
Photograph of Guggenheim and his wife

On November 10, 1910, Guggenheim was married to Helen Rosenberg at the Rosenberg residence on 166 West 78th Street. Helen was a daughter of Herman Rosenberg. Before their divorce in 1923, they were the parents of two daughters:

- Joan Guggenheim (1912–2001), a captain in the Women's Auxiliary Air Force who served in the Pacific in World War II. She married Albert Van de Maele.
- Nancy Guggenheim (1916–1973), an author and ballet teacher who first married George T. Draper, a grandson of Charles A. Dana. She later married lawyer Thomas J. Williams.

His second marriage was on February 3, 1923, to Caroline (née Morton) Potter (1882–1952), a daughter of Paul Morton, the former vice president of the Santa Fe Railroad who served as Secretary of the Navy under President Theodore Roosevelt. Caroline, the former wife of William Chapman Potter (president of the Guaranty Trust Co. who had done business with Guggenheim in 1920), was also the niece of Joy Morton, founder of Morton Salt, and a granddaughter of Julius Sterling Morton, who had served as Secretary of Agriculture under President Grover Cleveland. Before their divorce in July 1939, they were the parents of one daughter:

- Diane Guggenheim (1924–1991), who married four times; first to singer John Meredith Langstaff, then Robert Guillard, followed by the Irish journalist William Meek, and, lastly, to John Darby Stolt.

On July 1, 1939, Guggenheim married for the third time to Alicia (née Patterson) Brooks (1906–1963) in Jacksonville, Florida. Alicia, the former wife of U.S. Representative James Simpson Jr. and football coach Joseph W. Brooks, was a daughter of Joseph Medill Patterson (founder of the New York Daily News) and sister of James Joseph Patterson.

Guggenheim died of cancer on January 22, 1971, at "Falaise", his home at Sands Point on Long Island, New York. He was buried in Salem Fields Cemetery in Brooklyn, New York.

Diplomatic posts
Preceded by Noble Brandon Judah	United States Ambassador to Cuba; 1929–1933	Succeeded by Sumner Welles
