= Diane Schulder Abrams =

American attorney, feminist, and author

- Education: Columbia University Columbia Law School (JD)
- Spouse: Robert Abrams
- Children: 2

Diane Schulder Abrams (née Schulder; born 1937) is an American attorney, feminist, and author.

== Early life and education ==
Diane B. Schulder was born in Brooklyn, New York in 1937. She was raised in a Jewish family, the daughter of Jacob Schulder, who became CEO of the Gibralter Corporation of America, and Hilda Schulder. Schulder was raised on Long Island. She graduated from Columbia University and Columbia Law School.

== Career ==
Schulder clerked for United States district judge Dudley B. Bonsal after law school in the Southern District of New York. She practiced law for two years with the Legal Aid Society of Manhattan. She practiced women's matrimonial law and worked on the first case to challenge a state law restricting abortion. Later, she worked at Brown Harris Stevens, practicing real estate law in Manhattan.

Schulder is credited with founding the first law school course on women and the law in 1969 at the University of Pennsylvania and later at New York University School of Law.

== Books ==
- Abortion Rap by Diane Schulder and Florynce Kennedy (McGraw-Hill, 1971) ISBN 978-0-07-055713-0
- My Grandmother's Candlesticks: Judaism & Feminism A Multigenerational Memoir by Diane Schulder Abrams (Ktav, 2024) ISBN 978-1-60280-528-6

== Personal life ==
Schulder married Robert Abrams, then the Bronx Burough President, on September 15, 1974. The couple has two children, Rachel and Becky, and eight grandchildren. Schulder gave birth to Becky at the age of 49, which she attributes to a blessing received from the Lubavitcher Rebbe.
