= Herbert G. Squiers =

American diplomat and soldier

Herbert Goldsmith Squiers
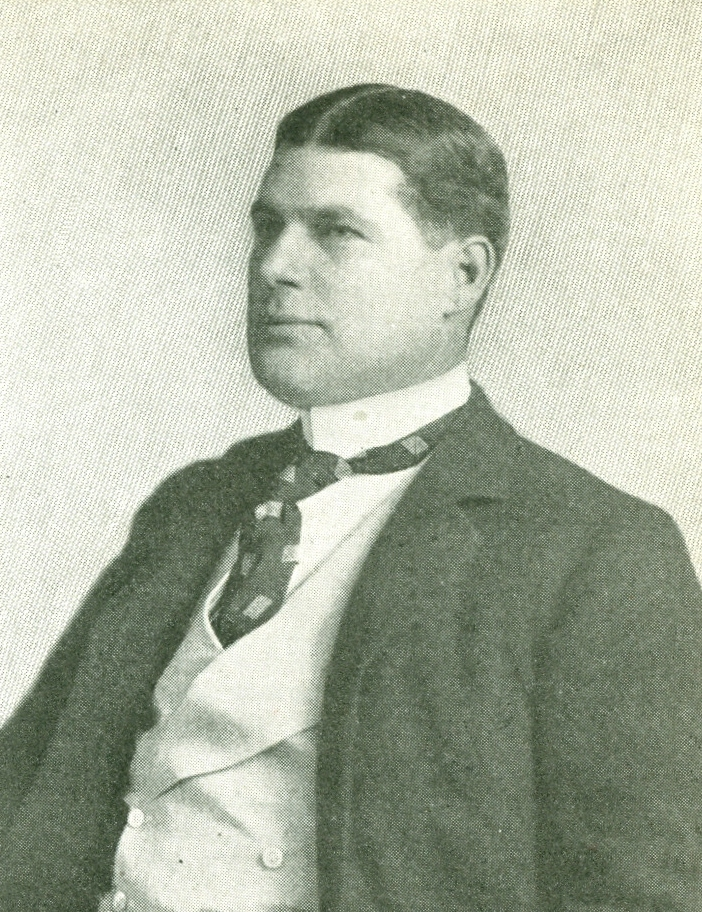

4th United States Minister to Panama
- In office November 8, 1906 – August 3, 1909
- President: Theodore Roosevelt
- Preceded by: Charles E. Magoon
- Succeeded by: R. S. Reynolds Hitt

1st United States Minister to Cuba
- In office May 27, 1902 – December 2, 1905
- President: Theodore Roosevelt
- Preceded by: Diplomatic relations established
- Succeeded by: Edwin V. Morgan

Personal details
- Born: April 20, 1859 Madoc, Canada West
- Died: October 19, 1911 (aged 52)
- Spouse(s): Helen Lacy Fargo; Harriet Bard Woodcock
- Children: 6
- Education: Maryland Agricultural College
- Profession: Diplomat, soldier

Military service
- Allegiance: United States
- Branch/service: United States Army
- Years of service: 1877-1891
- Rank: First Lieutenant
- Unit: 1st Infantry Regiment; 7th Cavalry Regiment
- Battles/wars: Indian Wars

Herbert Goldsmith Squiers (April 20, 1859 – October 19, 1911) was an American diplomat and soldier, who served as the U.S. minister to Cuba (1902–1905), and Panama (1906–1909) and a Second Lieutenant in the United States Army.

== Early life ==
Squires was born April 20, 1859 in Madoc, Canada West, but his parents moved to the United States while he was young. He attended school in both Minnesota and Maryland before attending the Maryland Agricultural College.

== Career ==
Squiers joined the Army in 1877 and was commissioned as a Second Lieutenant and attended the United States Artillery School. In 1880 he was transferred from the First Infantry Regiment to the U.S. 7th Cavalry Regiment.

In October 1885, while still a member of the U.S. 7th Cavalry Regiment, he reported for duty at St. John's College (now known as Fordham University) in New York, as the school's first Professor of Military Science and Tactics. He trained and outfitted an impressive Corps of Cadets, the predecessor of today's Army ROTC program at Fordham. In December 1890, he left the college and returned to the U.S. 7th Cavalry Regiment on detached service at Fort Leavenworth to appear before a board for promotion to First Lieutenant. He returned to the regiment 4 January 1891, about a week after the Battle of Wounded Knee. Troop K took heavy losses during the battle and Captain Wallace (a survivor of the Little Big Horn) and five troopers were killed and 10 wounded. Squiers took command of Troop K but shortly thereafter he resigned and left the Army early in 1891.

=== Diplomatic service ===
He entered U.S. diplomatic service and first served as Second Secretary of the American Embassy in Berlin in 1894. He retired in 1897, then was appointed secretary of the American Legation in Beijing (Peking) in 1898. He was appointed as Minister to Cuba in May, 1902 and served until November 1905. There was growing opposition to his policies as Minister, including his support for a group of U.S. citizens encamped in the Isle of Pines who sought to organize a territorial government leading to the annexation of Cuba to the U.S. He resigned under pressure. From 1906 until 1909 he served as Minister to Panama.

=== Looting controversy ===
Squiers was a noted collector of fine porcelain, and had previously collected porcelain during vacations in Japan. While serving as the First Secretary of the American Legation in Beijing, he added to this collection. Diana Preston described Squiers and his wife:

These stylish and well-connected New England 'blue noses' had excellent taste and an acquisitive streak to match. During their stay in China they amassed such an extensive collection of antique Chinese porcelain that when they eventually left Peking it filled several railroad carriages. Several newspapers unsympathetically described it as 'loot'.

Much of Squiers' collection was acquired for him by William N. Pethick (died 1901), the private secretary and diplomatic advisor to leading Qing statesman Li Hongzhang (Li Hung-chang) (1823–1901). British High Commissioner to China Sir Ernest Mason Satow (1843–1929), in speculating as to the sources of The Times correspondent George Ernest Morrison's accurate information, theorises that Squiers was the "leak":

I strongly suspect leakage thro' the Secy. of the US legn., Squiers, who buys curios with the aid of Pethick, the well-know[n] hanger-on of Li Hung chang & who gets political information fr[om] S. in return for expert advice as to the merits of cloisonne, porcelain & lacquer.

Squiers was accused of purchasing a confiscated collection of porcelain from Pierre-Marie-Alphonse Favier (1837–1905), Vicar Apostolic of North Chihli province of the Roman Catholic Church, and the pastor of the congregation where Squiers was a member. In the aftermath of the Boxer Rebellion, Jasper Whiting, War Correspondent for the Westminster Gazette, wrote that "the best collection of loot obtained belonged to Lady MacDonald, the wife of the British minister, while the second-best belonged to the First Secretary of the American Legation." Investigative journalist Sterling Seagrave asserts that "great fortunes were made by those like Herbert Squiers, who knew where to find the richest pickings and chose his loot as a connoisseur." Squiers told the correspondent for The Times, Australian George Ernest Morrison (1862–1920), that he was concerned about the attacks on him by Stephen Bonsal in The New York Herald, concerning "the looting done by an American diplomatist in Peking." Morrison indicated that a souvenir which he described as "the finest piece of jade in Peking" came into his possession and he sold it to Herbert Squiers for 2,000 taels. On 7 March 1901, the United States Minister to China, Edwin Hurd Conger (1843–1907), sent a cable to John Hay, the United States Secretary of State, that exonerated Squiers completely of looting: "the reports that have reached America to the effect that H.G. Squiers, the United States Secretary of Legation, had been guilty of looting were based on misinformation. As a matter of fact, the Minister states, Mr. Squiers is entirely guiltless of any such thing."

Squiers left Beijing on 2 September 1901 "with what was reported to be several railway cars filled with Chinese art," which Squiers indicated was to be donated to the Metropolitan Museum of Art in New York City. Among those critical of the origins of Squiers' donation to the Metropolitan Museum were New Outlook magazine, which claimed the "collection of fine Chinese porcelain [was] known to have been looted from palaces in Peking," and Life magazine: "The coyness of the Metropolitan Museum's attitude towards looted treasures of Chinese art affords matter for contemplation." In response to criticism that this collection was the result of looting, both the New York Metropolitan Museum of Art and the U.S. State department officials were skeptical of accusations that this was a large collection of loot. His collection was on loan to the United States National Museum (better known as The Smithsonian Institution) in Washington D.C. from 1907 to 1908. After his death, his collection was sold at auction in New York in April 1912, and realised over $48,000. The method of which Squiers used to acquire his collection of Chinese art continued to be criticized as lately as 2003, with journalist Sandy English writing that "much of the Squires [sic.] Collection of Chinese art, now in the Metropolitan Museum in New York, was stolen from Beijing in the aftermath of the revolt".

== Personal life ==
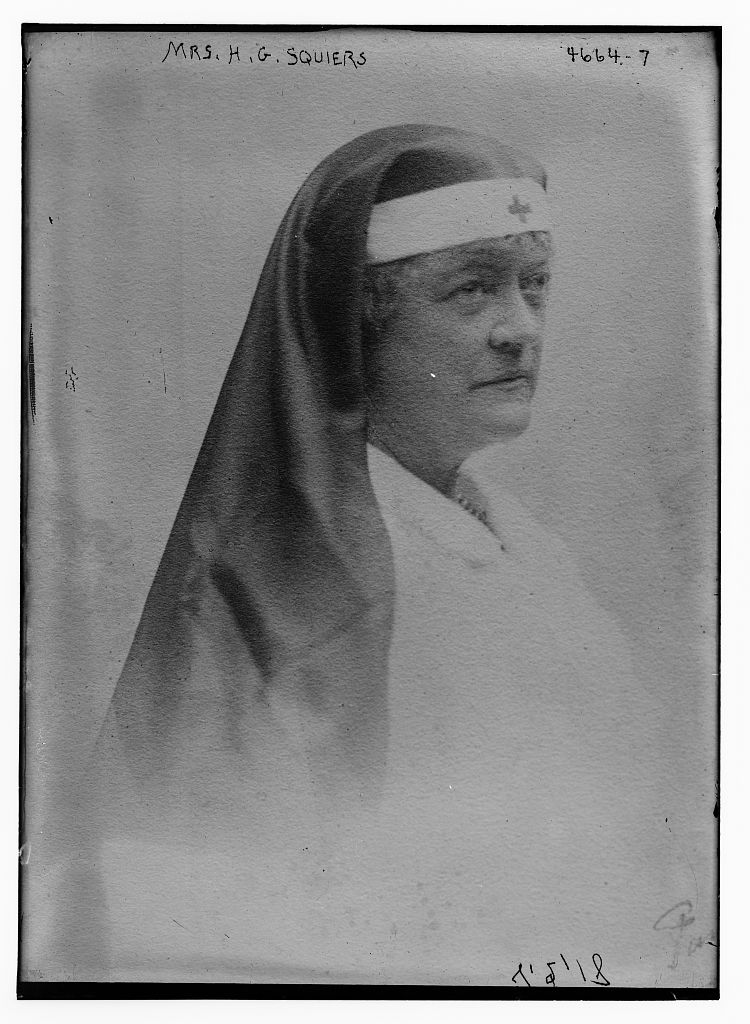
Harriet Bard Woodcock (1866–1935) in 1918

On October 11, 1881, he married Helen Lacy Fargo (1857–1886), daughter of the late William G. Fargo, co-founder of Wells Fargo & Company. She died in 1886 leaving Squiers with four children:

- Gladys Squiers (1882–1974), who married Rear Adm. Harry H. Rousseau.
- William G. Squiers (1883–1904)
- Georgia Squiers (1884–1942), who married Harold Cutler Whitman (1883–1966)
- Helen Fargo Squiers (1886–1966), who married William Astor Drayton (1888–1973), grandson of William Backhouse Astor, Jr. (1829–1892)

On November 14, 1892, Squiers married his second wife, Harriette Bard Woodcock (1866–1935), with whom he had two additional children:

- Herbert G. Squiers, Jr. (1892–1941)
- Bard MacDonald Squiers (1893–1934)

Squiers died October 19, 1911. His widow, the former Harriet "Hattie" Woodcock, said after his death that "political intrigues" had "Prevented him from attaining the diplomatic and political prominence that was his due."

Diplomatic posts
Preceded by None	United States Minister to Cuba; May 27, 1902–December 2, 1905	Succeeded by Edwin V. Morgan
Preceded by Charles E. Magoon	United States Minister to Panama; November 8, 1906–August 3, 1909	Succeeded by R. S. Reynolds Hitt
