= List of ambassadors of the United States to Cuba =

Ambassadors of the United States to Cuba

Ambassador of the United States to Cuba
- Seal of the United States Department of State

- Flag of a United States ambassador
- Status: Vacant
- Nominator: The president of the United States
- Appointer: The president with Senate advice and consent
- Inaugural holder: Herbert G. Squiers as Envoy Extraordinary and Minister Plenipotentiary
- Formation: May 20, 1902; reestablished July 20, 2015
- Final holder: Philip Bonsal (1960)
- Abolished: January 3, 1961 – July 20, 2015
- Website: U.S. Embassy - Havana

The United States ambassador to the Republic of Cuba is the official representative of the president of the United States to the head of state of Cuba, and serves as the head of the Embassy of the United States in Havana. Direct bilateral diplomatic relations did not exist between the two countries from 1961 to 2015. President Dwight D. Eisenhower severed relations following the Cuban Revolution on January 3, 1961. Relations were subsequently restored by Cuban President Raúl Castro and President Barack Obama on July 20, 2015.

With the restoration of relations in 2015, the president may nominate an ambassador, though the position has remained vacant since 1960. The embassy has been overseen by chargé d'affaires Mike Hammer since 2024 on an ad interim basis. The chargé d'affaires and the embassy staff at large work in the American Embassy on the Malecón in Havana.

== History ==
Cuba was the last major Spanish colony to gain independence, following a lengthy struggle that began in 1868. José Martí, Cuba's national hero, helped initiate the final push for independence in 1895. In 1898, the United States fought a brief war known as the Spanish–American War, after the USS Maine sank in Havana Harbor on February 15, 1898, due to an explosion of undetermined origin. In December 1898, Spain relinquished control of Cuba to the United States with the Treaty of Paris. On May 20, 1902, the United States granted Cuba its independence but retained the right to intervene to preserve Cuban independence and stability in accordance with the Platt Amendment. Prior to 1902, American interests in Cuba were represented by a Consul-General at Havana.

In 1902 the US established an embassy in Havana and appointed its first ambassador, Herbert G. Squiers. In 1934, the Platt Amendment was repealed. The United States and Cuba concluded a Treaty of Relations in 1934 which, among other things, continued the 1903 agreements that leased the Guantanamo Bay Naval Base to the United States. In 1959 Fidel Castro's 26th of July Movement overthrew the government of Fulgencio Batista and Batista fled the country on January 1, 1959. Relations between the United States and Cuba deteriorated rapidly as the Cuban government expropriated US properties and developed close ties with the Soviet Union. In October 1960, the US recalled its ambassador to protest Castro's policies. On January 3, 1961, the US withdrew diplomatic recognition of the Cuban government and closed the embassy in Havana. On September 1, 1977, the US established the United States Interests Section in Havana, located in its former embassy and operated under the auspices of the Embassy of Switzerland in Havana. The Interests Section was headed by Chief of Mission rather than an ambassador. Bilateral relations between the two governments resumed on July 20, 2015.

== Consuls General at Havana ==
- William Shaler (1829–1833)
- Nicholas Trist (1833–1841)
- James S. Calhoun (1841–1842)
- Robert B. Campbell (1842–1850)
- Allen F. Owen (1851–1851)
- William L. Sharkey (1851–1853)
- Alexander M. Clayton (1853–1854)
- Roger Barton (1854–1856)
- Andrew K. Blythe (1856–1858)
- Charles J. Helm (1858–1861)
- Robert Wilson Shufeldt (1861–1863)
- William T. Minor (1864–1867)
- Henry C. Hall (1873–1877)
- Adam Badeau (1882–1884)
- Ramon O. Williams (1884–1896)
- Fitzhugh Lee (1896–1898)
- J. Frank Aldrich (appointed 1897 but never took office)
- Edward S. Bragg (1902–1902)

== Ambassadors ==
Name (Note: The ambassador held the title "Envoy Extraordinary and Minister Plenipotentiary" before 1921 and "Ambassador Extraordinary and Plenipotentiary" afterwards.)	Appointed	Presented credentials	Terminated mission	Notes
Herbert G. Squiers	May 20, 1902	May 27, 1902	December 2, 1905	
Edwin V. Morgan	November 29, 1905	March 1, 1906 (Note: Morgan was commissioned during a recess of the Senate and recommissioned after confirmation on December 11, 1905.)	January 5, 1910	
John Brinkerhoff Jackson	December 21, 1909	March 22, 1910	October 27, 1911	Recalled
Arthur M. Beaupre	August 12, 1911	December 18, 1911	June 28, 1913	
William E. Gonzales	June 21, 1913	August 9, 1913	December 18, 1919	Political appointee
Boaz W. Long	June 30, 1919	January 8, 1920	June 17, 1921	Political appointee
Enoch H. Crowder	February 10, 1923	March 5, 1923	May 28, 1927	Political appointee
Noble Brandon Judah	November 22, 1927	December 17, 1927 (Note: Judah was commissioned during a recess of the Senate and recommissioned after confirmation on December 17, 1927.)	June 1, 1929	Political appointee
Harry F. Guggenheim	October 10, 1929	November 21, 1929	April 2, 1933	Political appointee
Sumner Welles	April 24, 1933	May 11, 1933	December 13, 1933 (Note: Normal relations were interrupted on September 5, 1933; the new Government of Cuba was still unrecognized by the United States when Welles left post on December 13, 1933.)	Career FSO.
Jefferson Caffery	February 23, 1934	February 28, 1934	March 9, 1937	Career FSO
J. Butler Wright	July 13, 1937	August 23, 1937	December 4, 1939	Career FSO. Died at post.
George S. Messersmith	January 12, 1940	March 8, 1940	February 8, 1942	Career FSO. Recalled.
Spruille Braden	December 20, 1941	May 19, 1942	April 27, 1945	Political appointee
Raymond Henry Norweb	May 21, 1945	July 24, 1945	May 22, 1948	Career FSO
Robert Butler	May 22, 1948	June 8, 1948	February 10, 1951	Political appointee
Willard L. Beaulac	June 20, 1951	September 20, 1951	August 9, 1953	Career FSO
Arthur Gardner	May 28, 1953	October 16, 1953	June 16, 1957	Political appointee
Earl E. T. Smith	June 3, 1957	July 23, 1957	January 19, 1959	Political appointee
Philip W. Bonsal	February 16, 1959	March 3, 1959	October 28, 1960 (Note: Daniel M. Braddock was serving as Chargé d'affaires ad interim when the United States severed diplomatic relations with Cuba in January 1961.)	Career FSO.

Normal relations were severed in January 1961 and were not re-established until July 2015. An ambassador to Cuba has not been appointed since the re-establishment of diplomatic relations. All the following served Chargé d'affaires ad interim.

- Jeffrey DeLaurentis from July 20, 2015, to July 7, 2017
- Scott Hamilton from July 7 to October 26, 2017
- Lawrence J. Gumbiner from October 26, 2017, to February 11, 2018
- Philip Goldberg from February 11 to July 20, 2018
- Mara Tekach from July 20, 2018 to July 21, 2020
- Timothy Zúñiga-Brown from July 31, 2020, to July 14, 2022
- Benjamin G. Ziff from July 14, 2022 to November 14, 2024
- Mike Hammer from November 14, 2024

== Chiefs of the U.S. Interests Section ==
The Interests Section operated from September 1, 1977, to July 20, 2015.

- 1977–1979: Lyle Franklin Lane
- 1979–1982: Wayne S. Smith
- 1982–1985: John Ferch
- 1985–1987: Curtis W. Kamman
- 1987–1990: John J. Taylor
- 1990–1993: Alan H. Flanigan
- 1993–1996: Joseph Sullivan
- 1996–1999: Michael Kozak
- 1999–2002: Vicki Huddleston
- 2002–2005: James Cason
- 2005–2008: Michael E. Parmly
- 2008–2010: Jonathan D. Farrar
- 2010–2011: Vacant
- September 2011 – 2014: John Caulfield
- August 2014 – July 20, 2015: Jeffrey DeLaurentis

== See also ==
- Cuba–United States relations
- Foreign relations of Cuba
- Ambassadors of the United States
