= Edwin Vernon Morgan =

American diplomat (1865–1934)

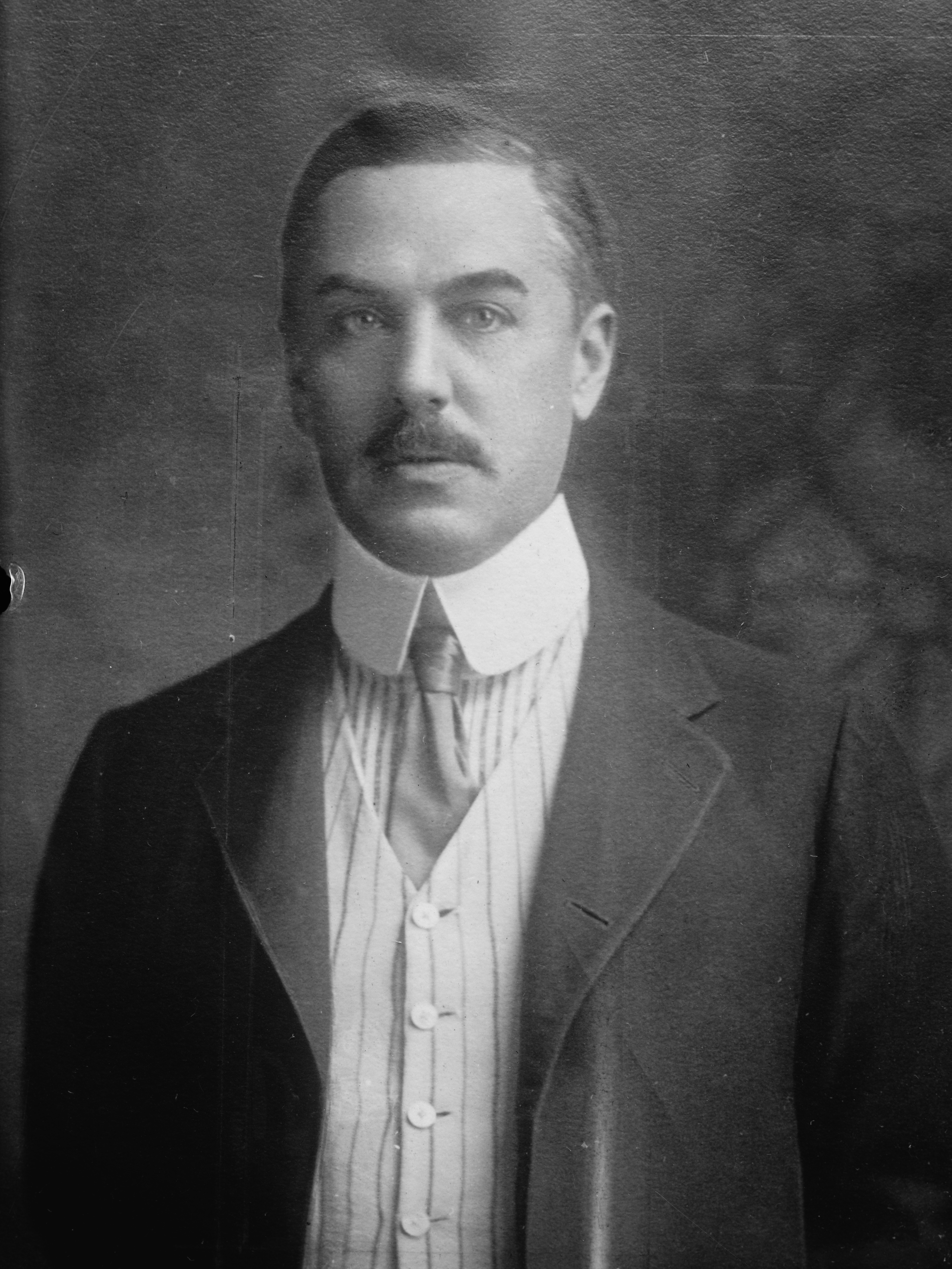

United States Ambassador to Brazil
- In office June 4, 1912 – August 23, 1933
- President: William Howard Taft; Woodrow Wilson; Warren G. Harding; Calvin Coolidge; Herbert Hoover; Franklin D. Roosevelt
- Preceded by: Irving Bedell Dudley
- Succeeded by: Hugh S. Gibson

United States Minister to Portugal
- In office August 3, 1911 – February 11, 1912
- President: William Howard Taft
- Preceded by: Henry Gage
- Succeeded by: Cyrus Woods

United States Minister to Paraguay
- In office June 29, 1910 – July 8, 1911
- President: William Howard Taft
- Preceded by: Edward C. O'Brien
- Succeeded by: Nicolai A. Grevstad

United States Minister to Uruguay
- In office March 31, 1910 – July 8, 1911
- President: William Howard Taft
- Preceded by: Edward C. O'Brien
- Succeeded by: Nicolai A. Grevstad

United States Minister to Cuba
- In office March 1, 1906 – January 5, 1910
- President: Theodore Roosevelt; William Howard Taft
- Preceded by: Herbert G. Squiers
- Succeeded by: John Brinkerhoff Jackson

3rd United States Minister to Korea
- In office June 26, 1905 – November 17, 1905
- President: Theodore Roosevelt
- Preceded by: Horace Newton Allen
- Succeeded by: Diplomatic relations ended

Personal details
- Born: February 22, 1865 Aurora, Cayuga County, New York, US
- Died: April 16, 1934 (aged 69) Petrópolis, Brazil
- Resting place: Cemitério Municipal de Petrópolis, Petrópolis, Brazil; 22.5090°S 43.1888°W
- Relatives: Edwin B. Morgan, grandfather
- Education: Harvard University
- Profession: Diplomat
- Awards: Order of the Southern Cross

Edwin Vernon Morgan (February 22, 1865 – April 16, 1934) was an American diplomat. He served as United States Ambassador to Brazil, and served as Minister to Cuba, Paraguay, Uruguay, Portugal, and Korea.

== Early life and education ==
Morgan was born on February 22, 1886 in Aurora, New York, the son of Margeret (née Bogart) and Henry A. Morgan, and the grandson of Congressman Edwin Barber Morgan. He attended Phillips Academy, and then Harvard University, earning a bachelor's degree in 1890, and a master's degree in 1891. He continued his post-graduate studies at the University of Berlin.

Morgan returned to Harvard, where he taught history for two years. Then, from 1895-1898, he taught at Adelbert College in Cleveland, Ohio.

Morgan next entered the United States Foreign Service, beginning his diplomatic career in 1899 as secretary to the Samoan High Commissioner.

== Diplomatic career ==
Morgan's diplomatic service commenced in 1899 when he was appointed as secretary to the U.S. High Commissioner in Samoa. He later served as secretary to the U.S. Legation in Korea from 1899 to 1900. His tenure in Korea continued as he was appointed Envoy Extraordinary and Minister Plenipotentiary in 1905, presenting his credentials on June 26, 1905. However, following Japan's assumption of control over Korean foreign relations in November 1905, Morgan closed the U.S. Legation and departed Korea in December 1905.

In 1906, Morgan was appointed Minister to Cuba, presenting his credentials on March 1, 1906. He served in this capacity until January 5, 1910. Subsequently, he was concurrently appointed Minister to Uruguay and Paraguay in December 1909, presenting his credentials to both nations on March 31 and June 29, 1910, respectively. He remained in these posts until July 8, 1911, residing in Montevideo.

Morgan's diplomatic assignments continued with his appointment as Minister to Portugal in May 1911, presenting his credentials on August 3, 1911, and serving until February 11, 1912.

In 1912, Morgan was appointed by President William Howard Taft as Ambassador Extraordinary and Plenipotentiary to Brazil. He held this post until his retirement in 1933, making him one of the longest-serving American diplomats in that country. During his tenure, Morgan developed a detailed understanding of Brazilian society, literature, and political affairs, and was noted for his engagement with various aspects of national life. His extensive experience in Brazil contributed to his reputation as a well-informed observer of the country's cultural and social dynamics.

Morgan advocated for improved transportation and communication links between the United States and South America, particularly emphasizing the importance of more efficient mail and passenger services between the two regions. He viewed these improvements as essential to strengthening diplomatic and commercial relations. During his time in Brazil, he was also involved in the negotiation of trade arrangements, including agreements related to coffee and wheat exchanges between the two countries.

After 21 years, Morgan retired on August 23, 1933. In recognition of his diplomatic service and long-standing presence in Brazil, Morgan was awarded the Order of the Southern Cross by the Brazilian government in 1933.

== Retirement and death ==
In 1933, Morgan retired to Petropolis, Brazil. He died at home on April 16, 1934, aged 69. Morgan was buried at Cemitério Municipal de Petrópolis in Brazil.

Diplomatic posts
Preceded by Irving Bedell Dudley	United States Ambassador to Brazil; 1912–1933	Succeeded by Hugh S. Gibson
