= R. S. Reynolds Hitt =

American diplomat

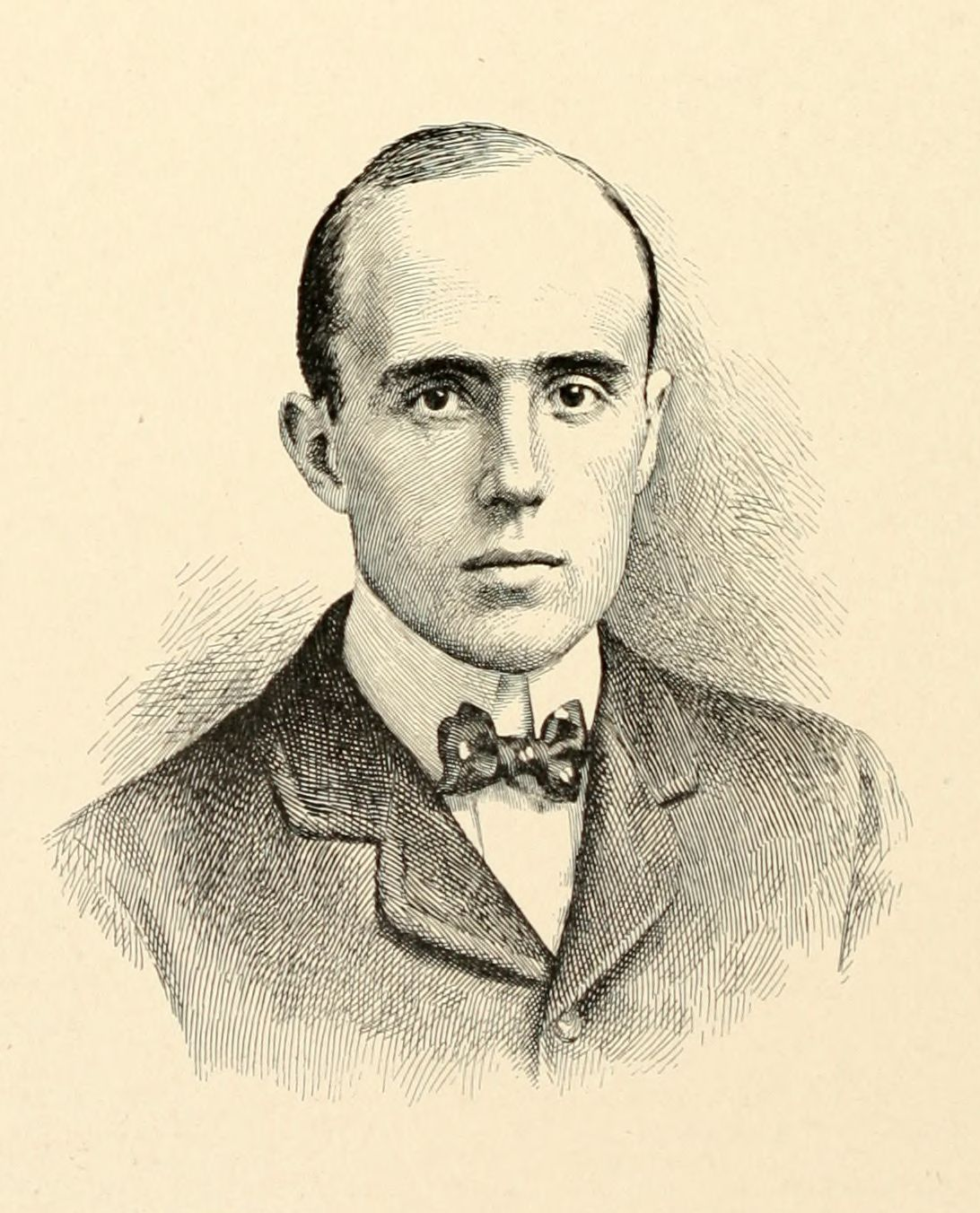
- Hitt as found in The National Cyclopaedia of American Biography, 1910

U.S. Minister to Guatemala
- In office October 14, 1910 – March 4, 1913
- Preceded by: William Franklin Sands
- Succeeded by: William Hayne Leavell

U.S. Minister to Panama
- In office March 26, 1910 – July 19, 1910
- Preceded by: Herbert G. Squiers
- Succeeded by: Thomas C. Dawson

Personal details
- Born: June 7, 1876 Paris, France
- Died: April 16, 1938 (aged 61) Washington, D.C.
- Spouse: Edith Romeyn Gray (m. 1902)
- Children: Robert Reynolds Hitt; Sally Reynolds Hitt
- Parent: Robert R. Hitt
- Education: Yale University; Harvard Law School

Robert Stockwell Reynolds Hitt (June 7, 1876 – April 16, 1938) was an American diplomat.

== Early life ==
Hitt was born on June 7, 1876, in Paris, France where his father was stationed after being appointed by President Ulysses S. Grant as First Secretary of the American Legation there. His father was Robert R. Hitt, a close friend of Abraham Lincoln who was also a U.S. Representative and the former United States Assistant Secretary of State under Presidents James A. Garfield and Chester A. Arthur. His mother was Sarah Anne "Sally" Reynolds (1843–1949), one of the Washington's leading socialites, and his younger brother was William Floyd Reynolds Hitt (who married Katherine Elkins, who was famous for her relationship with Prince Luigi Amedeo, Duke of the Abruzzi, and after Katherine's death, Eugenia Woodward).

His paternal grandfather was the Rev. Thomas Smith Hitt of Kentucky and his maternal grandparents were Elizabeth (née Stockwell) Reynolds and William Floyd Reynolds, president of the Indianapolis, Cincinnati and Lafayette Railroad.

Hitt attended Yale University, where he received his A.B. degree in 1898, and Harvard Law School, from where he graduated in 1901.

== Career ==
After his graduation from Harvard Law, he immediately joined the diplomatic service, serving successively as Third Secretary of the Embassy at Paris from 1901 to 1902, Second Secretary at Embassy at Berlin from 1902 to 1905, Secretary at the Embassy at Rome from 1905 to 1908, followed by Secretary at Embassy at Berlin from 1908 to 1910.

On December 21, 1909, he was named by President William Howard Taft as the Envoy Extraordinary and Minister Plenipotentiary of the United States to Panama. He presented his credentials to President Carlos Antonio Mendoza on March 29, 1910, serving until he presented his recall on July 19, 1910. On June 24, 1910, he was appointed as Envoy Extraordinary and Minister Plenipotentiary of the United States to Venezuela. Although he took the oath of office, he did not proceed to his post (which was not filled until the appointment of John W. Garrett in March 1911), instead, President Taft appointed him as the Envoy Extraordinary and Minister Plenipotentiary of the United States to Guatemala on September 17, 1910. Hitt was commissioned during a recess of the Senate before being recommissioned on December 15, 1910, after confirmation. He had presented his credentials on October 14, 1910, and served until he left his post on March 3, 1913, following the inauguration of Woodrow Wilson after which Hitt retired from the diplomatic service.

== Personal life ==
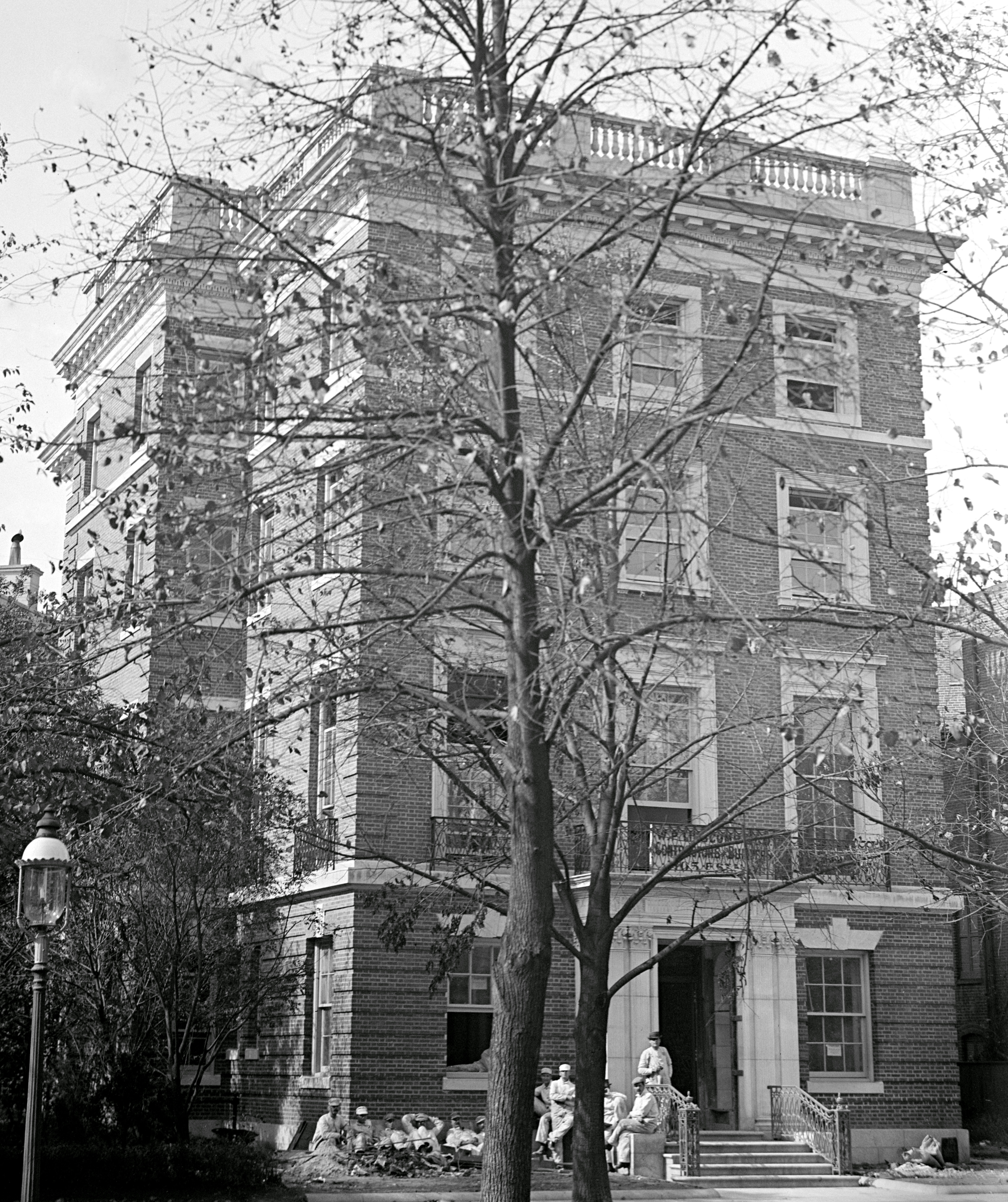
Hitt's residence, 1520 18th Street, NW.

On December 23, 1902, Hitt was married to Edith Romeyn Gray (1880–1964) at St. Bartholomew's Church in Manhattan. Edith was a daughter of Judge John Clinton Gray. Together, they were the parents of:

- Elizabeth Hitt (1905–1953), who married Andor de Hertelendy, then Secretary of the Legation of Hungary, in 1927 with Count László Széchenyi as best man.
- Robert Reynolds Hitt (1907–1984), who married Evelyn Bigelow Clark, a daughter of New York banker James Francis A. Clark and Edith Evelyn (née Bigelow) Clark, in 1932. After having one child, they divorced in 1943 and she remarried to Winthrop Stuyvesant Emmet (son of C. Temple Emmet).

The Hitt's hired French architect Jules Henri de Sibour to design their home at 1520 18th Street NW in the Dupont Circle neighborhood of Washington, D.C. Construction of the 40-room, five-story home was completed in 1914 at a cost of $77,000. It has served as the Washington location of the Hong Kong Economic and Trade Office since the 1990s and was the residence of Ogden L. Mills (while he was the Undersecretary of the Treasury), Dwight F. Davis (while he was U.S. Secretary of War), Walter Evans Edge (while he was in the U.S. Senate), and Bernard Baruch (while he was an adviser to Franklin D. Roosevelt).

Hitt died on at 2244 S Street, his home in Washington, D.C. (which today is the Irish Ambassadors residence), in April 1938. His widow died in Washington in September 1964.

=== Descendants ===
Through his daughter, he was a grandfather of Emery Hertelendy and Paul Hertelendy, and through his son, Robert, he was a grandfather of Diana Bigelow Hitt, who married Henry Simmons Romaine, a grandson of President of the New York Stock Exchange Edward H. H. Simmons, in 1957, and Jeffrey Potter, son of writer Fuller Potter and grandson of the Rev. Dr. Eliphalet Nott Potter, in 1963.
