= David Pressman =

Former American ambassador to Hungary (born 1977)

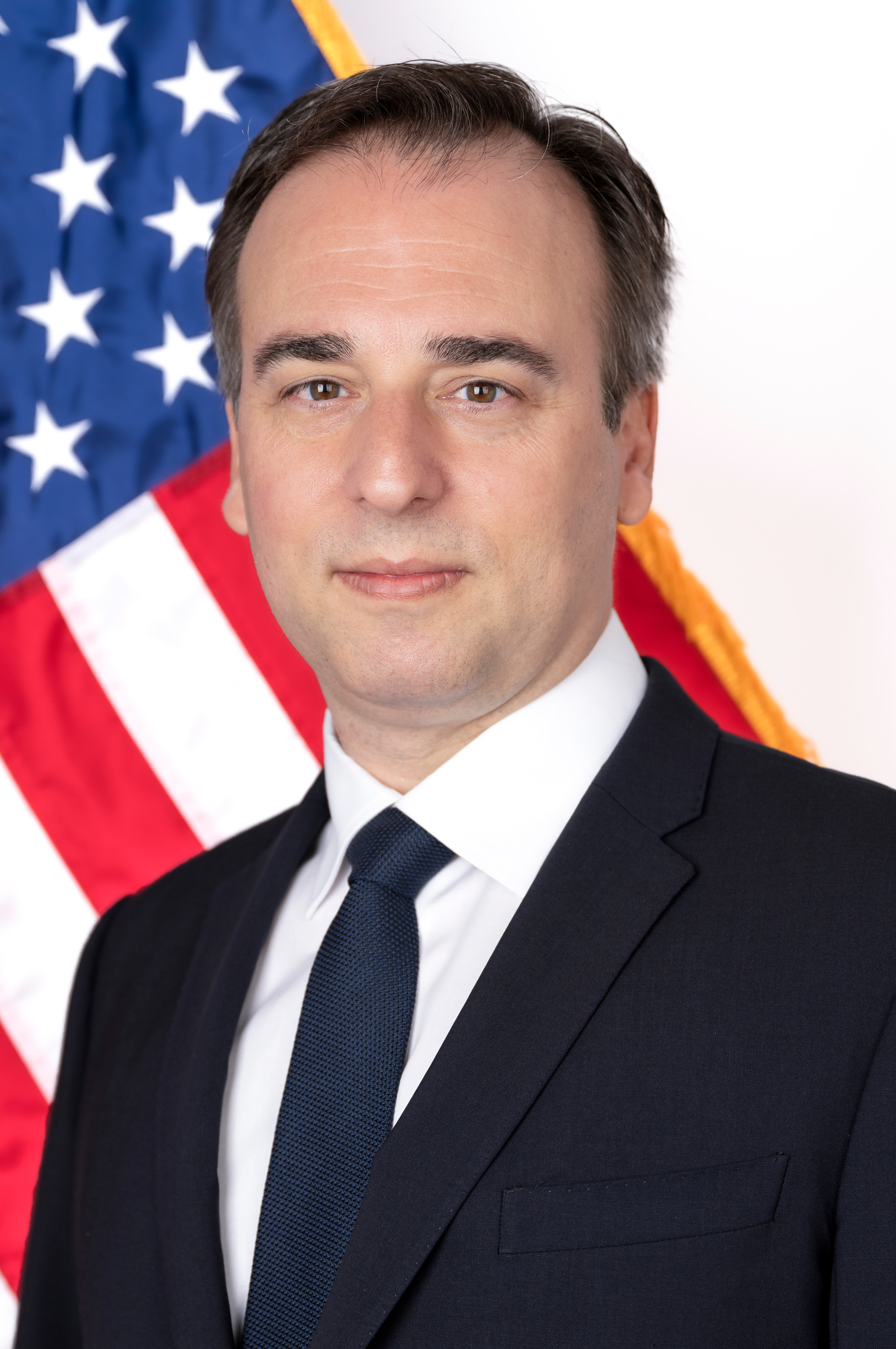

United States Ambassador to Hungary
- In office September 14, 2022 – January 13, 2025
- President: Joe Biden
- Preceded by: B. Bix Aliu (Chargé d'Affaires)
- Succeeded by: David Holmes (Chargé d'Affaires)

United States Ambassador to the United Nations for Special Political Affairs
- In office September 17, 2014 – January 20, 2017
- President: Barack Obama
- Preceded by: Jeffrey DeLaurentis
- Succeeded by: Robert A. Wood

Personal details
- Born: 1977 (age 48–49)
- Spouse: Daniel Basila
- Education: Brown University (BA); New York University (JD)

David Pressman (b. 1977) is an American diplomat and lawyer who served as the United States ambassador to Hungary from 2022 to 2025. He previously served as the United States ambassador to the United Nations for Special Political Affairs and represented the United States at the United Nations Security Council from 2014 to 2016. Pressman has been described by The Guardian as a "high profile diplomat" and by CNN "one of the world's leading human rights advocates".

As an attorney in private practice, Pressman has represented a wide variety of businesses while also representing the interests of human rights advocates, victims of terrorism, dissidents and journalists targeted by authoritarian regimes, and those unjustly convicted.

Pressman was the first openly gay man to serve as the United States ambassador to Hungary and the first LGBT American to be confirmed twice by the United States Senate to serve as an ambassador of the United States.

== Early and personal life ==
David Pressman was born in 1977 and grew up in California. His parents were both lawyers, one of them a judge. His family is Jewish, with roots in Eastern Europe, and while Pressman describes himself as "a proud Jew," he has also said he is "not a particularly religious person." Pressman received his Bachelor of Arts from Brown University in 1999.

Pressman is openly gay. He and his husband, Daniel, have twin sons.

== Career ==
=== Early career ===
Pressman worked briefly in communications for the Bill Clinton administration before becoming an aide to United States Secretary of State Madeleine K. Albright, accompanying her to the United Nations, Camp David, and on several international trips. (Note: Destinations included Brunei, Belfast, Bangkok, Colombia, and Croatia.) Entering law school in the fall of 2001, he got his Juris Doctor from New York University School of Law in 2004, where he graduated magna cum laude and a member of the Order of the Coif.

During the 2004 presidential race, he served on Wesley Clark's National Security Working Group and then worked for the John Kerry's campaign. He later clerked for the Supreme Court of Rwanda, where he evaluated post-genocide transitional justice initiatives. After his return to the US, he worked at the Southern Poverty Law Center in Montgomery, Alabama. He also undertook an assignment in Sudan for the United Nations.

In early 2006, Pressman accompanied actor George Clooney and his father on a trip to Darfur to make a documentary. He then joined Clooney on several missions to Europe, Asia, the Middle East and Africa to lobby for peace in Darfur. Pressman joined Clooney in founding Not On Our Watch Project, an advocacy and grant-making organization focused on raising awareness about mass atrocities. Working as an attorney in private practice, he handled a variety of high-profile cases, including multiple wrongful conviction cases, leading in at least one instance to overturning the conviction of a man who spent 10 years in prison for a crime he did not commit.

=== Obama administration ===
Under President Barack Obama, Pressman served as an assistant secretary in the Department of Homeland Security, where he was responsible for policy development on global criminal justice issues. He served as the Director for War Crimes and Atrocities on the National Security Council, and was a member of the Atrocities Prevention Board.

On June 16, 2014, Obama nominated Pressman to be US Ambassador to the United Nations for Special Political Affairs–a role the New York Times has called both "the alternate" and "the deputy" US ambassador to the UN. He was confirmed by the Senate on September 17, 2014. While waiting for Senate confirmation he served as counselor to Ambassador Samantha Power. Pressman led United States negotiations with China resulting in a package of multilateral sanctions in response to nuclear activities on the Korean Peninsula.

In early 2015, he successfully lobbied against a Russia-led attempt to deny benefits to the same-sex partners of U.N. employees. (Note: "A UN general assembly budget committee voted 80-43 against the proposal. There were 37 abstentions, and 33 countries did not vote.") He participated in negotiations that produced sanctions against North Korea (Note: Samantha Power later said Pressman "is a person that I entrusted in the day-to-day to work with the Chinese ambassador to extract as robust a set of sanctions [against North Korea] as possible.") in March 2016 in response to that country's fourth nuclear test and placed the issue of human rights in North Korea on the agenda of the U.N. Security Council. As a spokesperson for the US, he praised the lifting of sanctions against Liberia as evidence of their success and denounced the failure of Sudanese authorities to take advantage of the support provided by the international community.

The day after a Orlando nightclub shooting in June 2016, Pressman told the UN General Assembly that denouncing terrorism was an insufficient response: "If we are united in our outrage by the killing of so many — and we are — let us be equally united around the basic premise of upholding the universal dignity of all persons regardless of who they love, not just around condemning the terrorists who kill them." He was influential in winning UN Security Council approval of a resolution that condemned "targeting persons as a result of their sexual orientation." It was the first time that body addressed sexual orientation and required what diplomats called "intense consultations" to overcome the reservations of countries that provide no civil protections for sexual orientation or criminalize homosexuality. (Note: In 2006, according to the New York Times, "In at least 74 countries, being gay is a crime. In at least 10 countries, gay sex is a crime punishable by death.")

=== In private practice ===
Pressman left government service in November 2016. He became the first executive director of George and Amal Clooney's family foundation, the Clooney Foundation for Justice, (Note: He continued as executive director of the foundation until at least July 2019.) and he joined the law firm of Boies, Schiller & Flexner as a partner in their New York City office. Managing partner Jonathan D. Schiller described his role as a "statesman-litigator": "He advises clients on navigating political and legal issues in cross-border deals, disputes with foreign governments, national security-related issues and public law disputes." His clients at Boies included Epic Games Inc., the New York Yankees Partnership, and Centene Corp. In June 2020 he moved to Jenner & Block, again as a partner based in New York City, where his clients included Princeton University, First Republic Bank, and the Oshkosh Corp.

Pressman was on Jenner's team of attorneys suing Russian banks in U.S. federal court in case over Malaysia Airlines Flight 17 in 2014. He worked on behalf of Lt. Col. Alexander S. Vindman in seeking corrections from Fox News and sued Saudi Crown Prince Mohammed bin Salman on behalf of Saad Aljabri, a former Saudi intelligence official. In 2021, he negotiated for the release of two Americans held for three years by China on charges they claimed were designed to pressure their father to return to China to face trial for financial crimes.

In October 2018, Pressman protested the U.S. State Department's new policy under Pompeo that denied visas to the same-sex partners of foreign employees of international institutions like the United Nations and the World Bank unless they were married. The State Department said the policy change was designed "to help ensure and promote equal treatment" between straight and gay couples"; Pressman called it "creative and cynical way to use the expansion of equality at home to vindictively target same-sex couples abroad," given that many of them were denied the right to marry in their home countries.

=== Appointment as ambassador to Hungary ===
On May 13, 2022, President Joe Biden announced his intent to nominate Pressman to be United States ambassador to Hungary. On May 17, 2022, his nomination was sent to the Senate. Hearings on his nomination were held before the Senate Foreign Relations Committee on June 23, 2022, and the committee favorably reported his nomination to the Senate floor on July 19, 2022. During Pressman's confirmation hearing, a rubber boat was seen in the Danube River near the embassy in Budapest carrying a sign written in English and Hungarian, "Mr. Pressman, don't colonize Hungary with your cult of death." He later displayed a photo of the protest behind his embassy desk. On July 28, 2022, his nomination was confirmed in the Senate by a 61–30 vote. He was sworn in on August 8, 2022, and presented his credentials to President Katalin Novák on September 14, 2022. He is the first US ambassador to Hungary in years who was not appointed for being a political donor.

=== Ambassadorship to Hungary ===
During his ambassadorship, relations between Pressman and the Fidesz-led Hungarian government were frosty. From the outset, Pressman was an outspoken critic of Fidesz and its leader, Viktor Orbán. He was regularly attacked by prominent Fidesz politicians and the Fidesz-controlled state media, which produced a highly "unusual" diplomatic situation between two NATO allies. Pressman was particularly critical of the Fidesz government's close relationship with Beijing, pervasive public corruption, efforts to restrict LGBT rights in Hungary, of Orbán's perceived closeness to Russian leader Vladimir Putin, and of Orbán's support for Donald Trump in the 2024 U.S. presidential election. Hungarian officials accused Pressman of interfering in Hungary's domestic politics by regularly appearing in public alongside opposition politicians and participating in politically controversial events like Budapest Pride. Foreign Minister Péter Szijjártó accused Pressman of behaving as an "activist" and "leader of the opposition."

Some observers viewed Pressman's sexuality as particularly problematic for Fidesz given the party's messaging around defending traditional family values. In April 2023, for instance, some linked Speaker of the National Assembly László Kövér's criticism of Pressman—"Mr. Pressman is one of the least classy ambassadors ever to set foot on Hungarian soil representing his own country… He talks nonsense, and he does it aggressively"—to Kövér's history of anti-American, homophobic, and anti-Semitic comments. Similarly, after Trump's reelection and Pressman's subsequent decision to depart Hungary in early 2025, Minister of Construction and Investment János Lázár said that "Hungary will never be like Mr. Pressman, and when his mandate expires, it would be wise for him to come nowhere near this country."

Due to these tensions, U.S.-Hungary relations reached a "new low" during Pressman's tenure. Just prior to his departure from Hungary, the U.S. Department of the Treasury sanctioned one of Orbán's closest advisors, Minister for the Prime Minister's Cabinet Office Antal Rogán, under the Magnitsky Act. The Hungarian government claimed this was an act of "petty revenge" on Pressman's part. Pressman and his family left Hungary on January 13, 2025.

== See also ==
- Ambassadors of the United States

== Notes ==
Diplomatic posts
Preceded by Jeffrey DeLaurentis	United States Ambassador to the United Nations for Special Political Affairs; 2014–2016	Succeeded by Robert A. Wood
Preceded by B. Bix Aliu; Chargé d'Affaires	United States Ambassador to Hungary; 2022–2025	Vacant
