= Irving B. Dudley =

American diplomat (1861–1911)

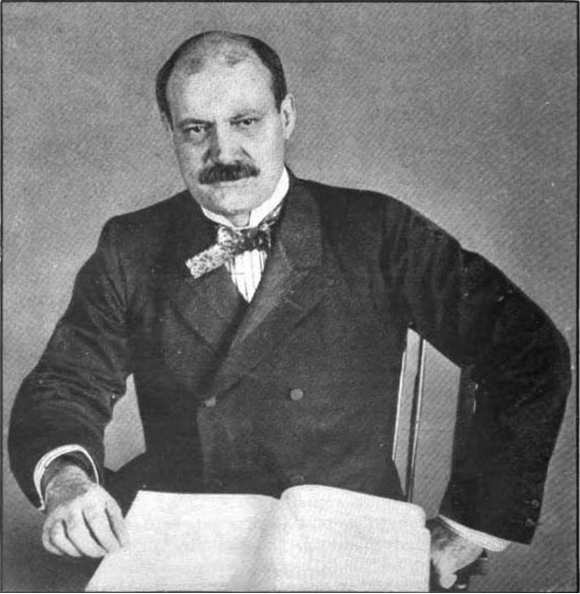

United States Ambassador to Brazil
- In office April 1, 1907 – September 16, 1911
- President: Theodore Roosevelt; William Howard Taft
- Preceded by: Lloyd Carpenter Griscom
- Succeeded by: Edwin Vernon Morgan

United States Minister to Peru
- In office September 20, 1897 – February 14, 1907
- President: William McKinley; Theodore Roosevelt
- Preceded by: James A. McKenzie
- Succeeded by: Leslie Combs III

Personal details
- Born: November 30, 1861 Jefferson, Ohio
- Died: November 27, 1911 (aged 49) Baltimore, Maryland
- Cause of death: Heart failure
- Party: Republican
- Spouse: Jane Agnes Kelly
- Children: 1
- Education: Kenyon College (BA); George Washington University (LL.B.)
- Profession: Lawyer, diplomat

Irving Bedell Dudley (November 30, 1861 – November 27, 1911) was an American lawyer and diplomat, who served as United States Ambassador to Brazil from 1907 to 1911.

== Biography ==
Born in Ohio, the son of a minister and his wife, Dudley studied at Kenyon College, graduating in 1882, before continuing to study law at Columbian University (now George Washington University), graduating in 1885; he was admitted to the bar that year, and worked for the War Department.

Three years later, in 1888, he moved to San Diego, California, where he was later elected a judge in 1890.

A Republican, Dudley was appointed United States Minister to Peru by President William McKinley on June 25, 1897; he took up his post in September of that year.

In December 1906, McKinley's successor, Theodore Roosevelt, appointed Dudley to be United States Ambassador to Brazil, a post he took up in April 1907.

Illness dogged Dudley and his wife during his career, and would ultimately contribute to his death: after staying at Johns Hopkins Hospital for treatment of an unrelated complaint, he died there of heart failure.

His wife would die in 1960, at the age of 87.

Diplomatic posts
Preceded by James A. McKenzie	United States Minister to Peru; 1897–1907	Succeeded by Leslie Combs III
Preceded by Lloyd Carpenter Griscom	United States Ambassador to Brazil; 1907–1911	Succeeded by Edwin Vernon Morgan
