= John Caulfield (diplomat) =

John Patrick Caulfield
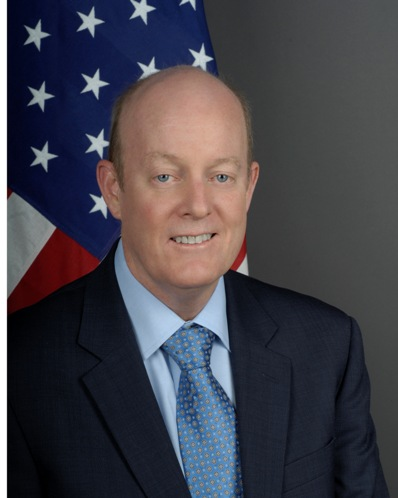

13th Chief of the U.S. Interests Section in Cuba
- In office September 12, 2011 – July 20, 2015
- President: Barack Obama
- Preceded by: Jonathan D. Farrar
- Succeeded by: Jeffrey DeLaurentis

Personal details
- Born: 1951 (age 74–75)
- Education: Saint Joseph's University

John Patrick Caulfield (born 1951) is the former Chief of the U.S. Interests Section in Cuba, a position he held from September 2011 to July 2014. Caulfield now works as an independent consultant and an advisor to the Innovadores Foundation.

In September 2008, Caulfield acted as the chargé d'affaires at the American embassy in Venezuela after Ambassador Patrick Duddy was expelled by then-president Hugo Chávez. He resumed the post from July 2010 through July 2011.

Caulfield served in the state department for over 30 years in a variety of posts, including consul general at the American embassy in London and deputy chief of mission at the American embassy in Lima, Peru. Caulfield is a graduate of Saint Joseph's University with a degree in international relations and Latin American studies.

== See also ==
- Cuban Thaw
