= Pierre N. Leval =

American judge (born 1936)

Pierre Leval

Senior Judge of the United States Court of Appeals for the Second Circuit
- Incumbent
- Assumed office August 16, 2002

Judge of the United States Court of Appeals for the Second Circuit
- In office October 20, 1993 – August 16, 2002
- Appointed by: Bill Clinton
- Preceded by: George C. Pratt
- Succeeded by: Richard C. Wesley

Judge of the United States District Court for the Southern District of New York
- In office October 31, 1977 – November 8, 1993
- Appointed by: Jimmy Carter
- Preceded by: Dudley Baldwin Bonsal
- Succeeded by: Sidney H. Stein

Personal details
- Born: Pierre Nelson Leval; September 4, 1936 (age 89) New York City, New York, U.S.
- Spouse: Susana Torruella
- Education: Harvard University (BA, JD)

Pierre Nelson Leval (born September 4, 1936) is a senior United States circuit judge of the United States Court of Appeals for the Second Circuit. At the time of his appointment by President Bill Clinton in 1993, he was a United States district judge of the United States District Court for the Southern District of New York.

== Early life and education ==
Born in New York City, Leval attended The Allen-Stevenson School, and received his Bachelor of Arts degree from Harvard College in 1959 and his Juris Doctor, magna cum laude, in 1963 from Harvard Law School, where he served as a notes editor of the Harvard Law Review.

== Career ==
Leval served in the United States Army in 1959. He was a law clerk for Judge Henry Friendly of the United States Court of Appeals for the Second Circuit from 1963 until 1964. Leval was an Assistant United States Attorney in the Southern District of New York from 1964 until 1968, serving there as chief appellate attorney from 1967 to 1968. From 1969 until 1975, Leval was in private law practice as an associate and then a partner in the New York firm of Cleary, Gottlieb, Steen & Hamilton. He joined the New York County District Attorney’s Office in 1975, where he served first as first assistant district attorney, and subsequently as chief assistant district attorney.

In 1990, while a District Court Judge, he published "Toward a Fair Use Standard", 103 Harv. L. Rev. 1105, which argued that the most critical element of the fair use analysis is the transformativeness of a work, the first of the statutory factors listed in the Copyright Act of 1976, 17 U.S.C. § 107. Leval's article was cited in Campbell v. Acuff-Rose Music, Inc., a 1994 Supreme Court decision which marked a shift in judicial treatment of fair use toward a transformativeness analysis and away from emphasizing the "commerciality" analysis of the fourth factor. Prior to Leval's article, the fourth factor had often been described as the most important of the factors.

== Federal judicial service ==
Leval was nominated by President Jimmy Carter on October 17, 1977, to a seat on the United States District Court for the Southern District of New York vacated by Judge Dudley Baldwin Bonsal. He was confirmed by the United States Senate on October 29, 1977, and received commission on October 31, 1977. During his tenure on the Southern District, he presided over the 1985-87 Pizza Connection Trial, a major prosecution against both the American and Sicilian Mafias and the longest criminal trial in the judicial history of the United States. His service terminated on November 8, 1993, due to elevation to the Second Circuit.

Leval was nominated by President Bill Clinton on August 6, 1993, to a seat on the United States Court of Appeals for the Second Circuit vacated by Judge George C. Pratt. He was confirmed by the Senate on October 18, 1993, and received commission on October 20, 1993. He assumed senior status on August 16, 2002.

Leval was a board member of the Federal Judicial Center from 2002 to 2006.

== Other service and awards ==
Leval was a member of the adjunct faculty of the New York University School of Law. He was awarded the Hillmon Memorial Fellowship by the University of Wisconsin–Madison in 1988; the Donald R. Brace Memorial Lectureship by the Copyright Society of the U.S.A. in 1989; the Fowler Harper Memorial Fellowship by Yale Law School in 1992; the Melville Nimmer Lectureship by UCLA Law School in 1997; the Learned Hand Medal of the Federal Bar Council in 1997; and the University of Connecticut School of Law's Intellectual Property Keynote Lectureship for 2001. He assumed senior status in 2002.

== See also ==
- List of United States federal judges by longevity of service

Legal offices
Preceded by Dudley Baldwin Bonsal	Judge of the United States District Court for the Southern District of New York; 1977–1993	Succeeded by Sidney H. Stein
Preceded by George C. Pratt	Judge of the United States Court of Appeals for the Second Circuit; 1993–2002	Succeeded by Richard C. Wesley
