= Philip Bonsal =

American diplomat (1903–1995)

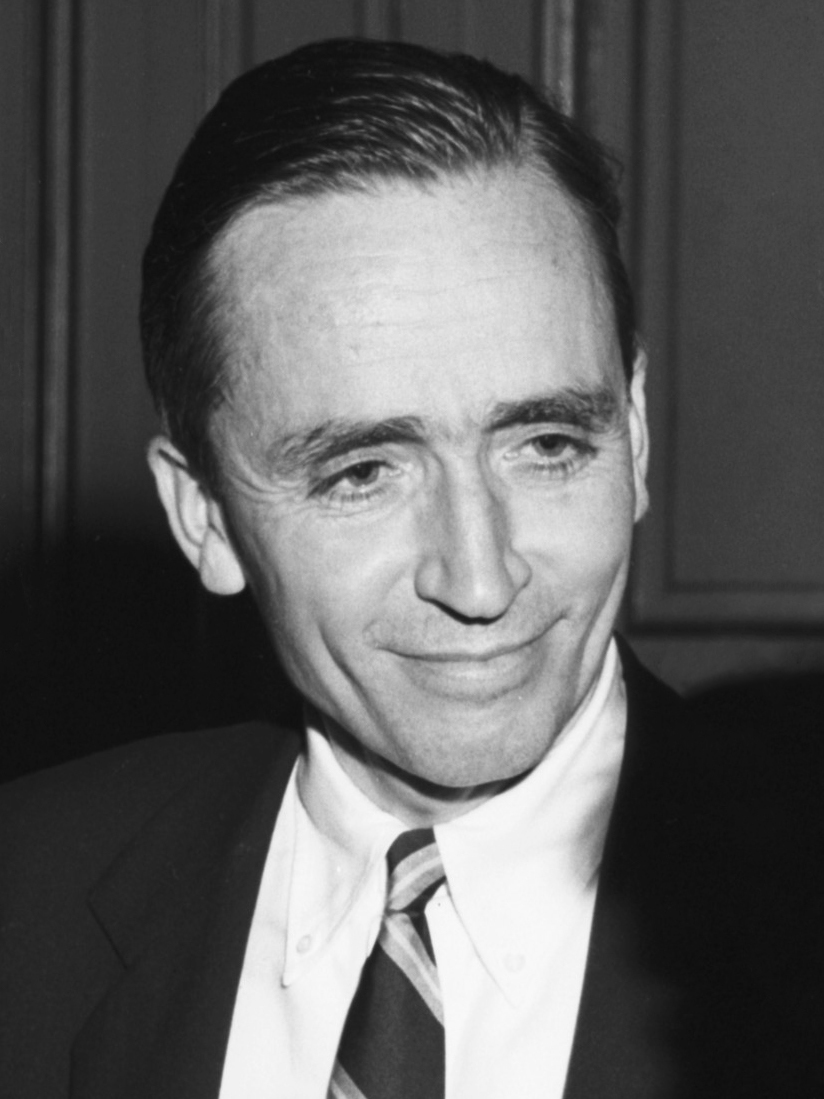

United States Ambassador to Morocco
- In office May 24, 1961 – August 8, 1962
- President: John F. Kennedy
- Preceded by: Charles Woodruff Yost
- Succeeded by: John H. Ferguson

United States Ambassador to Cuba
- In office March 3, 1959 – October 28, 1960
- President: Dwight D. Eisenhower
- Preceded by: Earl E. T. Smith
- Succeeded by: Jeffrey DeLaurentis (Acting, in 2015)

United States Ambassador to Bolivia
- In office May 10, 1957 – February 6, 1959
- President: Dwight D. Eisenhower
- Preceded by: Gerald A. Drew
- Succeeded by: Carl W. Strom

United States Ambassador to Colombia
- In office April 1, 1955 – April 24, 1957
- President: Dwight D. Eisenhower
- Preceded by: Rudolf E. Schoenfeld
- Succeeded by: John M. Cabot

Personal details
- Born: Philip Wilson Bonsal; May 22, 1903 New York City, U.S.
- Died: June 28, 1995 (aged 92) Washington, D.C., U.S.
- Spouse: Margaret Lockett
- Parent(s): Stephen Bonsal; Henrietta Morris
- Relatives: Dudley Baldwin Bonsal (brother); Gouverneur Morris Jr. (great-grandfather); Gouverneur Morris (great-great-grandfather)

Philip Wilson Bonsal (May 22, 1903 – June 28, 1995) was an American career diplomat with the U.S. Department of State. A specialist on Latin America, he served as United States Ambassador to Cuba from February 1959 until October 1960, the first months of the Castro regime.

== Early years ==
Bonsal was born in New York City on May 22, 1903. His father was Stephen Bonsal (1865–1951), a well-known journalist who served several years in the US diplomatic corps, wrote several books, and won a Pulitzer Prize. (Note: Stephen Bonsal covered the Spanish–American War and many other conflicts for the New York Herald and reported on the revolution in Mexico for the New York Times in 1910–1911. He spent several years in the U.S. diplomatic corps and served as President Wilson's translator at the Paris Peace Conference. Among his eight books, his memoir of the Versailles Peace Conference won the Pulitzer Prize for History in 1945.) The Bonsals descended from English Quakers who participated in founding the colony of Pennsylvania in 1682. His mother was Henrietta Morris, a descendant of Gouverneur Morris, a leader in the American Revolution. He had three brothers, including New York judge Dudley Baldwin Bonsal.

Bonsal's early education took place in the Philippines and Switzerland. He graduated from Yale in 1924.

Bonsal married Margaret Lockett of Knoxville, Tennessee, circa 1929.

After living in Cuba for several months as a student trainee with the Cuban Telephone Company, Bonsal worked in Spain and Chile for its parent company, International Telephone & Telegraph, rising to become chief of its Latin American Division. He then entered government service as a specialist in telephone services with the Federal Communications Commission, where he remained from 1935 to 1937.

Bonsal was fluent in Spanish.

== Diplomatic service ==
Bonsal joined the State Department in 1937. He was Vice Consul and Third Secretary in the US embassy in Havana in 1938 and 1939, followed by a year in Washington as Cuban desk officer at the State Department.

While on the staff of the US embassy in Bolivia in 1944, he tried without success to persuade the State Department to ignore the rhetoric of Bolivia's radical opposition parties, which he excused as reflexive opposition to the recently ousted pro-American regime of Enrique Peñaranda. He told Secretary of State Cordell Hull that the Movimiento Nacionalista Revolucionario (MNR) embodied the "legitimate and respectable... aspirations of certain sectors of the Bolivian people." Instead, the US forced President Gualberto Villarroel to remove members of the MNR from his cabinet.

Bonsal served as an adviser at the 1954 Geneva Conference on Korea and Indochina.

=== Colombia ===
Eisenhower nominated Bonsal as United States Ambassador to Colombia in February 1955. The US Senate confirmed the appointment on February 11, and he presented his credentials on April 1. He maintained friendly relations with opposition politicians, angering Colombian dictator General Gustavo Rojas Pinilla, who persuaded the State Department to reassign him.

In January 1957, representing the US at the United Nations General Assembly's Special Political Committee, he supported a Philippine proposal, endorsed by representatives of Peru, Nepal, and other nations, for the UN to modify its confrontational approach in fighting apartheid in South Africa and to shift to tactics that would promote discussion and recognize the problem of racial discrimination in other countries as well.

Eisenhower nominated him as United States Ambassador to Bolivia on March 18, 1957. He concluded his service in Colombia on April 24, 1957.

=== Bolivia ===
Bonsal served as United States Ambassador to Bolivia from 1957 to 1959. He wholeheartedly supported the US economic assistance program under way there, which he later described as a "pioneer" and "solitary example" of what was required of the US in Latin America.

=== Cuba ===
In January 1959, Eisenhower named Bonsal United States Ambassador to Cuba just days after Fidel Castro came to power. The New York Times called his appointment "a splendid choice" and described him as "a distinguished career diplomat" with "every qualification that could be asked for the difficult and gratifying task he is taking on." Bonsal's predecessor, Earl E. T. Smith, had maintained friendly relations with Cuban dictator Fulgencio Batista and was quickly recalled by the State Department after Batista's ouster. It has been argued that the choice of Bonsal signaled an intention on the part of the State Department to defuse the Cuban Revolution in the same way that it had defused the Bolivian Revolution of 1952.

Bonsal attempted to find a working arrangement with the leader of the new government. Bonsal admitted that "animosity was inevitable" but that he was hopeful that "at some point we can get down to a reasoned dialogue." Castro was critical of the arrival of Bonsal in the Cuban press and compared him to a colonial viceroy, and dialogue was not easily forthcoming.

When Bonsal testified before a closed session of the House Committee on Foreign Relations in May 1959, he explained why the revolution had such widespread popular support: "the corruption and the sadism of many Batista henchmen united most Cubans against the regime." He described how Batista's security forces had killed many while "many, many more were arrested on no charges and kept in jail for indefinite periods."

In August, he protested to Secretary of State Herter that Cuban-American relations were being poisoned by the fact that the US was allowing several hundred Batista allies to live in the country, which appeared to the Cubans as harboring counter-revolutionaries. He urged them to be forced to "move on to some other country."

On September 3, 1959, Bonsal met with Castro and express concern that American businesses, which had complied fully with the Land Reform Law, were concerned that government agents were acting arbitrarily and without legal sanction. He complained of anti-American comments by Guevara, who was then on a world tour. Castro advised patience and forbearance with "the exuberances of young and inexperienced revolutionaries."

In October 1959, Castro called the US "accomplices" of Batista loyalists forces who had launched air attacks on Cuba. Bonsal lodged a formal protest with Cuban President Osvaldo Dorticós on October 27 and blamed Castro for the deterioration of relations.

In mid-1960, the Cuban government reached an agreement to sell 700,000 tons of sugar to the Soviet Union, leading to a series of escalating actions by the US and Cuba. The US suspended sugar imports, Cuba nationalized American-owned businesses, and on October 19, the US imposed an embargo on US exports to Cuba except for food and medicine. Bonsal thought the Eisenhower administration was over-reacting and forcing Castro into an alliance with the Soviets.

After Castro called for a reduction in the staff of the US embassy in Havana, Bonsal was recalled to Washington in October 1960.

Formal diplomatic relations between the two countries were severed shortly afterward, and US diplomatic representation in Cuba was handled by the United States Interests Section in Havana, part of the embassy of Switzerland. That arrangement lasted until July 20, 2015, with the culmination of the Cuban Thaw.

Some leading members of the US Congress felt his attempt at a conciliatory approach to the Castro regime represented an appeasement of communism.

=== Morocco ===
Bonsal was United States Ambassador to Morocco from 1961 to 1962. He retired from government service in 1965.

== Later years ==
As of 1971, he called for "disengagement from a bankrupt Vietnam policy" by noting that China and Russia had invested comparatively modest resources in the conflict, compared to the American loss of 40,000 lives. He hoped that all the major powers would nevertheless recognize that "big-power confrontation by proxy is so repulsively destructive of the welfare of the proxies as to render its repetition elsewhere inconceivable".

He also described the Pentagon Papers as "stolen property" and objected to those who ignored the violation of government secrecy standards because the revelations supported their political judgment.

Bonsal published a memoir, "Cuba, Castro and the United States," in 1971.

Bonsal died of pneumonia on June 28, 1995, at the age of 92. He was survived by his wife.

His papers are held by the Library of Congress.

== See also ==
- Cuba-United States relations
- History of Cuba

== Notes ==
Diplomatic posts
Preceded by Rudolf E. Schoenfeld	United States Ambassador to Colombia; April 1, 1955 – April 24, 1957	Succeeded by John M. Cabot
Preceded by Gerald A. Drew	United States Ambassador to Bolivia; May 10, 1957 – February 6, 1959	Succeeded by Carl W. Strom
Preceded by Earl E. T. Smith	United States Ambassador to Cuba; March 3, 1959 – October 28, 1960	Succeeded by Jeffrey DeLaurentis^{1} beginning 2015
Preceded by Charles Woodruff Yost	United States Ambassador to Morocco; May 24, 1961 – August 8, 1962	Succeeded by John H. Ferguson
Notes and references
1. The U.S. and Cuba did not have bilateral diplomatic relations between 1961 and 2015.
