= Jeffrey DeLaurentis =

American diplomat; U.S. Ambassador to Cuba from 2015 to 2017

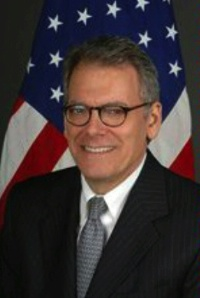

U.S. Ambassador to the United Nations for Special Political Affairs
- Acting
- In office January 26, 2021 – 2023
- President: Joe Biden

United States Ambassador to Cuba
- Acting
- In office July 20, 2015 – July 7, 2017
- President: Barack Obama; Donald Trump
- Preceded by: Philip W. Bonsal (1960); Daniel M. Braddock (Acting)
- Succeeded by: Scott Hamilton (Acting)

Chief of the U.S. Interests Section in Cuba
- In office August 2014 – July 20, 2015
- President: Barack Obama
- Preceded by: John Caulfield
- Succeeded by: Position abolished

U.S. Ambassador to the United Nations for Special Political Affairs
- In office August 10, 2011 – August 2014
- President: Barack Obama
- Preceded by: David Dunn
- Succeeded by: David Pressman

Personal details
- Born: 1954 (age 71–72)
- Education: Georgetown University; Columbia University

Jeffrey DeLaurentis (born 1954) is an American diplomat who served as the Chargé d'affaires ad interim of the Embassy of the United States, Havana from 2015 to 2017 and served as the acting United States ambassador for special political affairs at the United Nations.

DeLaurentis has ambassadorial rank in the State Department because his prior position at the UN was a US Senate-confirmed ambassadorial position. Cuba and the United States formally restored diplomatic relations on July 20, 2015, after having severed diplomatic ties in 1961 amid the Cold War.

== Early life and education ==
DeLaurentis is a graduate of the Edmund A. Walsh School of Foreign Service at Georgetown University and the School of International and Public Affairs at Columbia University. He also studied toward a doctorate in political science at Columbia's Graduate School of Arts and Sciences.

== Career ==
DeLaurentis began his diplomatic career as a consular officer in 1991, posted to Havana, Cuba. Later he returned to Cuba in 1999 serving as the political-economic section chief until 2002. He also served as Political Counselor at the U.S. Mission to the United Nations in Geneva, and Political Counselor at the U.S. Embassy in Bogota. Stateside, DeLaurentis served as executive assistant to the Under Secretary of State for Democracy and Global Affairs, Special Assistant to the Assistant Secretary of State for Western Hemisphere Affairs, and Director of Inter-American Affairs at the National Security Council. His last diplomatic assignment was at the Harvard Kennedy School as a senior diplomatic fellow with the Belfer Center Future of Diplomacy Project.

Barack Obama officially nominated DeLaurentis as United States Ambassador to Cuba on September 27, 2016.

DeLaurentis finished his 3-year cycle on July 7, 2017, and was replaced by Scott Hamilton.

DeLaurentis served as the Warburg Chair in International Relations at Simmons University in Boston, Massachusetts from 2023 to 2025.

== See also ==
- United States–Cuban Thaw

Diplomatic posts
Preceded by David Dunn	United States Ambassador to the United Nations for Special Political Affairs; 2011–2014	Succeeded by David Pressman
Preceded by John Caulfield	Chief of the U.S. Interests Section in Cuba; 2014–2015	Position abolished
Position reestablished^{1} Title last held by Philip Bonsal	United States Ambassador to Cuba; Acting; 2015–2017	Succeeded by Scott Hamilton
Notes and references
1. The U.S. and Cuba did not have bilateral diplomatic relations between 1961 and 2015. Philip Bonsal was DeLaurentis's predecessor in the position, leaving office on October 28, 1960.
