= Noble Judah Estate =

Historic house in Illinois, United States

- U.S. National Register of Historic Places
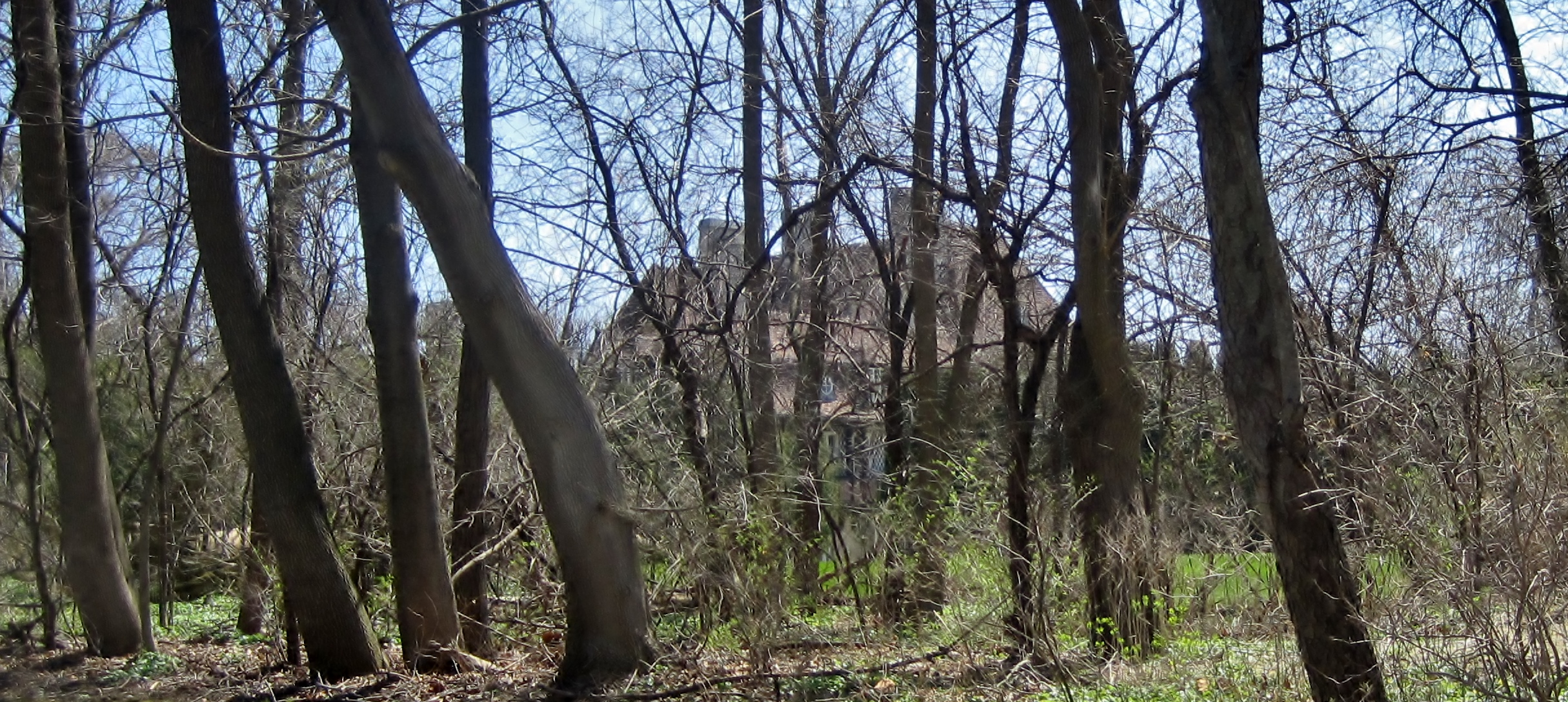

- Location within Chicago metropolitan area Location within Illinois Location within the United States
- Location: 111 and 211 W. Westminster St., Lake Forest, Illinois
- Coordinates: 42°15′09″N 87°51′00″W
- Area: 7 acres (2.8 ha)
- Architect: Philip L. Goodwin
- Architectural style: French Renaissance Revival
- NRHP reference No.: 90001197
- Added to NRHP: August 3, 1990

The Noble Judah Estate is a historic estate at 111 and 211 West Westminster Street in Lake Forest, Illinois, United States. The estate was built from 1925 to 1928 for lawyer Noble Brandon Judah, his wife and National Cash Register heiress Dorothy Patterson, and their children. It includes a main house, a garden, a pool, and several small outbuildings. The main house and the outbuildings were given French Renaissance Revival designs by architect Philip L. Goodwin; their designs include steep roofs, decorative brickwork, and half-timbering. The estate's landscape design was inspired by traditional French gardens and includes a small Korean boxwood garden with a geometric layout.

The estate was added to the National Register of Historic Places on August 3, 1990.
