= Mara Tekach =

US diplomat

United States Ambassador to Cuba
- Acting
- In office July 20, 2018 – July 21, 2020
- President: Donald Trump
- Preceded by: Philip Goldberg (Acting)
- Succeeded by: Timothy Zúñiga-Brown (Acting)

Mara Tekach, a career member of the Senior Foreign Service (rank of Minister Counselor), was the Chargée d’Affaires at the U.S. Embassy in Havana, Cuba, from 2018 to 2020.

== Education ==
Tekach earned a Bachelor of Science in economics from the Wharton School of the University of Pennsylvania, a Masters of Arts in International Affairs from the School of International and Public Affairs, Columbia University and a Doctor of Education from Teachers College, Columbia University.

== Career ==
Dr. Tekach was a Peace Corps Volunteer in Niamey, Niger prior to joining the Foreign Service. Immediately prior to her post in Cuba, she served as Deputy Assistant Secretary (DAS) for Public Diplomacy for the Department of State’s Bureau of Western Hemisphere Affairs. Other posts include DAS for Professional and Cultural Exchanges at the U.S. Department of State’s Bureau of Educational and Cultural Affairs (ECA) and Deputy Director of Communications at the United States Mission to the United Nations in New York.

=== Controversy in Cuba ===
On November 20, 2019, Tekach was accused of “working closely” with Cuban human rights activist José Daniel Ferrer. The Cuban government believes the purpose of the American mission in Cuba is to promote “peaceful bilateral relations” but instead, it and “particularly its chargé d’affaires have focused in recent months on the failed purpose of recruiting mercenaries, promoting division and confusion among our people, identifying the areas of the economy against which to direct coercive measures, and trying to slander and discredit the work of the Cuban government and the Revolution.” The statement continued that “it was open instigation to violence.”

The week before, the embassy posted a video on Twitter showing Tekach with Nelva Ismarays Ortega, who is a partner of Ferrer and leader of Patriotic Union of Cuba (UNPACU), described as the country’s most active opposition organization. Tekach and Ortega pled for Ferrer’s release from custody. American secretary of state Mike Pompeo condemned the accusations stating the US would continue to speak out against the treatment of human rights activists in Cuba and that this was an attempted distraction from their treatment of Ferrer.
