= Philip L. Goodwin =

American architect (1885–1958)

Philip Lippincott Goodwin
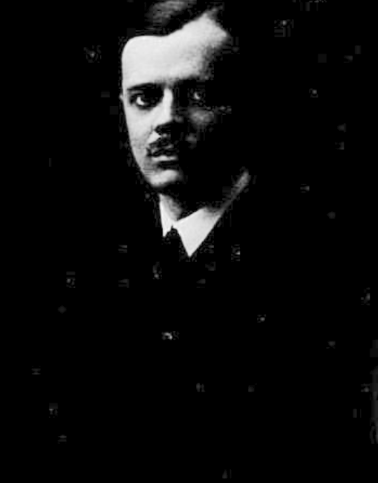
- Philip L. Goodwin 1921 Passport Photo
- Born: March 14, 1885; New York City, United States
- Died: February 12, 1958 (aged 72); New York City, United States
- Education: Yale University; Columbia University School of Architecture
- Occupation: architect
- Buildings: Museum of Modern Art

Philip Lippincott Goodwin (March 14, 1885 – February 12, 1958) was an American architect who was the co-designer of the Museum of Modern Art in New York City.

== Early life and education ==
Goodwin was born on March 14, 1885 in New York City. His father was banker, James Junius Goodwin, a first cousin to J. P. Morgan Jr. of the Morgan family. His mother was Josephine Sarah Lippincott.

Goodwin attended college at Yale University and graduated in 1907. He went to graduate school at the Columbia Graduate School of Architecture, Planning and Preservation from 1909 to 1912 and studied architecture at the École des Beaux-Arts in Paris from 1914 to 1915.

== Career ==
When Goodwin came back to the United States from Paris, he gained employment with the New York office of Delano & Aldrich, where he worked from 1914 to 1916. He then formed a partnership with Roger Bullard and Heathcote M. Woolsey, and started a new firm, Goodwin, Bullard & Woolsey. By 1921, he became an independent architect. Goodwin retired in 1953.

In 1939, Goodwin designed the Museum of Modern Art (MoMA) along with fellow architect, Edward Durell Stone, which was later expanded by Philip Johnson. He was on the Board of Trustees of the museum, Chairman of the Architecture Department (1935-), and used the traditional Beaux-Arts architecture style. He spent two months in Brazil with G. E. Kidder Smith in preparation for the project.

He was vice-chairman of the Board at MoMA, as well as the Chairman and chief supporter of the Department of Architecture; Chairman of the Exhibitions Committee; and a member of the Committee on the Museum Collections.

His design of the Noble Judah Estate was added to the National Register of Historic Places on August 3, 1990. The estate was built from 1925 to 1928 for lawyer Noble Brandon Judah, his wife and National Cash Register heiress Dorothy Patterson, and their children. It includes a main house, a garden, a pool, and several small outbuildings. His French Renaissance Revival designs include steep roofs, decorative brickwork, and half-timbering. The estate's landscape design was inspired by traditional French gardens and includes a small Korean boxwood garden with a geometric layout.

He was a member of the American Institute of Architects (AIA), and became a Fellow in 1935. He was Chairman of the AIA Committee on Foreign Relations (1942-). He was also a member of the Architectural League of New York and Trustee of the Beaux-Arts Institute of Design.

== World War I ==
He was a 1st Lieutenant in the Infantry Division of the American Expeditionary Forces during World War I. Goodwin was also a member of the International Division of the American Commission to Negotiate Peace, in 1919. He was helping to negotiate the peace in Hungary.

== Personal life ==
He owned an extensive collection of sculptures, paintings, and water colors from various renowned artists. Upon his death, his collection was divided between Yale University Art Gallery, Wadsworth Atheneum, and the Museum of Modern Art.

Goodwin died on February 12, 1958.

His nephew was playwright, David Hare (playwright).

== Notable projects ==
- Museum of Modern Art, in New York City (with Edward Durell Stone)
- Noble Judah Estate, historic house in Illinois.

=== Projects never completed ===
- Smithsonian American Art Museum, in Washington, D.C. (not built)
- Yale University Art Gallery in New Haven, Connecticut (not built)

Goodwin came in third place in the 1939 competition to build the new Smithsonian Institution art museum, along with Albert Frey and L.C. Jaeger.

In 1950, Yale University asked him to design their new art museum, but he rejected the project in 1951 as too difficult. The United States was engaging in the Korean War at the time and building supplies were being rationed. The project was then given to Louis Kahn.

== Awards ==
- Second Place in the 1939 Museum of Modern Art competition for the Festival Theatre building at the College of William & Mary
- Third Place in the 1939 Smithsonian Gallery of Art competition, along with Albert Frey and L.C. Jaeger.

== Publications ==
- Brazil Builds: Architecture New and Old, 1652-1942, by Philip L. Goodwin. 1945. Museum of Modern Art (publisher).
- Rooftrees: or, The architectural history of an American family. England, MDCXXX-New England, MCMXXX. Philip L. Goodwin.
- Architectural bird houses as made and carved by the boys of the Greenwich House Workshops. Philip Lippincott Goodwin. 1930.
- French architecture as source material. Philip Lippincott Goodwin. 1931.
- French provincial architecture as shown in various examples of town & country houses, shops & public places adaptable to American conditions. Philip Lippincott Goodwin. 1924.
- Forewords:
  - Built in USA : 1932-1944, edited by Elizabeth Mock, foreword by Philip L. Goodwin. 1944. Museum of Modern Art (publisher).
  - Guide to Modern Architecture in the Northeast States. 1940. Edited with an introduction by John McAndrew. Foreword by Philip L. Goodwin.
