= Timothy Zúñiga-Brown =

American diplomat

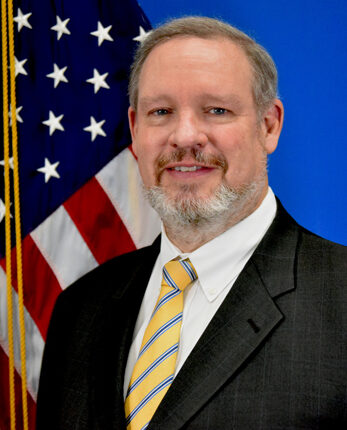

Chargé d'Affaires, U.S. Embassy in Havana
- In office July 31, 2020 – July 14, 2022
- President: Donald Trump; Joe Biden
- Preceded by: Mara Tekach
- Succeeded by: Benjamin G. Ziff

Consul General, U.S. Consulate General in Monterrey
- In office August 2015 – September 2018
- President: Donald Trump

Deputy Chief of Mission, U.S. Embassy in Quito
- In office July 2011 – April 2012
- President: Barack Obama

Chargé d'Affaires, U.S. Embassy in Nassau
- In office January 20, 2009 – September 9, 2009
- President: Barack Obama

Personal details
- Education: American University, National War College

Timothy Zúñiga-Brown is an American diplomat. He was chargé d'affaires of the Embassy of the United States in Havana, Cuba, between July 31, 2020 and July 14, 2022. He previously served as the chargé d'affaires at the U.S. Embassy in Nassau, Bahamas, from January 2009 until September 9, 2009, as well as in Quito, Ecuador, from July 2011 until April 2012. From August 2015 to September 2018, he was Consul General and Principal Officer at U.S. Consulate General in Monterrey, Mexico.
