= Stephen Bonsal =

American journalist and diplomat (1865–1951)

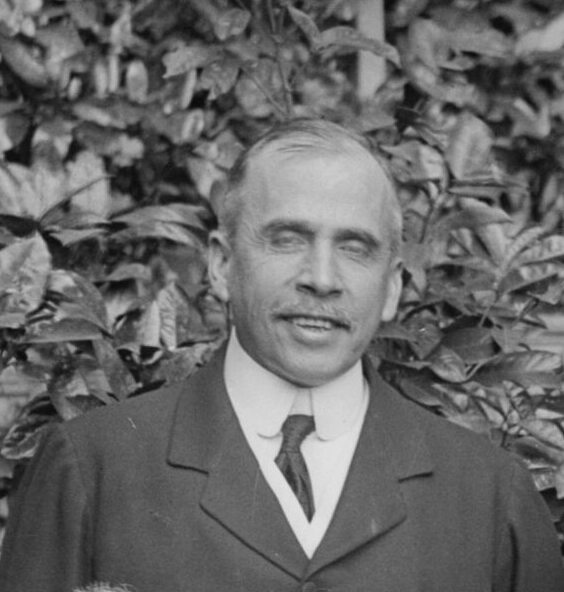
- Bonsal in 1916
- Born: March 29, 1865; Baltimore, Maryland, U.S.
- Died: June 8, 1951 (aged 86)
- Occupations: journalist, war correspondent, diplomat, translator
- Years active: 1885–1951

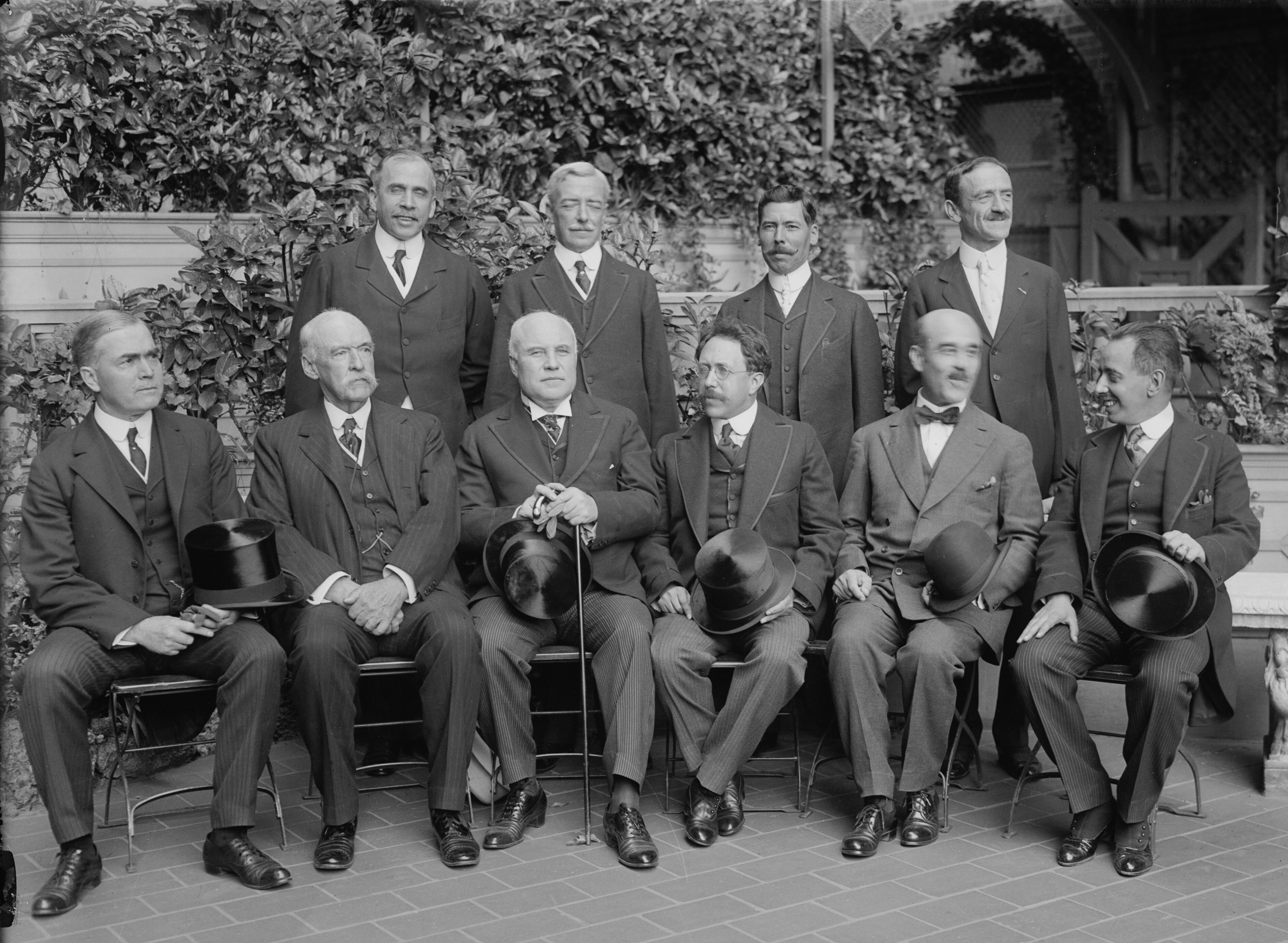
The United States–Mexico Commission. Standing from left to right are: Stephen Bonsal, Attache of the State Department and Advisor to the American Commission; American Secretary of State Robert Lansing; Eliseo Arredondo, the Mexican ambassador designate, and Leo Stanton Rowe, the Secretary to the American Commission. Sitting from left to right are John Mott of New York City; Judge George Gray of Wilmington, Delaware; Secretary of the Interior Franklin Knight Lane; Luis Cabrera Lobato, chairman of the Mexican delegation and Secretary of the Treasury of Mexico, Alberto J. Pani, President of the National Railways of Mexico; and Ignacio Bonillas, Minister of Communications and Public Works.. The image was taken at the Biltmore Hotel in New York City on September 9, 1916.

Stephen Bonsal (March 29, 1865 – June 8, 1951) was an American journalist, war correspondent, author, diplomat, and translator, who won the 1945 Pulitzer Prize for History.

== Early life and education ==
Bonsal was born in Baltimore, Maryland, in 1865. He was educated at St. Paul's School in Concord, New Hampshire. He continued his studies in Heidelberg, Bonn, and Vienna. He married Henrietta Fairfax Morris in March 1900. Bonsal traveled extensively. He claimed that he had visited all the countries of Europe, South America, and Asia with the exception of Persia.

== Journalist ==
Bonsal was later a special correspondent of the New York Herald (1885–1907), reporting the development of military conflicts including:

- Serbo-Bulgarian War, 1885
- Macedonian uprising, 1890
- First Sino-Japanese War, 1895
- Cuban insurrection, 1897
- Spanish–American War, 1898
- Chinese relief expedition, 1900
- Samar, Batangas, Mindanao, 1901
- Venezuela, Matas rebellion, blockage, 1903
- Russo-Japanese War, 1904–1905

He was a foreign correspondent for the New York Times in 1910–1911.

== Diplomat ==
In 1891–1896, Bonsal served as secretary and chargé-d'affaire of the US diplomatic missions in Beijing, Seoul and Tokyo. He also served for a short time at the U.S. embassy in Madrid.

== World War I ==
During World War I, Bonsal served in the American Expeditionary Forces with the rank of lieutenant colonel. Afterwards, he was President Woodrow Wilson's private translator during the 1919 Peace Conference in Paris.

== Later life ==
Unfinished Business (1944), a diary describing his experiences during the Paris Peace Treaty negotiations and all the Allied infighting and waxing lyrical about the plight of the wounded veterans and their families, won him the 1945 Pulitzer Prize for History.

"No one else has presented the plight of the plain people of Europe, in relation to the strained secrecy of the Conference, and few have written of their agony as does Colonel Bonsal in terms so hardheaded and so poignant," Time magazine reported on his death.

His second son, Philip Bonsal, was a career diplomat. Another son, Dudley Bonsal, was a United States District Judge of the United States District Court for the Southern District of New York.

== Selected works ==
- Morocco as It Is (1894, W. H. Allen, London)
- The Real Condition of Cuba Today (1897, Harper, New York, NY)
- The Fight for Santiago (1899, Doubleday & McClure, New York, NY)
- The Golden Horseshoe (1906, Macmillan, New York, NY)
- The American Mediterranean (1912, Moffat and Yard, New York, NY)
- Edward Fitzgerald Beale: A Pioneer in the Path of Empire, 1823–1903 (1912, Putnam, New York, NY)
- Heyday in a Vanished World (1937, Norton, New York, NY) (autobiography)
- Unfinished Business (1944, Doubleday, New York, NY) (1945 Pulitzer Prize for History)
- When the French Were Here (1945, Doubleday, New York, NY)
- Suitors and Supplicants (1946, Prentice-Hall, New York, NY)
- The Cause of Liberty (1947, M. Joseph, London)
