= Daniel and Florence Guggenheim Foundation =

American nonprofit organization

The Daniel and Florence Guggenheim Foundation was a nonprofit philanthropic organization headquartered at 950 Third Avenue in Manhattan, New York, United States.

== History ==
The Daniel and Florence Guggenheim Foundation was founded in 1924 by Florence (née Shloss) and Daniel Guggenheim.

Between 1930 and 1941 the foundation financed Robert H. Goddard. When the United States government settled a patent lawsuit for infringing the Goddard patent for liquid fuel rockets, that money was awarded to the foundation.

In the early 1960s, the foundation donated 17.2 acres (7.0 ha) of land in Sands Point, New York to the Port Washington Union Free School District, for the construction of an elementary school; this school would be named the Florence and Daniel Guggenheim Elementary School and opened in September 1962.

The foundation was terminated on June 30, 2011. The Daniel and Florence Guggenheim Foundation Program on Demography, Technology and Criminal Justice has taken over some of the functions.

== See also ==
- Guggenheim family
