= Dudley Baldwin Bonsal =

American judge (1906–1995)

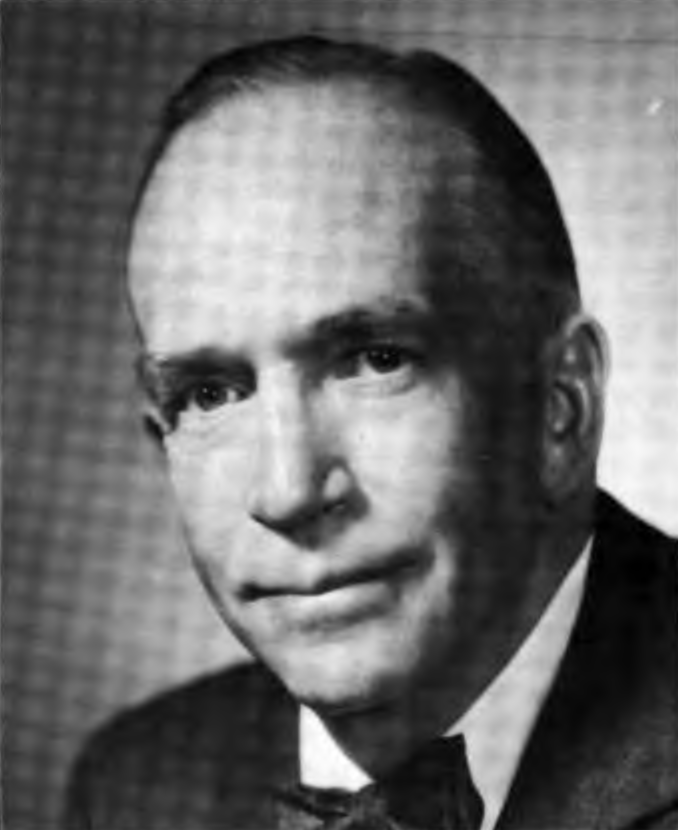

Judge of the United States Foreign Intelligence Surveillance Court
- In office December 2, 1981 – May 18, 1984
- Appointed by: Warren Burger
- Preceded by: James Hargrove Meredith
- Succeeded by: Edward Devitt

Senior Judge of the United States District Court for the Southern District of New York
- In office December 6, 1976 – July 22, 1995

Judge of the United States District Court for the Southern District of New York
- In office October 5, 1961 – December 6, 1976
- Appointed by: John F. Kennedy
- Preceded by: Seat established by 75 Stat. 80
- Succeeded by: Pierre N. Leval

Personal details
- Born: October 6, 1906 Bedford, New York, U.S.
- Died: July 22, 1995 (aged 88) Bedford, New York, U.S.
- Parent(s): Stephen Bonsal; Henrietta Morris
- Relatives: Philip Bonsal (brother); Gouverneur Morris Jr. (great-grandfather); Gouverneur Morris (great-great-grandfather)
- Education: Dartmouth College (A.B.); Harvard Law School (LL.B.)
- Occupation: Judge

Dudley Baldwin Bonsal (October 6, 1906 – July 22, 1995) was a United States district judge of the United States District Court for the Southern District of New York.

== Early life and background ==
Bonsal was born in Bedford, New York, the son of Stephen Bonsal (1865–1951) and Henrietta Morris, Stephen Bonsal was a well-known journalist who served several years in the US diplomatic corps, wrote several books, and won a Pulitzer Prize. (Note: Stephen Bonsal covered the Spanish–American War and many other conflicts for the New York Herald and reported on the revolution in Mexico for The New York Times in 1910–1911. He spent several years in the U.S. diplomatic corps and served as President Wilson's translator at the Paris Peace Conference. Among his eight books, his memoir of the Versailles Peace Conference won the Pulitzer Prize for History in 1945.) The Bonsals descended from English Quakers who participated in founding the colony of Pennsylvania in 1682. Henrietta Morris was a descendant of Gouverneur Morris, a leader in the American Revolution. He had three brothers, including American diplomat Philip Bonsal.

== Education and career ==
Bonsal received an Artium Baccalaureus degree from Dartmouth College in 1927 and a Bachelor of Laws from Harvard Law School in 1930. He was in private practice in New York City, New York from 1930 to 1942. He was chief counsel to the Office of the Coordinator of Inter-American Affairs from 1942 to 1945, returning to private practice in New York City from 1945 to 1961, and from 1958 to 1960 served as president of the New York City Bar Association.

=== Federal judicial service ===
On October 5, 1961, Bonsal received a recess appointment from President John F. Kennedy to a new seat on the United States District Court for the Southern District of New York created by 75 Stat. 80. He was formally nominated to the same seat by President Kennedy on January 15, 1962. He was confirmed by the United States Senate on March 16, 1962, and received his commission on March 17, 1962. He assumed senior status on December 6, 1976. While in senior status, Bonsal was a judge on the Temporary Emergency Court of Appeals from 1977 to 1987, and on the Foreign Intelligence Surveillance Court from 1981 to 1984. Bonsal remained in senior service until his death on July 22, 1995, in Bedford.

== Sources ==
Legal offices
| Preceded by Seat established by 75 Stat. 80 | Judge of the United States District Court for the Southern District of New York; 1962–1976 | Succeeded by Pierre N. Leval |
| Preceded by James Hargrove Meredith | Judge of the United States Foreign Intelligence Surveillance Court; 1981–1984 | Succeeded by Edward Devitt |
