= Daniel R. Porterfield =

American nonprofit executive, academic administrator, and government official

Dan Porterfield
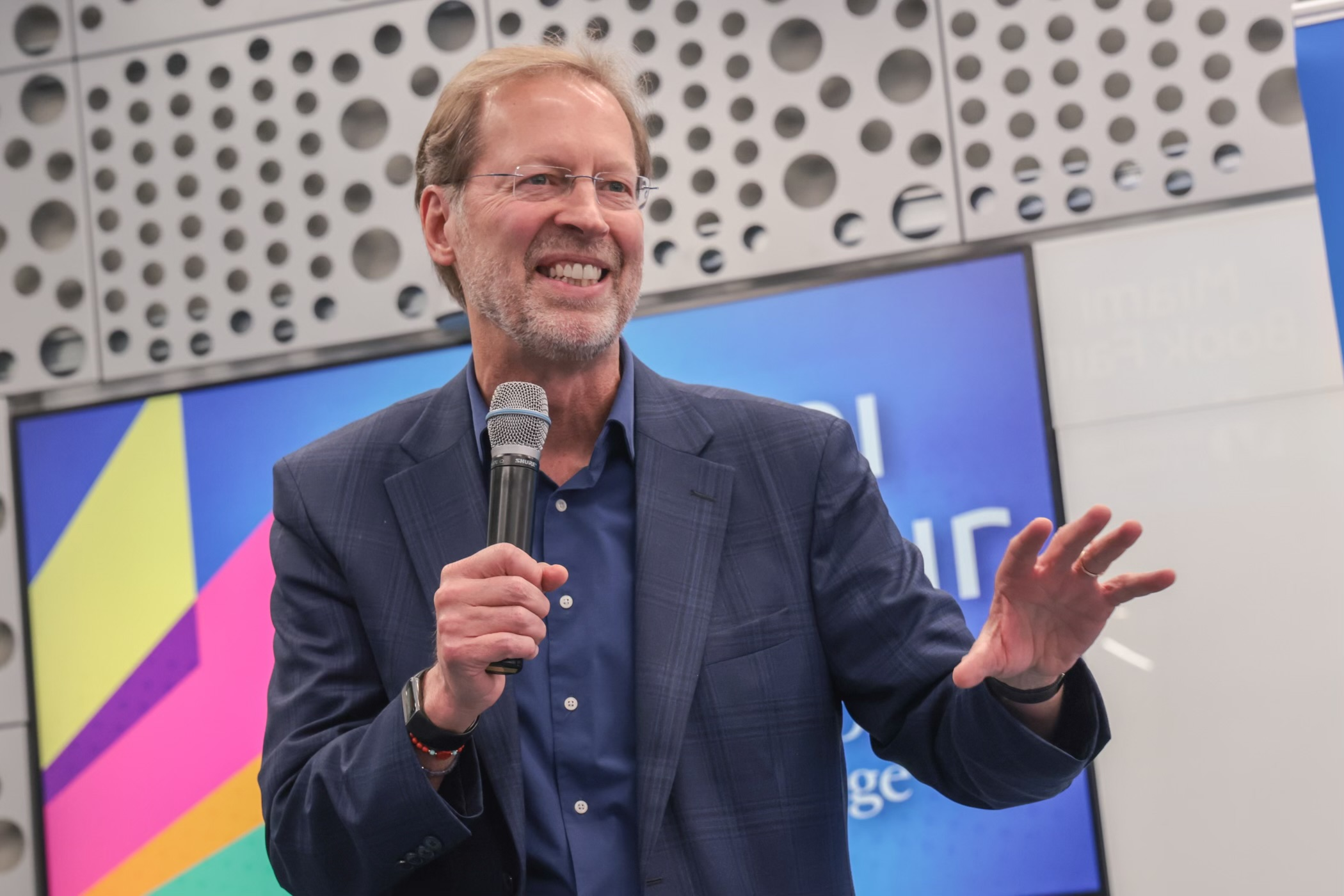

CEO of the Jack Kent Cooke Foundation
- Incumbent
- Assumed office 2026
- Preceded by: Giuseppe "Seppy" Basili

President and CEO of the Aspen Institute
- In office 2018–2026
- Preceded by: Walter Isaacson
- Succeeded by: Ángel Cabrera (academic)

15th President of Franklin & Marshall College
- In office March 1, 2011 – May 31, 2018
- Preceded by: John Burness (interim)
- Succeeded by: Barbara K. Altmann

Personal details
- Born: August 19, 1961 (age 65) Baltimore, Maryland, U.S.
- Spouse: Karen Herrling (m. 1990)
- Children: 3
- Education: Georgetown University (BA); Hertford College, Oxford (MA); City University of New York (PhD)
- Awards: Rhodes Scholar; Mellon Fellowship

Academic work
- Discipline: Literature
- Sub-discipline: Prison literature
- Institutions: Georgetown University; Franklin & Marshall College

Daniel R. Porterfield (born August 19, 1961) is an American nonprofit executive, academic administrator, government official, author, and the CEO of the Jack Kent Cooke Foundation and chair of the National Board of Directors of Teach For America. From 2018-2026 he was the president and CEO of the Aspen Institute. Porterfield previously was the 15th president of Franklin & Marshall College, senior vice president for strategic development and English professor at Georgetown University, and communications director and chief speechwriter for the U.S. Health and Human Services Secretary during the Clinton Administration. He is the author of the 2024 book Mindset Matters: The Power of College to Activate Lifelong Growth.

== Early life and education ==
A native of Baltimore, Maryland, where he was raised by a single mother, Porterfield graduated from Loyola Blakefield, a Jesuit college prep school, in 1979. In 1983, he received a Bachelor of Arts in English from Georgetown University.

As a student at Georgetown, Porterfield founded the D.C. Schools Project, through which college students tutored immigrant or first-generation children and their parents in English-language skills. He was also instrumental in creating the After School Kids program, which trains college students to tutor at-risk youth in the District of Columbia. Both programs are overseen by the Center for Social Justice Research, Teaching, and Service at Georgetown.

=== Rhodes Scholarship ===
As a Rhodes Scholar, Porterfield earned his Master of Arts from Hertford College, Oxford. He was a Mellon Fellow in the Humanities at The City University of New York Graduate Center, where he earned a PhD in 1995. His dissertation, which covered writers in captivity, received the Irving Howe Prize.

== Career ==
=== U.S. Department of Health and Human Services ===
From 1993 to 1996, Porterfield was a chief speechwriter and Deputy Assistant Secretary for Public Affairs for the United States Secretary of Health and Human Services.

=== Georgetown University ===
Georgetown University president Leo J. O'Donovan, S.J. recruited Porterfield to join the English faculty at his alma mater in 1997. He taught literature courses dealing with human rights, education, and social justice. In 2003, Porterfield received Georgetown's Dorothy Brown Award for exemplary commitment to the educational advancement of students. He subsequently received the Georgetown College Edward Bunn, S.J., Award for Faculty Excellence and the School of Foreign Service Faculty Excellence Award. In 2004 he was initiated into the Georgetown chapter of Omicron Delta Kappa.

Porterfield later was senior vice president for strategic development at Georgetown. In this role he assisted President John J. DeGioia with the development of new projects and led Georgetown's institutional positioning, communications, government relations, community relations, and intercollegiate athletics. He spearheaded Georgetown's relationship with Teach For America, the KIPP Foundation, the D.C. public schools, and the Cristo Rey Network. He also was interim director of Georgetown's NCAA Division I athletics program from June 2009 to April 2010.

=== Franklin & Marshall College ===
On November 16, 2010, the Franklin & Marshall College board of trustees announced its selection of Porterfield as the college's 15th president. Porterfield began his tenure at F&M on March 1, 2011 and was inaugurated on September 25, 2011.

In his inaugural address, titled "Kindle Fire," Porterfield spoke about the core purposes and values of a liberal arts education, the traditions of Franklin & Marshall and the power of ideas and knowledge. "It is imperative that we at F&M and all liberal arts colleges embrace the idea that we can be high-impact forces for the long-term good in the world," Porterfield said. "Liberal arts education is the single finest form of cultivating emerging human talent and character that this world has ever known."

Porterfield's strategies led F&M to enroll some of the most talented and diverse classes in its history. The percentage of incoming Pell Grant-eligible students and domestic students of color tripled during his tenure. Porterfield and F&M attributed these results to a doubling of need-based financial aid for the first-year class over that time period and to a strategy of targeted outreach to promising students in underserved communities.

As he did at Georgetown, Porterfield forged new partnerships between F&M and K-12 educators and access programs including the Posse Foundation, the KIPP Foundation, Achievement First, Uncommon Schools, Noble, College Match, College Track, the College Advising Corps and Cristo Rey Network. While at F&M, he joined the board of the College Board and chaired the board of the Lenfest Scholars Foundation, a Philadelphia-based scholarship and college access organization. He also sat on the Teach For America University Champions' Board and the College Advising Corps Advisory Board.

In 2011, Porterfield created a highly regarded pre-college summer program, F&M College Prep, to allow more than 70 rising seniors from low-income communities to spend three weeks learning from F&M faculty and current students. He also absorbed F&M's career center into a comprehensive Office of Student & Post-Graduate Development, an effort that gained national attention for its innovative approach to helping students pursue successful lives after college. Under Porterfield's leadership, F&M also set records for applications, fundraising, and fellowships; developed cutting edge new centers for student wellness and faculty excellence; constructed a new athletics stadium; and embarked upon the process of building a groundbreaking new visual arts center designed by world-renowned architect Steven Holl. Shortly after Porterfield's departure from F&M, the college announced that it faced a budget shortfall caused, at least in part, by significantly increased financial aid needed to implement his plan.

The KIPP Foundation honored Porterfield in 2012 with its "Beyond Z" award, which "celebrates members of the school community who go above and beyond for the benefit of children," and the "I Have A Dream" Foundation presented him with its Eugene M. Lang Lifetime Achievement Award in 2014. In 2016, Porterfield was named a Champion of Change for College Opportunity by the White House.

In 2013, Porterfield took part as a panelist discussing "A Path to Higher Ed" on NBC News' Education Nation, and was the only liberal arts college president invited to speak at the three White House summits focusing on college opportunity hosted by the Obama administration in 2014.

Porterfield and F&M received national recognition and visibility for their work to expand educational opportunity, including high-profile coverage in The Washington Post, The New York Times, The Philadelphia Inquirer, and The Chronicle of Higher Education, and on the PBS NewsHour. They also led the creation of the American Talent Initiative (ATI), an alliance of more than 130 top colleges and universities funded by Bloomberg Philanthropies and staffed by the Aspen Institute and the research organization Ithaka S+R committed to increasing the enrollment and graduation of high-achieving, low-income students in leading institutions.

In 2024, Porterfield authored Mindset Matters: The Power of College to Activate Lifelong Growth, in which he described the inspiring learning journeys of more than 35 F&M undergraduates that he knew and mentored during his presidency.

=== Aspen Institute ===
The Aspen Institute named Porterfield to succeed author and journalist Walter Isaacson as its next president and CEO on November 30, 2017. He assumed the position on June 1, 2018.

In one of his early public appearances as President and CEO, Porterfield described the Aspen Institute as “a force for good in communities near and far; convening thinkers and leaders; bringing into contact the very best ideas; framing and helping to solve the great difficulties of the day; confronting challenges from which others turn away; investing in leaders of every type; and always ensuring that questions of ethics and values and meaning have a prominent place in our conversations and our society.”

At the Aspen Institute, Porterfield has led an era of organizational development and growth. The Institute’s operating budget has increased from $158 million in 2018 to $316 million in 2026, and its endowment has nearly quadrupled to $466 million.

Highlights of Porterfield’s tenure include: the 2024 creation of the Institute’s Center for Rising Generations, which develops the leadership of youth and young adults, powered by a $185.7 million endowment gift from the Bezos Family Foundation; the revitalization of the Institute’s Aspen Meadows campus in Colorado, including a full hotel renovation and the creation of the Resnick Center for Herbert Bayer Studies, a $20 million gallery and learning space dedicated to the art and ideas of the Bauhaus master Herbert Bayer who was one of the Institute’s founders; and the launch of major new partnerships, including investments of nearly $40 million to foster inclusive economic growth; more than $20 million to support grassroots change-makers in dozens of communities; more than $30 million to build a network of programs serving opportunity youth; $75 million for a new initiative on gender equity and women’s professional advancement; and tens of millions of dollars for efforts to advance climate solutions, expand access to top colleges, strengthen trust across society, advance family-centered approaches to public policy, and more.

Other highlights include approval by the Institute’s Board of Trustees of a new five-year strategic plan and capital campaign; the launch of an effort to create a thriving leadership community among the tens of thousands of people worldwide who have taken part in the Institute’s programs and fellowships; the creation of the Institute’s first comprehensive action plan to enhance inclusion and belonging across the organization; the significant expansion of the Institute’s public programming, including the development of two new convening series—Aspen Ideas: Climate and Aspen Ideas: Economy; the launch of the endowed Albright International Leaders Program in honor of longtime Aspen Institute trustee Madeleine Albright, and the drafting of a new Statement of Principles expressing the Institute’s commitment to dialogue, civility, free expression, and diversity of thought.

In February 2026, Porterfield announced that he had been appointed CEO of the Jack Kent Cooke Foundation and chair of the National Board of Directors of Teach For America effective July 2026.

== Personal ==
Porterfield ias chair of the National Board of Directors of Teach For America and as a trustee of American University, and is a former trustee of the College Board, Colorado College, the Cristo Rey Network, and Jesuit Refugee Services. He was named a White House Champion of Change in 2016 and is a member of the American Academy of Arts and Sciences and the Council on Foreign Relations. He has been awarded honorary degrees from Wake Forest University, Miami Dade College, DePaul University, Allegheny College, Elizabethtown College, Queens University of Charlotte, and Mt. Aloysius College.
