= Marc Ostfield =

American academic and diplomat

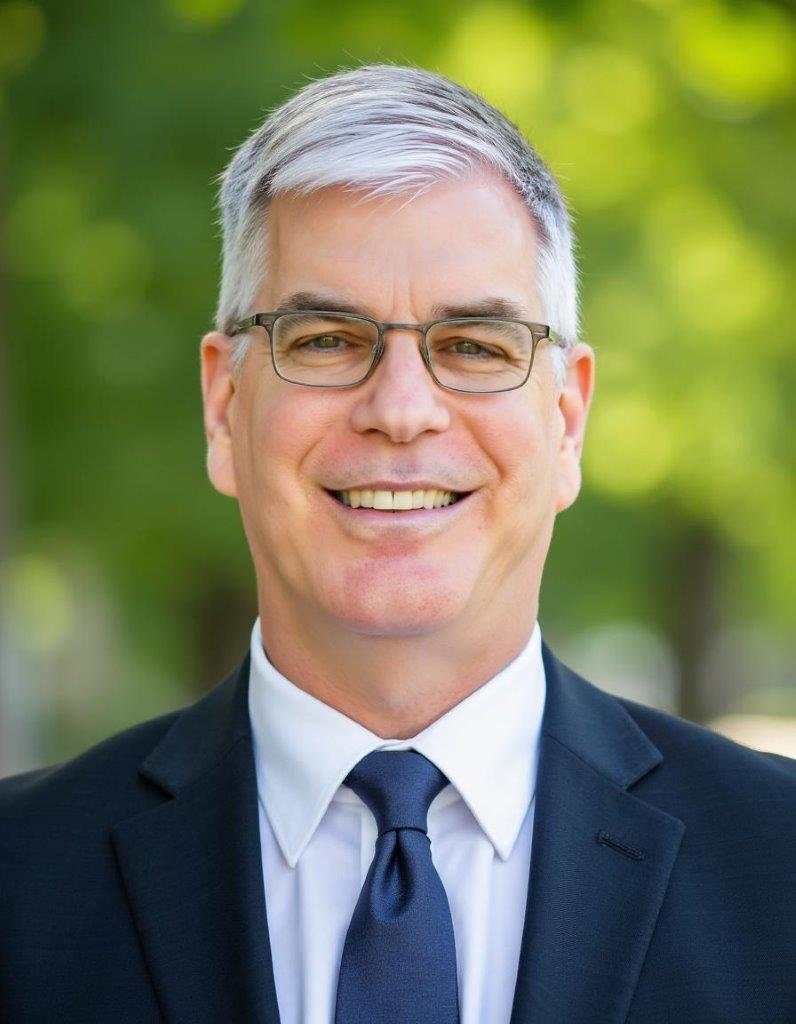

United States Ambassador to Paraguay
- In office March 9, 2022 – January 20, 2025
- President: Joe Biden; Donald Trump
- Preceded by: M. Lee McClenny
- Succeeded by: Amir Masliyah (Chargé d'affaires)

Dean of Colin Powell School for Civic and Global Leadership at The City College of New York

Incoming Dean
- Incumbent
- Assumed office January 20, 2026
- Preceded by: Andrew Rich

Personal details
- Education: University of Pennsylvania (BA, MS, PhD)

Marc Ostfield is an American academic, educator, and diplomat who served as the United States ambassador to Paraguay from 2022 to 2025 and is the incoming Richard J. Henley and Susan L. Davis Dean of the Colin Powell School for Civic and Global Leadership at the City College of New York, CUNY beginning in January 2026.

== Education ==
Ostfield earned a Bachelor of Arts in women’s studies, a Master of Science in human sexuality education, and a Doctor of Philosophy in communication from the University of Pennsylvania.

== Career ==
Ostfield began his professional career in 1987 as a curriculum supervisor at Gay Men’s Health Crisis (GMHC). From 1988 to 1989, he served as director of health education at New York University. Between 1989 and 1993, he held a director-level position at FHI 360. From 1995 to 2002, he worked as an independent consultant.

From 1987 to 2002, Ostfield designed and led large-scale, donor-funded HIV/AIDS and global health programs in the United States and internationally, including projects in Latin America, Europe, and Asia, working with agencies such as the United States Agency for International Development and the Centers for Disease Control and Prevention.

=== United States Department of State ===
Ostfield joined the United States Department of State in 2002. Over the following two decades, he served in several senior leadership roles, including senior advisor in the Office of International Health and Biodefense, where his portfolio included bioterrorism, biodefense, and global health security.

In 2009, he became a senior foreign affairs advisor in the Office of Science and Technology Cooperation. From 2009 to 2013, he served as director of the Office of Policy and Global Issues in the Bureau of European and Eurasian Affairs. From 2013 to 2017, he was deputy director of the Foreign Service Institute (FSI), responsible for the training of U.S. government foreign affairs professionals. He served as acting director of the FSI from 2017 to 2018. In 2018, Ostfield was appointed ombudsman of the Department of State.

=== Ambassador to Paraguay ===
On June 15, 2021, President Joe Biden nominated Ostfield to serve as United States ambassador to Paraguay. On June 23, 2021, his nomination was sent to the Senate. A confirmation hearing was held before the Senate Foreign Relations Committee on August 5, 2021, and his nomination was reported favorably on October 19, 2021. The Senate confirmed him by voice vote on December 18, 2021.

Ostfield presented his credentials to Paraguayan President Mario Abdo Benítez on March 9, 2022. He served as ambassador until January 2025. During his tenure, he oversaw all bilateral relations between the United States and Paraguay, managed a staff of approximately 230 personnel across six U.S. government agencies, and administered an operating budget of approximately $20 million. His work included efforts to support Paraguayan institutions focused on the rule of law and anti-corruption initiatives, overseeing the completion of a new U.S. embassy compound in Asunción, and facilitating the resumption of Paraguayan beef exports to the United States after a multi-year suspension.

In August 2024, the government of Paraguay requested Ostfield’s departure following the United States’ imposition of sanctions against Tabacalera del Este and several other firms for supporting the illicit enrichment of former Paraguayan president Horacio Cartes.

=== Dean of the Colin Powell School for Civic and Global Leadership ===
In January 2026, Ostfield becomes the Richard J. Henley and Susan L. Davis Dean of the Colin Powell School for Civic and Global Leadership at the City College of New York (CUNY). He was selected following a national search that attracted more than 100 applicants.

As dean, Ostfield leads the School’s academic, research, and public engagement mission, with a focus on civic leadership, public service, and global affairs. He succeeds Andrew Rich, who now serves as president of Franklin & Marshall College.

== Honors and awards ==
He has received numerous professional, academic, and community service honors, including the Presidential Rank Award; the U.S. National Counterterrorism Center’s Meritorious Unit Citation; multiple U.S. Department of State Superior Honor and Meritorious Honor Awards; the Diplomacy Fellowship from the American Association for the Advancement of Science; the Jacob K. Javits Fellowship from the U.S. Department of Education; and the President’s Volunteer Service Award as a volunteer firefighter since 1995.

== Scholarship and Research ==
Ostfield is an accomplished researcher who has published and presented extensively on foreign policy, national security, and global health. His academic interests include group dynamics, organizational behavior, negotiation, and leadership.

== Publications ==
Ostfield, M. (2009). Pathogen Security: The Illusion of Security in Foreign Policy and Biodefense. International Journal of Risk Assessment and Management, Vol. 12.

Ostfield, M. (2008). Strengthening Biodefense Internationally: Illusion and Reality. Biosecurity and Bioterrorism, Vol.6, No.3, 261-268.

Ostfield, M. (2007). Biodefense: U.S. Vision of Broader Cooperation. European Affairs, Volume 8, Number 1.

Ostfield, M. (2004). Bioterrorism as a Foreign Policy Issue. The SAIS Review of International Affairs, Vol. 24, Number 1, 131-146.

Ostfield, M. & Jehn, K.E. (1999). Personal Revelation and Conflict in Organizational Settings. Research on Negotiation in Organizations, Vol. 7.

== Personal life ==
Ostfield speaks French, Spanish, Portuguese, and Arabic.

Diplomatic posts
| Preceded by M. Lee McClenny | United States ambassador to Paraguay; 2022–present | Incumbent |
