= Walter C. Ploeser =

American politician

Walter Christian Ploeser

Member of the U.S. House of Representatives from Missouri's 12th district
- In office 3 January 1941 – 3 January 1949
- Preceded by: Charles Arthur Anderson
- Succeeded by: Raymond W. Karst

United States Ambassador to Paraguay
- In office 6 November 1957 – 12 September 1959
- President: Dwight D. Eisenhower
- Preceded by: Arthur A. Ageton
- Succeeded by: Harry F. Stimpson, Jr.

United States Ambassador to Costa Rica
- In office April 27, 1970 – April 13, 1972
- President: Richard Nixon
- Preceded by: Clarence A. Boonstra
- Succeeded by: Viron P. Vaky

Member of the Missouri House of Representatives
- In office 1931–1932

Personal details
- Born: January 7, 1907 St. Louis, Missouri, U.S.
- Died: November 17, 1993 (aged 86) St. Louis, Missouri, U.S.
- Party: Republican
- Spouse: Dorothy Mohrig

Walter Christian Ploeser (January 7, 1907 – November 17, 1993) was a U.S. representative from Missouri and United States Ambassador to Paraguay and Costa Rica.

Born in St. Louis, Missouri, Ploeser attended the public schools of St. Louis, Missouri, Casper and Lusk, Wyoming, and the City College of Law and Finance, St. Louis, Missouri. He engaged in the insurance business in St. Louis, Missouri, in 1922 and founded his own company in 1933. Organizer and chairman of the board of Marine Underwriters Corp. 1935. He served in the State house of representatives in 1931 and 1932.

Ploeser was elected as a Republican to the Seventy-seventh and to the three succeeding Congresses (January 3, 1941 – January 3, 1949). He served as chairman of the Select Committee on Small Business (Eightieth Congress). He was an unsuccessful candidate for reelection in 1948 to the Eighty-first Congress. He served as delegate, 1964 and 1968 Republican National Conventions. He resumed the insurance business. He served as director of Webster Groves Trust Company. Ambassador to Paraguay in 1957–1959. He served as chairman of board, The Salvation Army from 1967 to 1969. Ambassador to Costa Rica in 1970–1972. He was a resident of St. Louis, Missouri, until his death on November 17, 1993.

U.S. House of Representatives
Preceded by Charles Arthur Anderson	Member of the U.S. House of Representatives from Missouri's 12th congressional district 1941–1949	Succeeded by Raymond W. Karst
Diplomatic posts
Preceded by Arthur A. Ageton	United States Ambassador to Paraguay; 6 November 1957 – 12 September 1959	Succeeded by Harry F. Stimpson, Jr.
Preceded by Clarence A. Boonstra	United States Ambassador to Costa Rica; April 27, 1970 – April 13, 1972	Succeeded by Viron P. Vaky
