= William R. Finch =

American diplomat

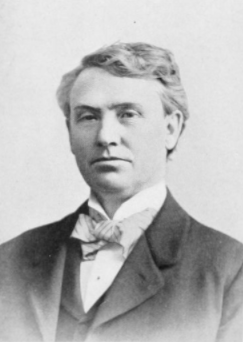
- Born: William Rufus Finch; December 14, 1847; Walworth County, Wisconsin
- Died: August 9, 1913 (aged 65); La Crosse, Wisconsin
- Occupation: Diplomat
- Spouse: Lillie Martinette Law (m. 1897)

William Rufus Finch (December 14, 1847 – August 9, 1913) was a United States diplomat.

== Biography ==
William R. Finch was born to John Reynolds and Lydia Ann Finch (née Rogers) in Walworth County, Wisconsin on December 14, 1847. On November 2, 1897, he married Lillie Martinette Law, and they had two children.

He died in La Crosse, Wisconsin on August 9, 1913.

== Career ==
Finch served as U.S. Minister to Paraguay and Uruguay from 1898 to 1905. While in office, he gained permission from Paraguay to use their offices during the American occupation of Cuba.

== See also ==
- United States Ambassador to Paraguay
- United States Ambassador to Uruguay
