= James Caldwell Cason =

American diplomat (born 1944)

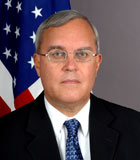

Mayor of Coral Gables, Florida
- In office January 20, 2011 – April 15, 2017
- Preceded by: Don Slesnick
- Succeeded by: Raul Valdes-Fauli

United States Ambassador to Paraguay
- In office February 1, 2006 – August 2, 2008
- President: George W. Bush
- Preceded by: John F. Keane
- Succeeded by: Liliana Ayalde

11th Chief of the U.S. Interests Section in Cuba
- In office September 10, 2002 – September 10, 2005
- President: George W. Bush
- Preceded by: Vicki J. Huddleston
- Succeeded by: Michael E. Parmly

Personal details
- Born: James Caldwell Cason; November 14, 1944 (age 81) Atlantic City, New Jersey, U.S.
- Party: Republican
- Spouse: Carmen Cason
- Profession: U.S. Foreign Service officer Diplomat

For the American football player, see Jim Cason

James Caldwell Cason (born November 14, 1944) is a retired United States Foreign Service officer, most recently serving as Ambassador to Paraguay, a post he held from 2006 to 2008. Prior to that post, he was the Principal Officer of the US Interests Section in Havana (2002–2005). On January 20, 2011, he became the new mayor of Coral Gables, Florida.

== Background ==
Cason graduated from Dartmouth College in 1966 and has an M.A. from the School of Advanced International Studies (SAIS), Johns Hopkins University (JHU).

== Career ==
Prior to assuming his post as United States Ambassador to Paraguay, he served as the chief of the United States Interests Section in Havana, Cuba, from September 10, 2002 to September 10, 2005. He was succeeded by Michael E. Parmly. Cuban media broadcast a series of satirical animations poking fun at Cason known as Cabo Cason.

Cason also served as Deputy Chief of Mission at the U.S. Embassy in Tegucigalpa, Honduras, and Kingston, Jamaica. Previously he served as Political Advisor to the Commander of the U.S. Atlantic Command (USACOM) and to NATO's Supreme Allied Commander Atlantic (SACLANT). Cason also served at U.S. missions in Milan, Italy; Lisbon, Portugal; San Salvador, El Salvador; Panama City, Panama; Maracaibo, Venezuela; Montevideo, Uruguay; and La Paz, Bolivia.

== Cuban dissidents ==
A group of 735 Cuban dissidents (some connected with the Varela Project) were arrested by the Cuban government and accused of accepting gifts (including cash as well as office machines and office space) from Cason and the US Interests Section. Their arrests coincided with the onset of the 2003 invasion of Iraq in March 2003. An exhibit (billboard) was erected by the United States Interests Section in Havana on September 8, 2005, in protest of the incarcerations. A number of the dissidents were subsequently released, but most of the individuals remained imprisoned until 2010.

== Guarani music ==
While posted in Paraguay, Cason learned the Guaraní language, a language spoken by 94% of the people of that country and in 2008, recorded an album, "Campo Jurado" ("The Field of Promises"), in which he sings folk songs in Guaraní.

== See also ==
- Cuba-United States relations
- Varela Project

Diplomatic posts
Preceded by John F. Keane	United States Ambassador to Paraguay; 2006–2008	Succeeded by Liliana Ayalde
