= Timothy Lathrop Towell =

American diplomat and businessman

Timothy Lathrop Towell (born 1934) is a former American Ambassador to Paraguay (1988–1991) and the President, Founder, and Chief Executive Officer The Foreign Policy Group. He was also the U.S. Consul in Cochabamba, Bolivia.

There have been reports that Juan Carlos Wasmosy, the former President of Paraguay, paid Towell's firm almost $300,000 for work in 1997 and 1998. It was also reported that in 1997 the State Department wanted him to register as a foreign agent.

Towell, a Cleveland native, earned a Bachelor of Arts in Political Science at Yale University in 1957 and a Master of Arts in European History from Case-Western Reserve University in 1962. Towell had several careers before working for the State Department including banking and working as an elementary school teacher.
