= Barbara K. Altmann =

Canadian academic and college administrator

16th President of Franklin & Marshall College
- In office 2018 – July 2025
- Preceded by: Daniel R. Porterfield
- Succeeded by: Andrew Rich

Personal details
- Born: January 31, 1957 (age 69) Edmonton, Alberta, Canada
- Children: 2
- Education: University of Alberta (BA); University of Toronto (MA, PhD)
- Occupation: College administrator French professor

Academic background
- Thesis: Christine de Pizan's "Livre du dit de Poissy": An Analysis and Critical Edition (1988)

Academic work
- Discipline: French studies
- Institutions: Bucknell University; Franklin & Marshall College; University of Oregon

Barbara Kismet Altmann (born January 31, 1957) is a Canadian academic and college administrator. She served as the 16th president of Franklin & Marshall College from 2018 until July 2025. Altmann was the first female president of F&M. Before F&M, Altmann was the provost of Bucknell University.

== Early life and education ==
Altmann was born and raised in Edmonton, Alberta. She is the child of German immigrants and was a first-generation college student. Altmann earned a B.A. in romance languages from University of Alberta. She completed a M.A. and Ph.D. in medieval French language and literature from University of Toronto in 1988. Altmann also played basketball as an undergraduate.

== Career ==
She was on the faculty at University of Oregon for over two decades. In her last three years, she was the senior vice provost for academic affairs. In 2015, she joined Bucknell University as a provost and professor of French. She became the 16th president of Franklin & Marshall College in 2018, succeeding Daniel R. Porterfield and interim president Eric Noll. Altmann is the first female president of the college.

Altmann retired at the end of the 2024–25 school year, to be succeeded by Dr. Andrew Rich on July 12, 2025.

== Personal life ==
As of 2018, Altmann has resided in the United States for almost 30 years and is a permanent resident. She maintains her Canadian citizenship. Altmann married John T. Stacey, a psychologist, and has two sons. Her brother has a Ph.D. in artificial intelligence, and her sister "has a doctorate in library science."

== See also ==
- List of women presidents or chancellors of co-ed colleges and universities
