= C. Arthur Anderson =

American politician (1899–1977)

Member of the U.S. House of Representatives from Missouri's 12th district
- In office January 3, 1937 – January 3, 1941
- Preceded by: James R. Claiborne
- Succeeded by: Walter C. Ploeser

Personal details
- Born: Charles Arthur Anderson; September 26, 1899 St. Louis, Missouri, U.S.
- Died: April 26, 1977 (aged 77) St. Louis, Missouri, U.S.
- Resting place: Sunset Burial Park
- Party: Democratic

Charles Arthur Anderson (September 26, 1899 – April 26, 1977) was a U.S. representative from Missouri.

Born in St. Louis, Missouri, Anderson attended the public schools. He graduated from St. Charles Military Academy in 1916 and from the law school of St. Louis University, LL.B., 1924 where he received his Masters of Jurisprudence Degree. During the First World War, he served in the 128th Field Artillery Regiment, 35th Division, under Harry Truman, from April 1, 1917, to July 2, 1919, with nineteen months service overseas. He was admitted to the bar in 1924 and commenced practice in St. Louis, Missouri. C. Arthur Anderson married Dorothy Johnson in 1929. They had seven children: Charles Arthur Anderson, Donald Edward Anderson, David Owen Anderson, Mary Adelle Anderson, Robert Klenfelter Anderson, Roger Duncan Anderson, and Thomas Eugene Anderson. He served as prosecuting attorney of St. Louis County in 1933–1937. He prosecuted the famous Kelley Kidnapping Case in 1934 and 1935. On October 9, 1934, he was driving home after the trial and "some gangsters" ran his car off the road. C. Arthur suffered a compound fracture in his right leg and later developed an infection. This forced him to use a cane for the rest of his life.

Anderson was elected as a Democrat to the Seventy-fifth and to the Seventy-sixth Congresses (January 3, 1937 – January 3, 1941). He was an unsuccessful candidate for reelection in 1940 to the Seventy-seventh Congress. He served as chairman of the Democratic State convention at St. Louis in 1940. He resumed the practice of law in St. Louis, Missouri, where he died April 26, 1977. He was interred in Sunset Burial Park.

U.S. House of Representatives
Preceded by James R. Claiborne	Member of the U.S. House of Representatives from Missouri's 12th congressional district 1937–1941	Succeeded by Walter C. Ploeser
