= Andrew Rich =

American political scientist and president of Franklin & Marshall College

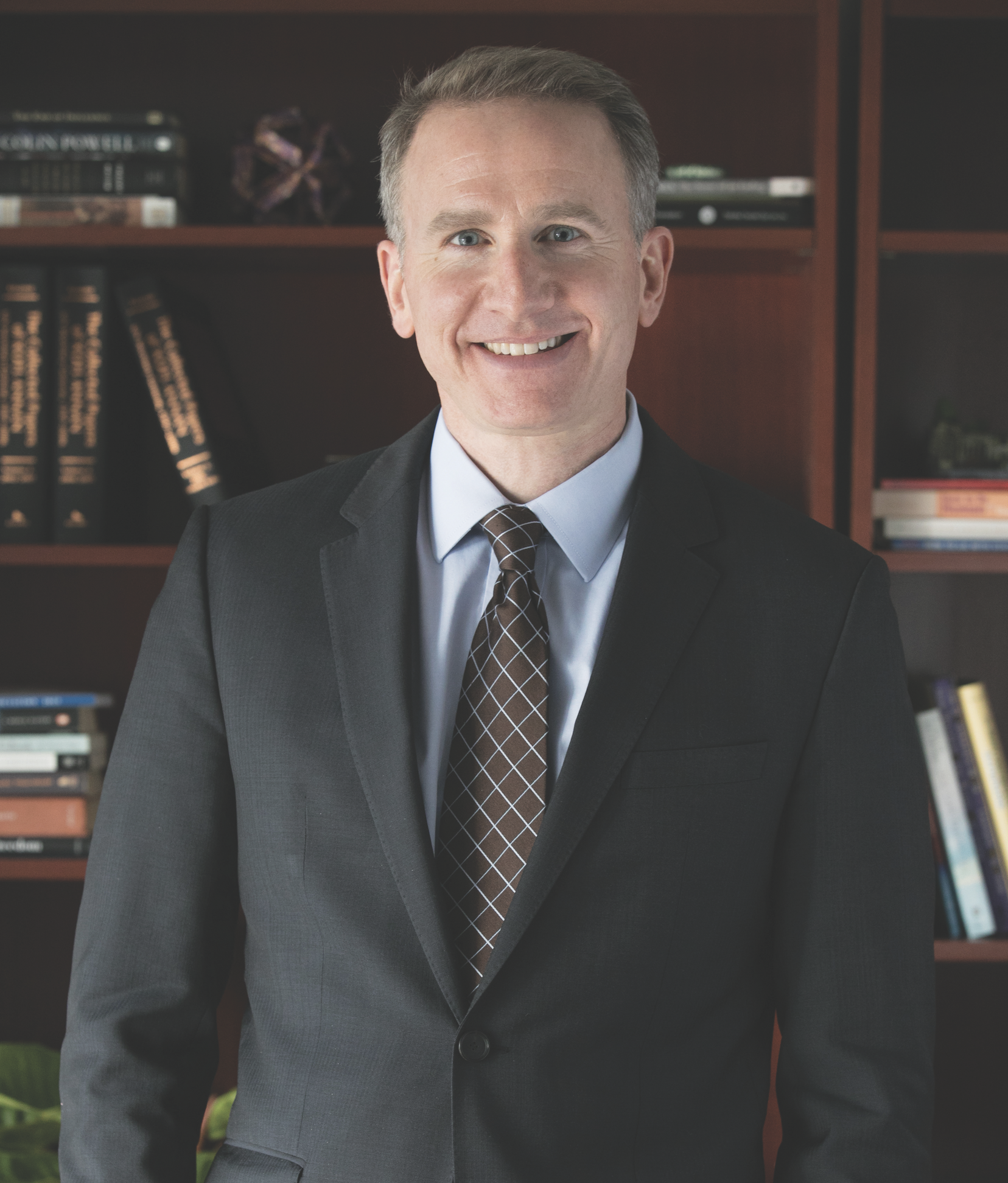
- City College of New York official portrait

17th President of Franklin & Marshall College
- Incumbent
- Assumed office July 12, 2025
- Preceded by: Barbara K. Altmann

CEO of the Truman Foundation
- In office 2011-2019

President and CEO of the Roosevelt Institute
- In office 2009-2011

Dean of the Colin Powell School
- In office Jan 2019 - June 2025

Personal details
- Spouse: Joel Allen
- Education: University of Richmond (BA); Yale University (PhD)
- Occupation: College administrator Political scientist Professor
- Awards: Truman Scholar

Academic background
- Thesis: Think Tanks, Public Policy, and the Politics of Expertise (1999)

Academic work
- Discipline: Political science
- Sub-discipline: Socioeconomics; Institutional politics
- Institutions: City College of New York; Franklin & Marshall College; Wake Forest University

Andrew Owen Rich is an American political scientist, academic, and college administrator. Rich served as Dean of the Colin Powell School for Civic and Global Leadership from February 2019 until becoming the 17th President of Franklin & Marshall College in July 2025.

== Early life and education ==
Andrew Rich is a native of Delaware.

=== Education ===
Rich graduated from the University of Richmond in 1992 with a Bachelor of Arts in political science. In 1991, Rich received a Harry S. Truman Scholarship.

After graduating from Richmond, Rich received his doctorate in political science from Yale University in 1999. While at Yale, Rich was a union organizer in the Graduate Student and Employees Organization (GESO). During a teaching assistants'"grade strike" in 1995, Rich advocated that graduate students withhold the students' papers and materials from the faculty member teaching the course. His dissertation was entitled Think Tanks, Public Policy, and the Politics of Expertise.

Rich later published Think Tanks, Public Policy, and the Politics of Expertise through Cambridge University Press in 2004.

== Career ==
After graduating from Yale, Rich was a professor at Wake Forest University from 1999 to 2003. He served as Dean of the Colin Powell School for Civic and Global Leadership at the City College of New York (CCNY) from February 2019 to July 2025, until becoming the 17th President of Franklin & Marshall College in July 2025.

=== Roosvelt Institute ===
Rich was President and CEO of the Roosevelt Institute (2009–2011), where he launched the Four Freedoms Center and expanded the Institute Campus Network to over 125 colleges, engaging thousands of students in public policy and leadership programs.

=== Truman Foundation ===
Andrew Rich served as Executive Secretary of the Truman Scholarship Foundation from 2011 to 2019. In this role, he oversaw the federal agency that awards merit-based Truman Scholarships to college students pursuing graduate study for public service careers, managing a nationwide selection process and providing leadership training, career counseling, and community-building programs for Truman Scholars.

=== Colin Powell School for Civic and Global Leadership at The city College of New York ===
Dean Rich began his academic career as an Assistant Professor of Political Science at Wake Forest University in 1999 before joining the Political Science Department at City College in 2003. After holding several leadership roles within the Colin Powell School, he left City College in 2009 to serve as President and CEO of the Roosevelt Institute, and in 2011 became CEO and Executive Secretary of the Harry S. Truman Scholarship Foundation, where he continues to serve as Chairman of the Board of Directors of Friends of the Truman Foundation. In early 2019, Rich returned to City College as Dean of the Colin Powell School for Civic and Global Leadership.

During his six-year tenure, the School experienced significant growth, becoming the largest undergraduate division at the College by number of majors. He led a fundraising campaign that secured over $85 million in pledges and gifts since 2020, supporting new faculty hires and programs such as Leadership for Democracy and Social Justice and the Moynihan Center. Most recently, he oversaw the creation of the Social Mobility Lab at CCNY, dedicated to understanding pathways to social mobility.

Under Dean Rich's leadership, the Colin Powell School strengthened as a resilient and dynamic division, advancing City College's mission while supporting students, faculty, and the broader community.

=== Franklin & Marshall College ===
In February 2025, the Franklin & Marshall College Board of Trustees announced Rich would succeed retiring president Barbara K. Altmann, who served in the role since 2018. Rich took office as the 17th president of Franklin & Marshall on July 12, 2025.

After taking office, Rich met with students, highlighting the "quality of education" as a priority for his administration.

== Personal life ==
Rich has been married to his husband, Joel, for 30 years. Joel Allen is a professor of history and classics at the City University of New York.
