= Raymond W. Karst =

American politician and lawyer (1902–1987)

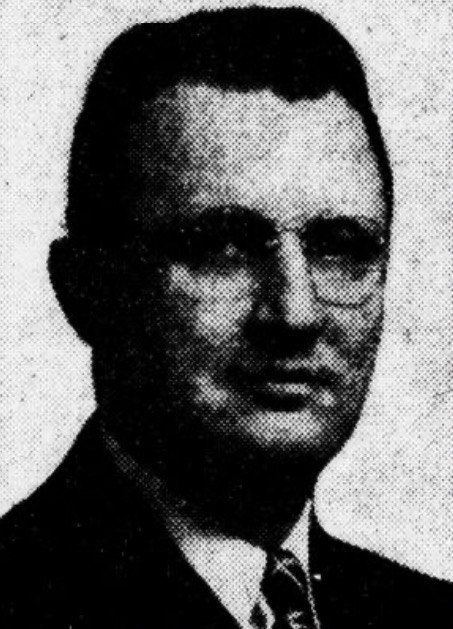

Member of the U.S. House of Representatives from Missouri's 12th district
- In office January 3, 1949 – January 3, 1951
- Preceded by: Walter C. Ploeser
- Succeeded by: Thomas B. Curtis

Member of the Missouri House of Representatives from the St. Louis City 3rd district
- In office 1935–1936

Personal details
- Born: Raymond Willard Karst; December 31, 1902 St. Louis, Missouri, US
- Died: October 4, 1987 (aged 84) Kirkwood, Missouri, US
- Resting place: Calvary Cemetery
- Party: Democratic
- Occupation: Politician, lawyer

Military service
- Allegiance: United States
- Branch/service: United States Army Ordnance Corps
- Years of service: 1942–1945
- Rank: Captain
- Battles/wars: World War II

Raymond Willard Karst (December 31, 1902 – October 4, 1987) was an American politician and lawyer. A Democrat, he was a member of the United States House of Representatives from Missouri.

== Biography ==
Karst was born on December 31, 1902, in St. Louis, the son of Edgar Taylor Karst and Maymee Josephine (née Kennedy) Karst. Educated at Wyman grade school and St. Louis Academy, he graduated from the Saint Louis University School of Law in 1927, with a Bachelor of Laws. In 1926, he was admitted to the bar, after which he began practicing law in St. Louis.

From 1936 to 1940, Karst was a St. Louis provisional judge, as well as judge of the St. Louis Court of Criminal Correction. He also worked in construction and real estate. During World War II, from 1942 to 1945, he was a captain in the United States Army Ordnance Corps. He lived in Frontenac.

Karst was a Democrat. In 1935 and 1936, he represented the St. Louis City 3rd District in the Missouri House of Representatives. He was a member of the United States House of Representatives, from January 3, 1949, to January 3, 1951, representing Missouri's 12th district. He lost the following election. In 1963, he unsuccessfully ran for the Missouri Senate. Ideologically, he was liberal. He supported lower taxes, a harsher policy against drunk driving, and the end of billboards.

After serving in Congress, Karst joined the general counsel of the Economic Stabilization Agency. He returned to practicing law in 1955, in Clayton. He was later chairman of the board for Karst Enterprises.

On July 25, in either 1934 or 1936, Karst married Erma May Meier, with whom he had three children. He was Catholic, as well as a member of the American Legion and the Knights of Columbus. He later moved to Kirkwood, dying there on October 4, 1987, aged 84, while undergoing treatment for respiratory disease. He was buried at the Calvary Cemetery. An archive of his papers is unrealized.

U.S. House of Representatives
Preceded by Walter C. Ploeser	Member of the U.S. House of Representatives from Missouri's 12th congressional district 1949–1951	Succeeded by Thomas B. Curtis
