= Christopher Landau =

American lawyer and diplomat (born 1963)

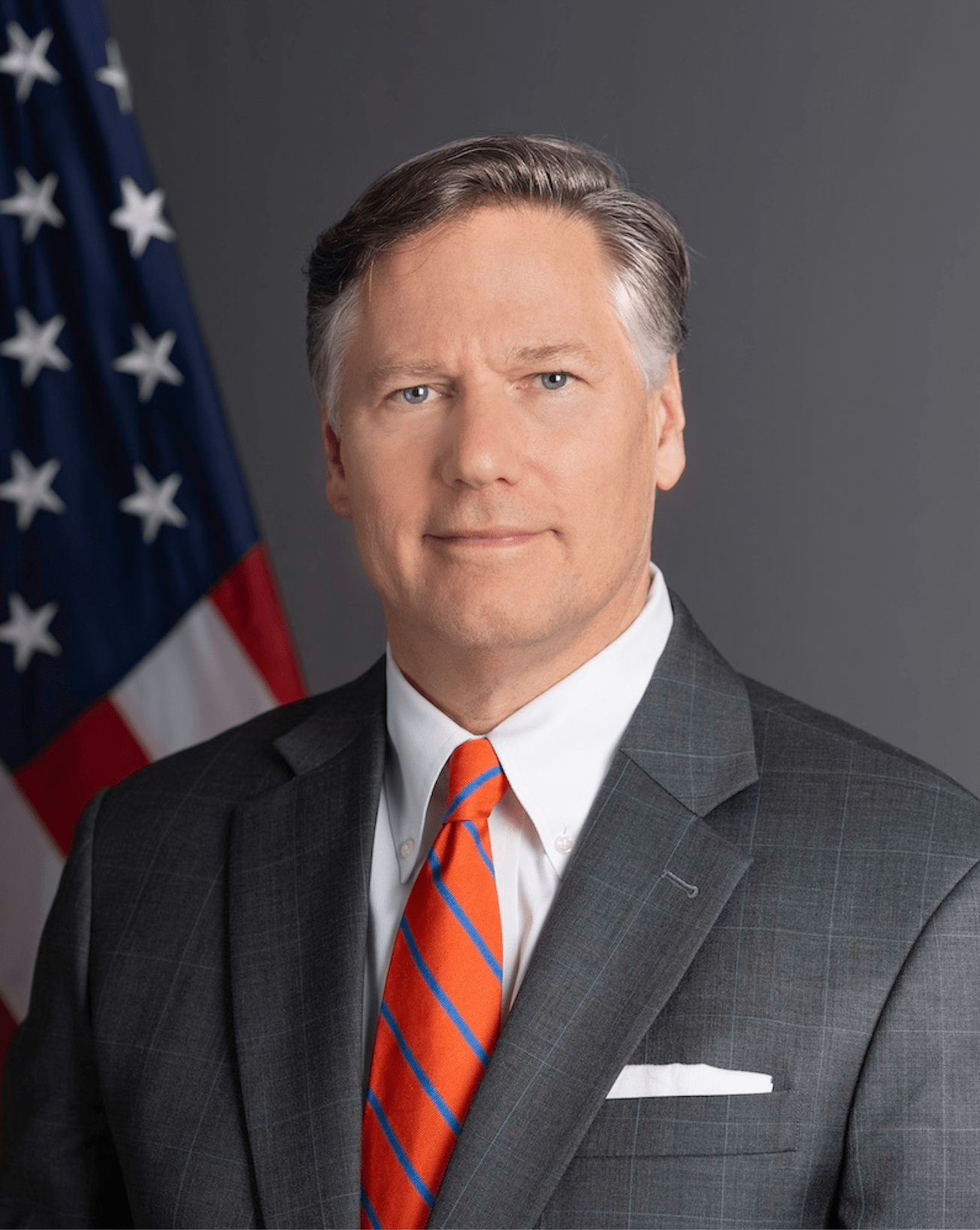
- Official portrait, 2025

23rd United States Deputy Secretary of State
- Incumbent
- Assumed office March 25, 2025
- President: Donald Trump
- Secretary: Marco Rubio
- Preceded by: Kurt M. Campbell

United States Ambassador to Mexico
- In office August 12, 2019 – January 20, 2021
- President: Donald Trump
- Preceded by: Roberta S. Jacobson
- Succeeded by: Ken Salazar

Personal details
- Born: Christopher Thomas Landau; November 13, 1963 (age 63) Madrid, Spanish State
- Party: Republican
- Spouse: Caroline Bruce (m. 1997)
- Relations: Sigalit Landau (cousin)
- Children: 2
- Parent: George W. Landau (father)
- Education: Harvard University (BA, JD)

Christopher Thomas Landau (born November 13, 1963) is an American lawyer and diplomat serving as the United States deputy secretary of state since 2025. He previously served as the United States ambassador to Mexico from 2019 to 2021.

Landau studied law at Harvard University. After graduation, he clerked for conservative U.S. Supreme Court justices Antonin Scalia and Clarence Thomas. In private practice at Kirkland & Ellis, he argued nine cases before the Court over a period of 11 years.

In December 2024, President-elect Trump nominated Landau to serve as deputy secretary of state in his second administration.

== Early life and education ==
Christopher Thomas Landau was born on November 13, 1963, in Madrid, Spanish State, where his father, George W. Landau (later United States ambassador to Paraguay, Chile, and Venezuela), was then stationed with the United States Foreign Service.

Landau attended the American School of Asunción, Paraguay, for five years. He is fluent in Spanish and French.

Landau graduated from Groton School in Groton, Massachusetts, in 1981. He earned his BA in history, summa cum laude, from Harvard College in 1985, where he was elected to Phi Beta Kappa his junior year and earned a certificate in Latin American studies. He wrote his senior thesis on U.S. relations with Venezuela's first freely elected president, Rómulo Gallegos. He received his JD, magna cum laude, from Harvard Law School in 1989, where he was articles co-chair of the Harvard Law Review.

== Legal career ==
After graduating from law school, Landau clerked for Judge Clarence Thomas of the United States Court of Appeals for the District of Columbia Circuit. He later clerked for Thomas again in 1990 to 1991 after Thomas was appointed to the U.S. Supreme Court and then Justice Antonin Scalia in 1991–92. During the former clerkship, Landau was co-clerk with Lawrence Lessig; during the latter clerkship, he was co-clerk with Gregory G. Katsas, Gregory E. Maggs, and Stephen R. McAllister.

In 1993, Landau joined Kirkland & Ellis as an associate, becoming a partner in 1995. He was chairman of the firm's appellate practice until he left after twenty-five years to join Quinn Emanuel Urquhart & Sullivan in 2018. Between 2005 and 2016, he argued nine cases before the Supreme Court, most of which dealt with arbitration or bankruptcy.

From 1994 to 1995, Landau was an adjunct professor of administrative law at the Georgetown University Law Center. In 2017, the chief justice of the United States appointed him to the advisory committee on the Federal Rules of Appellate Procedure. Landau served as a trustee of the United States Supreme Court Historical Society, and chair of the society's Programs Committee. He was also a director of the Diplomacy Center Foundation, which supports the United States Diplomacy Center at the United States Department of State.

=== Cases argued before the U.S. Supreme Court ===
- Buckeye Check Cashing, Inc. v. Cardegna Won affirmance for petitioner that challenges to validity of arbitration clauses must be heard by the arbitrator in first instance (2005)
- Shady Grove Orthopedic Associates, P.A. v. Allstate Insurance Co. Won affirmance for respondent that state civil procedure rules cannot apply to state-law cases heard in federal courts (2009)
- Credit Suisse Securities LLC v. Simmonds (2011) Court held with respondent that accrual date for suits under Securities Exchange Act is when profit is realized, not when statement is issued.
- Puerto Rico v. Sanchez Valle (2016) Court held with respondents that dual sovereignty does not apply to Puerto Rico for double jeopardy purposes.
- Puerto Rico v. Franklin California Tax-Free Trust (2016) Won affirmance for petitioner that federal bankruptcy law pre-empts territorial statute allowing utilities to restructure their debt.
- DIRECTV, Inc. v. Imburgia (2016) Won affirmance for petitioner that Federal Arbitration Act pre-empts state law without explicit reference to invalid state law.
- Perry v. Merit Systems Protection Board (2016) Won affirmance for petitioner that MPSB decisions disposing of claims on jurisdictional grounds are reviewable in federal court
- Maslenjak v. United States (2016) Won affirmance for petitioner that false statements on a naturalization application must be material to the application to sustain a conviction for naturalization fraud.
- Czyzewski v. Jevic Holding Corp. (2016) Court held for petitioners that bankruptcy settlement proceeds cannot deviate from priority distribution mandated in the Bankruptcy Code without the consent of the affected creditors.

== Diplomatic career ==
=== United States ambassador to Mexico ===
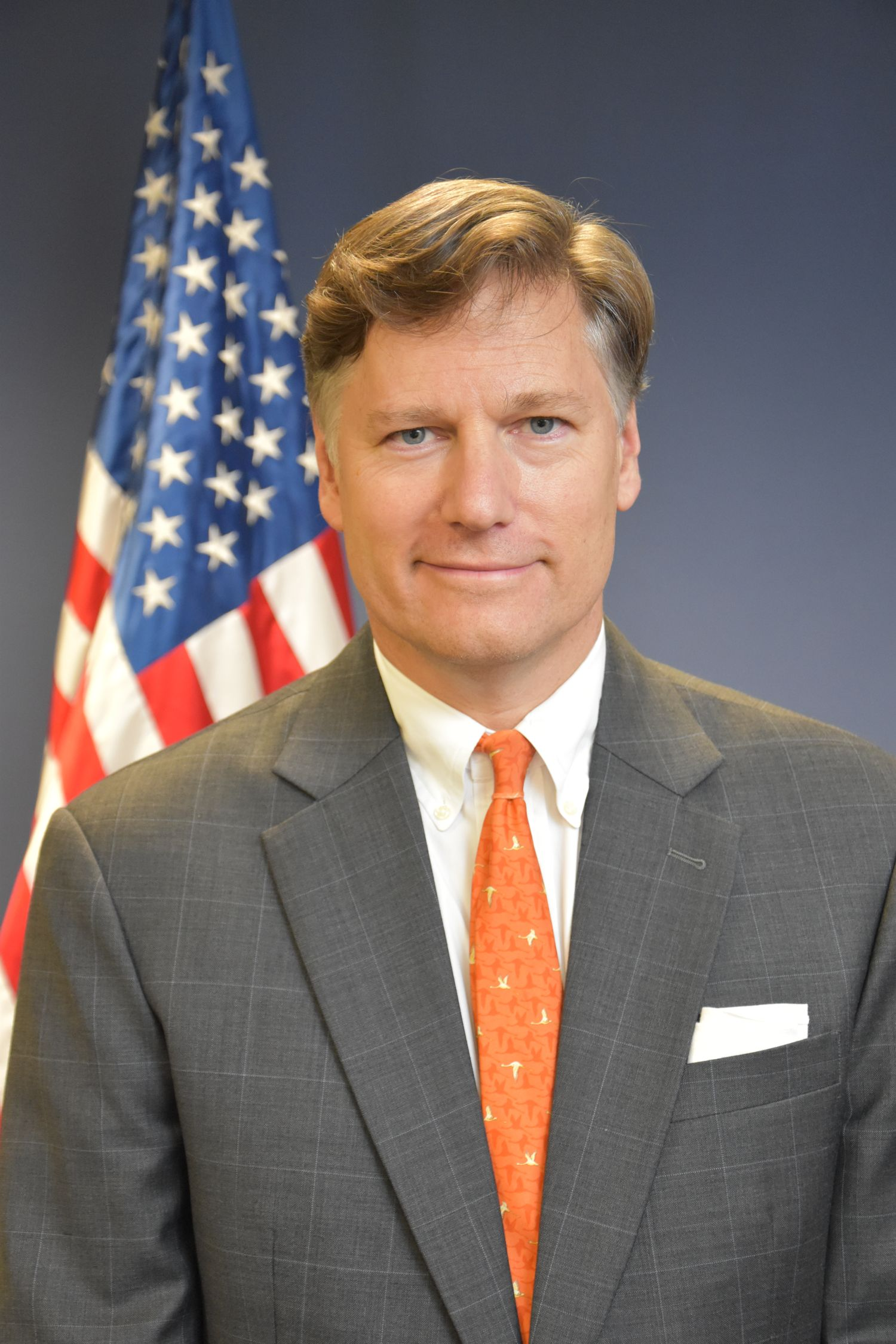
Official portrait as ambassador to Mexico

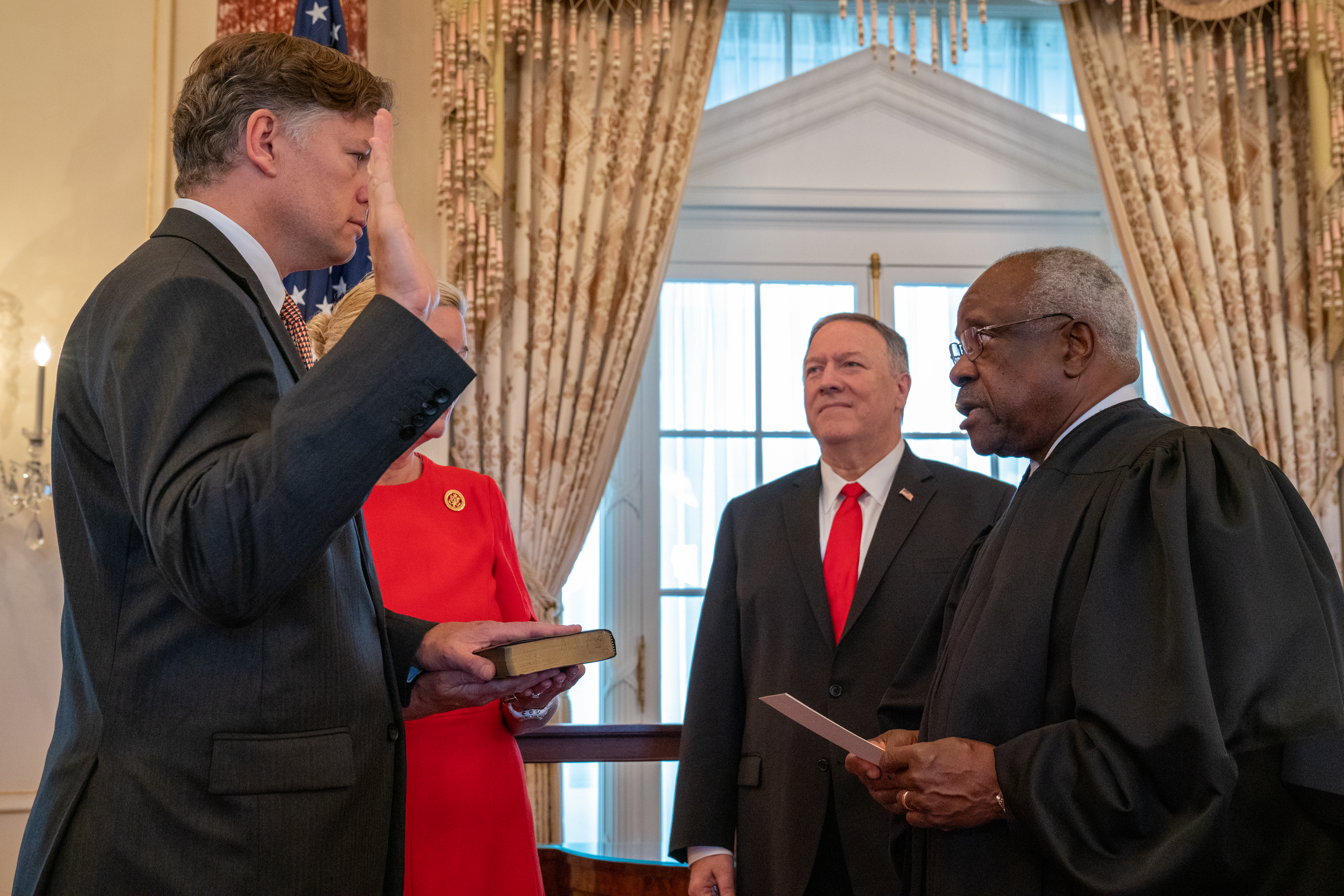
Landau being sworn in as ambassador to Mexico by Justice Clarence Thomas, with U.S. Secretary of State Mike Pompeo looking on

On March 26, 2019, President Donald Trump nominated Landau as United States ambassador to Mexico. On August 1, 2019, the Senate unanimously confirmed his nomination by voice vote. He was sworn into office on August 12, 2019, arrived in Mexico on August 16, 2019, and presented his credentials to President Andrés Manuel López Obrador on August 26, 2019. As Ambassador, Landau made the issue of immigration a top policy priority.

On September 9, 2020, President Trump added Landau to a list of potential nominees to the Supreme Court of the United States. After Joe Biden succeeded Trump as President, Landau left his post as ambassador in 2021, and was replaced by former U.S. Senator from Colorado Ken Salazar.

==== Social media usage ====
As ambassador to Mexico, Landau was noted for his heavy usage of social media. In 2020, he launched a challenge on Twitter to boost his follower count in order to exceed the 150,000 followers boasted by the ambassador to Greece Geoffrey R. Pyatt, noting his follower count was only 40,000 despite Mexico's much larger population. Landau tweeted in Spanish "This is an outrage! … Mexico has to be #1!" By July 2020, Landau's follower count had exploded to 245,000, in what Slate described as providing "an unexpected lesson in American digital diplomacy."

In September 2020, Landau was accused of cyberbullying Mariana Braojos, a Mexican college student who criticized him on Twitter. Landau replied by sarcastically saying, "Obviously, your great education and knowledge of the world would allow you to do diplomatic work much better than the 'rudimentary' communications of this 'white foreigner.' " The student reportedly closed their account on Twitter following the exchange.

=== United States deputy secretary of state ===
==== Nomination ====
With Secretary of State Marco Rubio, May 2025.

Landau was nominated to be deputy secretary of state by President-elect Donald Trump on December 8, 2024. Top Trump official Stephen Miller had lobbied for his appointment. On the day of his appointment, Landau declared that one of his priorities would be the relationship between the United States and Mexico. His appointment was welcomed by Mexican President Claudia Sheinbaum, who said he had done a "very good job" as U.S. ambassador to Mexico.

During his confirmation hearing before the Senate Foreign Relations Committee on March 4, 2025, Landau supported the dismantling of USAID and proposed that it be replaced by private sector investment. He also asserted that China was the United States' main strategic competitor, and that they would have to work with their allies and partners in the Indo-Pacific, such as the members of ASEAN and QUAD. Landau called for a reduction in the U.S. trade deficit. He also stated that he believes in the rule of law and will implement all laws passed by Congress. The committee voted 16–6 in favor of his nomination on March 12, 2025. Landau won the support of some Democrats.

==== Tenure ====
On March 24, 2025, the Senate confirmed his nomination 60–31 and he was sworn in as the twenty-third United States deputy secretary of state the following day. One of his first actions was a call on March 26, 2025, with the Mexican Secretary of Foreign Affairs Juan Ramón de la Fuente, in which Landau pledged to strengthen the bilateral relationship between their two countries. On the same day, he had a call with the Argentine Foreign Minister Gerardo Werthein in which Landau praised Argentina's role in the region and its protection of political opponents of Venezuelan leader Nicolas Maduro.

== Personal life ==
Landau was raised in the Roman Catholic faith, and has noted he is devotee of Our Lady of Guadalupe. Landau has Jewish ancestry through his father, George Landau, who fled Vienna shortly after the Anschluss in 1938.

== See also ==
- List of ambassadors of the United States to Mexico
- List of law clerks for the ninth seat of the Supreme Court of the United States
- List of law clerks for the tenth seat of the Supreme Court of the United States
- Donald Trump Supreme Court candidates

Diplomatic posts
Preceded by Roberta S. Jacobson	United States Ambassador to Mexico; 2019–2021	Succeeded by Ken Salazar
Political offices
Preceded by Kurt M. Campbell	United States Deputy Secretary of State; 2025–present	Incumbent
