= George W. Landau =

American diplomat (1920–2018)

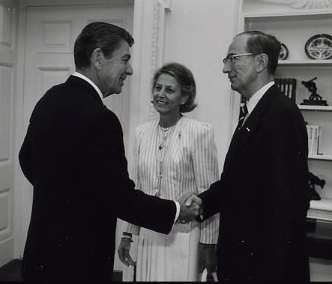
- George Landau and Maria Landau with Ronald Reagan in 1982

United States Ambassador to Venezuela
- In office 1982–1985
- President: Ronald Reagan
- Preceded by: William H. Luers
- Succeeded by: Otto J. Reich

United States Ambassador to Chile
- In office 1977–1982
- President: Jimmy Carter; Ronald Reagan
- Preceded by: David H. Popper
- Succeeded by: James D. Theberge

United States Ambassador to Paraguay
- In office 1972–1977
- President: Richard Nixon; Gerald Ford; Jimmy Carter
- Preceded by: J. Raymond Ylitalo
- Succeeded by: Robert E. White

Personal details
- Born: March 4, 1920 Vienna, Austria
- Died: October 9, 2018 (aged 98) Bethesda, Maryland
- Spouse: Maria Anna Jobst (1946–2010)
- Relations: Christopher Landau (son)
- Parents: Jakob Abraham Landau (1884–1958) (father); Jeanette (Jetti) Klausner (1892–1974) (mother)
- Education: New York University; George Washington University

George Walter Landau (March 4, 1920 – October 9, 2018) was an American diplomat who served as the United States ambassador to Paraguay, Chile, and Venezuela.

== Early life and education ==
George Walter Landau was born on March 4, 1920, in Vienna, Austria, to a Jewish family. He left Austria for Colombia, South America, in July 1938, shortly after Nazi Germany annexed Austria in the Anschluss. In Colombia, he converted to Catholicism and, with the help of the Roman Catholic Church, secured his parents' release from Austria. He eventually obtained employment with Otis Elevator Company in Colombia, was transferred to the New York office, and arrived in the United States in July 1941.

After Pearl Harbor and the United States' involvement in World War II, Otis told Landau that he would be discharged because the company was pursuing military contracts and he was technically an enemy alien, even though the German government took the position that he had lost his citizenship. Landau thought this situation was unfair, and wrote a letter to the Attorney General of the United States requesting relief. He delivered the letter in person to the Department of Justice in Washington on Christmas Eve 1941, and obtained a letter from the department stating that there was no basis for discharging him. Nonetheless, he quit several weeks later, enlisted in the military, and became a naturalized citizen of the United States in 1943.

He attended New York University before receiving his associate degree in 1969 from George Washington University. In May 1988, George Washington University awarded him an honorary doctor of public service degree.

== Career ==
=== Military career ===
Landau entered the United States Army in November 1942. After graduating from Officer's Candidate School, he served as Military Intelligence Officer in the European Theater of Operations. He left active duty status as a captain in Military Intelligence in 1947 but remained in the United States Army Reserve until 1975, when he retired with the rank of colonel. Among his decorations are the Army Commendation Medal and the Meritorious Service Medal.

Landau served in private business as an executive of a shipping company from 1947 to 1955, and as general manager of an American automobile distributor in Colombia from 1955 to 1957.

=== Diplomacy ===
In 1957, he began his career in the United States Foreign Service as commercial attaché and chief of the economic section in Montevideo, where he also served as member of the U.S. delegation that created the "Alliance for Progress" in Punta del Este in 1961. From 1962 to 1965, he was a political officer at the U.S. Embassy in Madrid, Spain, and attended the Canadian Forces College from 1965 to 1966. He was country director of the Office of Spanish and Portuguese Affairs in the Bureau of European and Eurasian Affairs from 1966 to 1972. He was ambassador to Paraguay from 1972 to 1977 and ambassador to Chile from 1977 to 1982. From January to April 1982, he served as executive director of the Presidential Commission on Broadcasting to Cuba. President Ronald Reagan appointed him to be ambassador to Venezuela, and he served from 1982 to 1985. Landau received the State Department's Superior Honor Award for his work in the negotiation of the 1970 Spanish Base Agreement. He also was the action officer in concluding the renewal of the Azores Basing agreement with Portugal in 1972. He was awarded the Presidential Meritorious Service Award in 1984 and has been decorated by the Governments of Argentina, Chile, Colombia, Paraguay, Peru and Venezuela. Ambassador Landau left the Foreign Service in 1985 to become president of the Americas Society. He retired in 1993. Landau also served as chairman of the Latin Advisory Board of Coca-Cola and of Guardian Industries, a major float glass manufacturer with several plants in Latin America. He was on the board of the Emigrant Bank from 1967 to 2005, and on the advisory committee of the Export–Import Bank of the United States in 1991 and 1992. Landau spoke fluent German and Spanish.

=== Retirement ===
Landau was a member of the American Academy of Diplomacy and of the Council on Foreign Relations. He was also a member of The Metropolitan Club, where he served as governor from 1991 to 1995. He was also a member of the American Foreign Service Association and DACOR (Diplomatic and Consular Officers, Retired). In 2013, he was presented the Lifetime Contributions to American Diplomacy Award by the American Foreign Service Association.

== Personal life ==
His younger son, Christopher Landau, a career lawyer, was the United States ambassador to Mexico between 2019 and 2021, and currently serves as deputy secretary of state. George W. Landau died in October 2018 at the age of 98 in Bethesda, Maryland, and was buried at Arlington National Cemetery.

Diplomatic posts
Preceded by J. Raymond Ylitalo	United States Ambassador to Paraguay; 1972–1977	Succeeded by Robert E. White
Preceded by David H. Popper	United States Ambassador to Chile; 1977–1982	Succeeded by James D. Theberge
Preceded by William H. Luers	United States Ambassador to Venezuela; 1982–1985	Succeeded by Otto J. Reich
