= James H. Thessin =

American lawyer

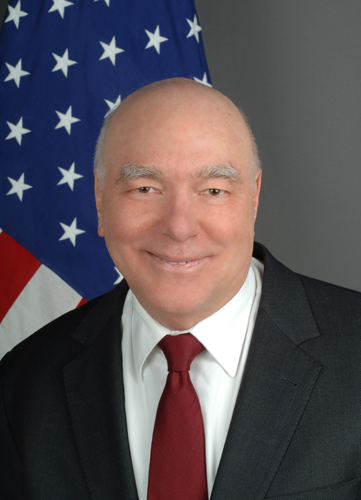
James Thessin US diplomat

James H. Thessin (born April 19, 1948, Milwaukee, Wisconsin) is an attorney and was a career American diplomat Ambassador to the Republic of Paraguay from 2011 until 2014.

== Education ==
Thessin is a cum laude from the Harvard Law School and graduated with a bachelor's degree summa cum laude from the Catholic University of America.

== Career ==
Thessin began working at the US Department of State in 1982 when he was an Attorney-Adviser for Political-Military Affairs. His career continued as he served as Assistant Legal Adviser for Human Rights and Refugee Affairs, Assistant Legal Adviser for Management, and Deputy Legal Adviser. Prior to his tenure at the State Department, he was a Senior Litigation Attorney for the U.S. Nuclear Regulatory Commission from 1981 to 1982 Counsel on the Senate Foreign Relations Committee from 1978 to 1981 and as an antitrust attorney with the Federal Trade Commission from 1974 to 1978.

Diplomatic posts
Preceded by Liliana Ayalde	United States Ambassador to Paraguay; 2011–2014	Succeeded by Leslie A. Bassett
