= Colin Powell School for Civic and Global Leadership =

Division of the City College of New York

Coordinates: 40.82048°N 73.94849°W

- Type: Public
- Established: 1976; 50 years ago
- Parent institution: The City College of New York
- Dean: Marc_Ostfield
- Students: 4,364
- Undergraduates: 4,012
- Postgraduates: 352
- Location: New York, United States
- Website: colinpowellschool.ccny.cuny.edu

The Colin Powell School for Civic and Global Leadership is the social sciences division of the City College of New York (CCNY), a public research university within the City University of New York(CUNY) system. Named in honor of Colin L. Powell in 2013, a former United States Secretary of State and 1958 graduate of City College, the school integrates academic education in the social sciences with leadership development, public service, and civic engagement.

Established in 2013 through the merger of CCNY's Division of Social Sciences and the Colin Powell Center for Leadership and Service, the school traces its roots to the founding of the Division of Social Sciences in 1976 and the Colin Powell Center in 1997.

The school comprises five academic departments and several interdisciplinary research centers and institutes. It is located in the North Academic Center at CCNY's campus in Harlem, Manhattan, at 160 Convent Avenue, New York City.

== History ==
=== Origins of the Division of Social Sciences (1976) ===
The history of the Colin Powell School is closely connected to the development of the social sciences at the City College of New York. Although social science disciplines had been taught at the college for decades, the Division of Social Sciences was formally established in 1976.

The division emerged during a period of significant social, economic, and institutional change in New York City. The civil rights movement, growing concerns about urban inequality, and the city's fiscal crisis shaped the broader context of its formation. At City College, the 1969 student protests and the introduction of CUNY's open admissions policy in 1970had also transformed access to higher education. Against this backdrop, the division brought together academic disciplines focused on the study of society, economics, politics, institutions, and human behavior.

In 2016, the Colin Powell School commemorated the division's 40th anniversary through public programming, oral histories, and an exhibition documenting the history of social sciences education at City College.

In 2026, the Division of Social Sciences marks its 50th anniversary, recognizing five decades of academic development at City College and the division's subsequent evolution into the Colin Powell School.

General Colin Powell with CCNY Chancellor on the Inaguration Ceremony of Colin Powell Center for Policy Studies at the City College of New York

=== Establishment of the Colin Powell Center (1997–2012) ===
In 1997, City College established the Colin Powell Center for Policy Studies in honor of General Colin L. Powell, a distinguished alumnus who graduated in 1958.

The center focused on preparing students for careers in public service and encouraging civic participation through leadership development, community-based research, and service-learning initiatives.

General Colin Powell with then students and center director Vince Boudreau

Its activities expanded over time to encompass public policy, international affairs, community development, and student leadership.

In 2011, the center was renamed the Colin L. Powell Center for Leadership and Service, reflecting its expanded educational and civic engagement activities.

The inaugural Board of Visitors of the Colin Powell School for Civic and Global Leadership, established in 2013, with General Colin L. Powell and fellow board members at The City College of New York.

=== Formation of the Colin Powell School (2013) ===
On April 29, 2013, the CUNY Board of Trustees approved the establishment of the Colin Powell School for Civic and Global Leadership, incorporating the existing Division of Social Sciences and the Colin Powell Center for Leadership and Service.

The school was formally inaugurated on May 2, 2013. Its formation brought academic programs in the social sciences together with fellowship programs, leadership education, and public service initiatives under a unified organizational structure.

The school was named in recognition of Powell's longstanding relationship with City College and his involvement in its leadership and public service programs.

=== Institutional development (2013–present) ===
Following its establishment, the Colin Powell School expanded its academic offerings, student fellowship and internship opportunities, research initiatives, and partnerships with public, nonprofit, and private-sector organizations.

In 2022, the Leadership for Democracy and Social Justice institute was established as a joint initiative of the Colin Powell School and the CUNY School of Labor and Urban Studies.

In 2023, the school launched the Moynihan Center, named after former United States Senator Daniel Patrick Moynihan, to support public scholarship, civic leadership, and public service education.

The school's subsequent initiatives included the Social Mobility Lab launched in April, 2024, which supports research and educational programming focused on economic and social mobility.

In 2025, the school announced the development of the Health and Opportunity Leadership Institute (HOLI), under the direction of Dave A. Chokshi, former New York City Health Commissioner. The institute formally launched in 2026.

Marc Ostfield became dean of the Colin Powell School in January 2026, succeeding the school's previous long-serving dean, Andrew Rich, who departed in 2025.

== Academics ==
The Colin Powell School comprises five academic departments:

- Anthropology and Interdisciplinary Programs
- Economics and Business
- Political Science
- Psychology
- Sociology

The school offers bachelor's degree programs in a range of social science disciplines. It also offers Master's programs and one doctoral program in clinical psychology.

== Centers and institutes ==
The Colin Powell School is associated with several research centers and leadership institutes that support scholarship, public programming, professional education, and civic engagement:

- CUNY Dominican Studies Institute: Established in 1992 by the Council of Dominican Educators and formally approved by the CUNY Board of Trustees in February 1994, the CUNY Dominican Studies Institute is a research institution devoted to the history, culture, and experiences of people of Dominican descent in the United States and elsewhere.
- Health and Opportunity Leadership Institute (HOLI): HOLI is an interdisciplinary leadership and educational initiative focused on health, health policy, and public service. Announced in 2025 and launched in 2026, HOLI administers student mentorship, internship, and educational programs related to health policy.
- Leadership for Democracy and Social Justice (LDSJ): The LDSJ is an institute jointly associated with the Colin Powell School and the CUNY School of Labor and Urban Studies. Established in 2022, the institute provides leadership training, fellowships, mentorship, and professional development for emerging and mid-career leaders working in labor organizing, public advocacy, and community-based organizations.
- The Moynihan Center: Established in 2023, the Moynihan Center is named for former U.S. Senator Daniel Patrick Moynihan and administers fellowships, graduate programs, and public events focused on government and public affairs.
- Social Mobility Lab: Launched in April, 2024, the Social Mobility Lab conducts and supports research into the factors influencing upward social and economic mobility, with particular attention to the role of higher education.

== Fellowships, internships, and leadership development ==
The Colin Powell School provides fellowships, scholarships, paid internships, and mentorship programs designed to support students' academic and professional development. According to the school, approximately 150 students participate in fellowships annually, with $1 million offered in fellowship scholarships and stipends. The Office of Student Success reports approximately $2 million in scholarships and stipends awarded annually, around 200 students participating in paid internships each year, and 100 internship partners. Since 2022, the school has allocated $5.5 million to support paid internships.

Fellowship programs span public service, law, journalism, finance, international affairs, climate policy, and social justice. Corporate partnerships with Santander, Moody's, AccountAbility, and Bloom Energy provide additional opportunities for professional training, mentorship, and industry engagement.

The school's centers and institutes also administer specialized programs, including public service fellowships through the Moynihan Center and leadership training and fellowships through Leadership for Democracy and Social Justice.

== Students ==
General Colin Powell with Powell School Fellows

The Colin Powell School is the largest academic division at City College, enrolling approximately 4,000 students, representing a 40% increase in enrollment since 2018. According to the school's published demographics, more than 70% of students are first-generation college students, over 50% are immigrants, and approximately 85% are people of color.

== Community engagement and public service ==
The Colin Powell School maintains partnerships with government agencies, nonprofit organizations, academic institutions, and private-sector organizations to support student internships, public programming, and leadership development.

Notable speakers at Colin Powell School public events. From left to right: former U.S. Secretary of State Condoleezza Rice, television journalist Gayle King, New York State Attorney General Letitia James, and former United Nations Secretary-General Ban Ki-moon.

Its centers and institutes conduct research and educational activities relating to public policy, health, social mobility, democracy, Dominican studies, and social change.

The school also hosts lectures, conferences, and public conversations featuring scholars, government officials, journalists, civic leaders, and policymakers.

== Leadership and governance ==
The Colin Powell School is led by the Richard J. Henley and Susan L. Davis Dean, Marc Ostfield assumed the deanship on January 26, 2026. Before joining City College, Ostfield served as the United States ambassador to Paraguay from 2022 to 2025 and held other diplomatic and educational leadership positions.

The school's founding dean, Vincent Boudreau, served from 2013 to 2016, having previously directed the Colin Powell Center from 2002 to 2013. Boudreau became the 13th president of the City College of New York in December 2017, a position he continues to hold. Andrew Rich served as the school's second permanent dean from 2019 to 2025 before becoming the 17th president of Franklin & Marshall College in July 2025. Kevin Foster subsequently served as interim dean until Ostfield's appointment in January 2026.

The school is also advised by a Board of Visitors composed of individuals from public service, business, philanthropy, academia, and other professional fields. Its members provide institutional guidance and support for the school's educational and public service activities.

== Board of Visitors ==
The Colin Powell School is advised by a Board of Visitors established in 2013, with General Colin L. Powell serving as its founding chair. The board comprises leaders from government, business, philanthropy, academia, and public service who support the school's strategic direction, fundraising, and institutional development. Following General Powell's death in 2021, his daughter, Linda Powell, assumed a leadership role on the board. She serves as co-chair alongside Marco Antonio Achón.
