= List of ambassadors of the United States to Paraguay =

United States ambassadors

Ambassador of the United States to Paraguay
- Seal of the United States Department of State

- Flag of a United States ambassador

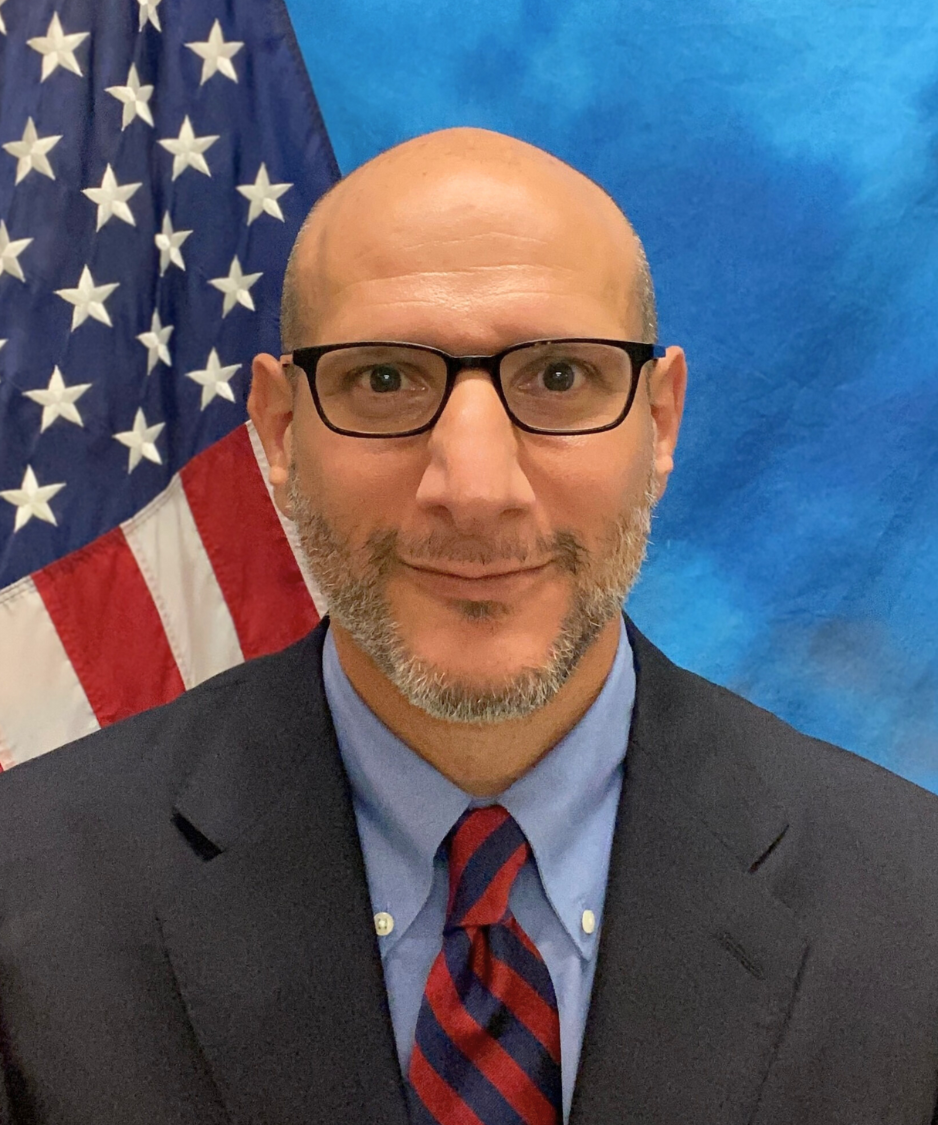
- Incumbent; Robert Alter (as Chargé d'Affaires) since July 15, 2025
- Nominator: The president of the United States
- Appointer: The president with Senate advice and consent
- Inaugural holder: Charles Ames Washburn as Commissioner
- Formation: November 26, 1861
- Website: U.S. Embassy - Asuncion

The following is a list of United States ambassadors, or other chiefs of mission, to Paraguay. The title given by the United States State Department to this position is currently Ambassador Extraordinary and Minister Plenipotentiary.

| Representative | Title | Presentation of credentials | Termination of mission | Appointed by |
|---|---|---|---|---|
| Charles Ames Washburn | Commissioner | November 26, 1861 | May 13, 1863 | Abraham Lincoln |
| Charles Ames Washburn | Minister Resident | May 13, 1863 | September 10, 1868 | Abraham Lincoln |
| Martin T. McMahon | Minister Resident | December 12, 1868 | June 21, 1869 | Andrew Johnson |
| John L. Stevens | Minister Resident | August 26, 1870 | May 19, 1873 | Ulysses S. Grant |
| John C. Caldwell | Minister Resident | December 15, 1874 | October 6, 1876 | Ulysses S. Grant |
| John C. Caldwell | Chargé d'Affaires | October 6, 1876 | July 10, 1882 | Ulysses S. Grant |
| William Williams | Chargé d'Affaires | August 26, 1882 | July 21, 1885 | Chester A. Arthur |
| John E. Bacon | Chargé d'Affaires | September 16, 1885 | October 23, 1888 | Grover Cleveland |
| John E. Bacon | Minister Resident | October 23, 1888 | December 26, 1888 | Grover Cleveland |
| George Maney | Minister Resident | May 19, 1890 | August 1891 | Benjamin Harrison |
| George Maney | Envoy Extraordinary and Minister Plenipotentiary | August 1891 | June 30, 1894 | Benjamin Harrison |
| Granville Stuart | Envoy Extraordinary and Minister Plenipotentiary | September 6, 1894 | January 4, 1898 | Grover Cleveland |
| William R. Finch | Envoy Extraordinary and Minister Plenipotentiary | August 3, 1898 | May 29, 1905 | William McKinley |
| Edward C. O'Brien | Envoy Extraordinary and Minister Plenipotentiary | August 5, 1905 | October 10, 1909 | Theodore Roosevelt |
| Edwin V. Morgan | Envoy Extraordinary and Minister Plenipotentiary | June 29, 1910 | July 8, 1911 | William H. Taft |
| Nicolai A. Grevstad | Envoy Extraordinary and Minister Plenipotentiary | October 30, 1911 | February 19, 1914 | William H. Taft |
| Daniel F. Mooney | Envoy Extraordinary and Minister Plenipotentiary | May 13, 1914 | June 13, 1921 | Woodrow Wilson |
| William J. O'Toole | Envoy Extraordinary and Minister Plenipotentiary | April 3, 1922 | February 21, 1924 | Warren G. Harding |
| George L. Kreeck | Envoy Extraordinary and Minister Plenipotentiary | July 22, 1925 | February 5, 1930 | Calvin Coolidge |
| Post Wheeler | Envoy Extraordinary and Minister Plenipotentiary | February 12, 1930 | April 17, 1933 | Herbert Hoover |
| Meredith Nicholson | Envoy Extraordinary and Minister Plenipotentiary | October 30, 1933 | February 3, 1935 | Franklin D. Roosevelt |
| Findley B. Howard | Envoy Extraordinary and Minister Plenipotentiary | October 14, 1935 | January 16, 1941 | Franklin D. Roosevelt |
| Wesley Frost | Envoy Extraordinary and Minister Plenipotentiary | April 30, 1941 | April 15, 1942 | Franklin D. Roosevelt |
| Wesley Frost | Ambassador Extraordinary and Plenipotentiary | April 15, 1942 | May 28, 1944 | Franklin D. Roosevelt |
| Willard L. Beaulac | Ambassador Extraordinary and Plenipotentiary | September 13, 1944 | May 28, 1947 | Franklin D. Roosevelt |
| Fletcher Warren | Ambassador Extraordinary and Plenipotentiary | October 8, 1947 | July 25, 1950 | Harry S. Truman |
| Howard H. Tewksbury | Ambassador Extraordinary and Plenipotentiary | January 9, 1951 | February 16, 1952 | Harry S. Truman |
| George P. Shaw | Ambassador Extraordinary and Plenipotentiary | July 1, 1952 | October 31, 1953 | Harry S. Truman |
| Arthur A. Ageton | Ambassador Extraordinary and Plenipotentiary | September 9, 1954 | April 10, 1957 | Dwight D. Eisenhower |
| Walter C. Ploeser | Ambassador Extraordinary and Plenipotentiary | November 6, 1957 | September 12, 1959 | Dwight D. Eisenhower |
| Harry F. Stimpson, Jr. | Ambassador Extraordinary and Plenipotentiary | October 23, 1959 | March 12, 1961 | Dwight D. Eisenhower |
| William P. Snow | Ambassador Extraordinary and Plenipotentiary | August 4, 1961 | June 15, 1967 | John F. Kennedy |
| Benigno C. Hernández | Ambassador Extraordinary and Plenipotentiary | August 9, 1967 | July 15, 1969 | Lyndon B. Johnson |
| J. Raymond Ylitalo | Ambassador Extraordinary and Plenipotentiary | August 14, 1969 | September 11, 1972 | Richard Nixon |
| George W. Landau | Ambassador Extraordinary and Plenipotentiary | October 13, 1972 | October 14, 1977 | Richard Nixon |
| Robert E. White | Ambassador Extraordinary and Plenipotentiary | November 30, 1977 | January 27, 1980 | Jimmy Carter |
| Lyle Franklin Lane | Ambassador Extraordinary and Plenipotentiary | September 9, 1980 | May 21, 1982 | Jimmy Carter |
| Arthur H. Davis, Jr. | Ambassador Extraordinary and Plenipotentiary | August 6, 1982 | September 28, 1985 | Ronald Reagan |
| Clyde D. Taylor | Ambassador Extraordinary and Plenipotentiary | November 12, 1985 | September 2, 1988 | Ronald Reagan |
| Timothy Lathrop Towell | Ambassador Extraordinary and Plenipotentiary | September 26, 1988 | April 27, 1991 | Ronald Reagan |
| Jon David Glassman | Ambassador Extraordinary and Plenipotentiary | August 8, 1991 | May 3, 1994 | George H. W. Bush |
| Robert Edward Service | Ambassador Extraordinary and Plenipotentiary | November 18, 1994 | October 7, 1997 | Bill Clinton |
| Maura Harty | Ambassador Extraordinary and Plenipotentiary | October 22, 1997 | May 30, 1999 | Bill Clinton |
| David N. Greenlee | Ambassador Extraordinary and Plenipotentiary | July 19, 2000 | January 15, 2003 | Bill Clinton |
| John F. Keane | Ambassador Extraordinary and Plenipotentiary | February 11, 2003 | October 27, 2005 | George W. Bush |
| James Caldwell Cason | Ambassador Extraordinary and Plenipotentiary | February 1, 2006 | August 2, 2008 | George W. Bush |
| Liliana Ayalde | Ambassador Extraordinary and Plenipotentiary | August 11, 2008 | August 5, 2011 | George W. Bush |
| James H. Thessin | Ambassador Extraordinary and Plenipotentiary | September 30, 2011 | August 2, 2014 | Barack Obama |
| Leslie A. Bassett | Ambassador Extraordinary and Plenipotentiary | January 15, 2015 | January 31, 2017 | Barack Obama |
| M. Lee McClenny | Ambassador Extraordinary and Plenipotentiary | February 20, 2018 | September 16, 2020 | Donald Trump |
| Joseph Salazar | Chargé d'Affaires | September 16, 2020 | March 9, 2022 | Donald Trump; Joe Biden |
| Marc Ostfield | Ambassador Extraordinary and Plenipotentiary | March 9, 2022 | January 20, 2025 | Joe Biden |
| Amir P. Masliyah | Chargé d'Affaires | January 21, 2025 | July 15, 2025 | Donald Trump |
| Robert Alter | Chargé d'Affaires | July 15, 2025 | Incumbent | Donald Trump |

== See also ==
- Paraguay–United States relations
- Foreign relations of Paraguay
- Ambassadors of the United States
