= M. Lee McClenny =

American diplomat (born 1961)

Lee McClenny
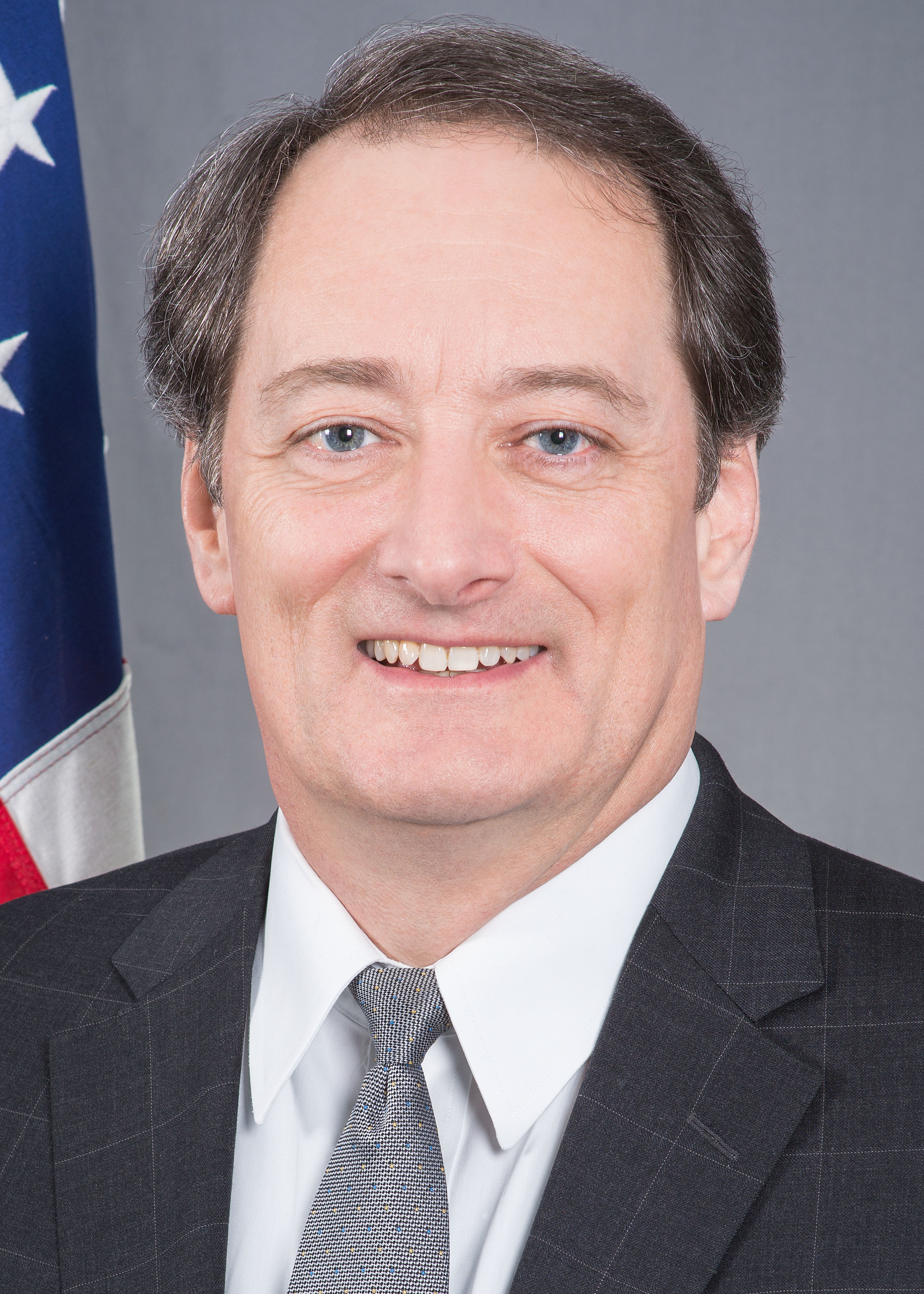

United States Ambassador to Paraguay
- In office February 20, 2018 – September 16, 2020
- President: Donald Trump
- Preceded by: Leslie A. Bassett
- Succeeded by: Marc Ostfield

Personal details
- Born: 1961 (age 64–65) San Francisco, California
- Spouse: Katherine Latimer
- Children: 2
- Education: University of Washington (B.A.)

M. Lee McClenny (born 1961) is an American diplomat who served as the United States Ambassador to Paraguay from 2018 to 2020.

== Education ==
McClenny received his Bachelor of Arts degree from the University of Washington in Seattle.

== Career ==
McClenny is a career member of the Senior Foreign Service. He has been working for the State Department since 1994 and held various positions including Chargé d'affaires at the U.S. Embassy in Caracas, Venezuela.

=== United States Ambassador to Paraguay ===
On October 30, 2017, President Trump nominated McClenny to be the United States Ambassador to Paraguay. On December 21, 2017, the Senate confirmed his nomination by voice vote. He was sworn in on February 20, 2018. He left office on September 16, 2020.

== Personal life ==
McClenny speaks Spanish, French, and some Serbo-Croatian and Russian.

== See also ==
- List of ambassadors appointed by Donald Trump

Diplomatic posts
Preceded by Leslie A. Bassett	United States Ambassador to Paraguay; 2018–2020	Succeeded by Joseph Salazar; Chargé d'affaires
