= Leslie A. Bassett =

American diplomat (born 1959)

Leslie Ann Bassett
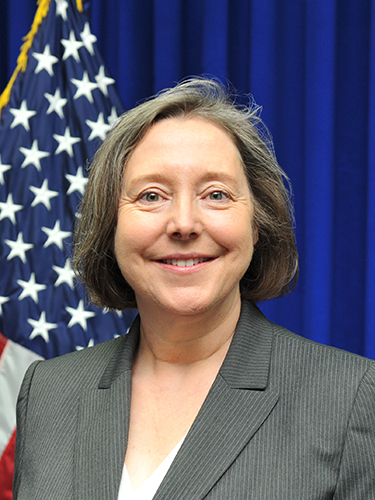

United States Ambassador to Paraguay
- In office January 15, 2015 – January 31, 2017
- President: Barack Obama; Donald Trump
- Preceded by: James Thessin
- Succeeded by: M. Lee McClenny

Personal details
- Born: 1959 (age 66–67)
- Education: University of California, Davis; Johns Hopkins University; National Defense University

Leslie Ann Bassett (born 1959) is a diplomat and former United States Ambassador to Paraguay. She was nominated by President Barack Obama and confirmed by the Senate in November 2014. She presented her credentials January 15, 2015, and left the post January 31, 2017.

== Early life and education ==
Bassett is one of three children of Carole Gilchrist Bassett and Kimbrough Stone Bassett. In 1981, she graduated from the University of California, Davis with a bachelor's degree in international relations.

== Career ==
After college, Bassett became a copy editor for Computer Business News in Boston.

It was her great-great-grandfather, Senator William J. Stone of Missouri, who inspired Bassett's interest in foreign service. He sat as Chairman of the Senate Foreign Relations Committee a hundred years before the committee recommended Senate approval of Bassett's nomination as ambassador to Paraguay in 2014. When she first joined the Foreign Service, Bassett held several international assignments, including posts in Tel Aviv, Israel; San Salvador, El Salvador; Durban, South Africa and Managua, Nicaragua.

After returning to Washington, D.C., she earned an M.A. in 1998 from Johns Hopkins University and an M.S. in national security policy studies from the National War College in 1999.

Other international assignments followed. Bassett was Counselor for Political-Economic Affairs at the U.S. Embassy in Bogotá, Colombia from 1999 to 2001 and Deputy Chief of Mission at the U.S. Embassy in Gaborone, Botswana, from 2001 to 2004.

Bassett served at the Embassy in Mexico from 2006 to 2009.

When President Obama nominated her to become ambassador, she was serving as Deputy Chief of Mission for the U.S. Embassy in Seoul, South Korea.

== Personal life ==
Bassett has one daughter.

== See also ==
Diplomatic posts
Preceded by James Thessin	United States Ambassador to Paraguay; 2015–2017	Succeeded by M. Lee McClenny
