= Harry F. Stimpson Jr. =

American lawyer and ambassador (1913–2005)

Harry Farnum Stimpson Junior

United States Ambassador to Paraguay
- In office September 2, 1959 – March 12, 1961
- President: Dwight Eisenhower
- Preceded by: Walter C. Ploeser
- Succeeded by: William P. Snow

Personal details
- Born: October 16, 1913 Newton, Massachusetts, U.S.
- Died: April 17, 2005 (aged 91) Plymouth, Massachusetts, U.S.
- Party: Republican

Harry Farnum Stimpson Jr. (October 16, 1913 – April 17, 2005) was an American lawyer who was the United States' ambassador to Paraguay from 1959 to 1961.

== Biography ==
=== Early life ===
Harry was born on October 16, 1913, as the second son of Harry Farnum Simpson Sr. and his wife Francis Maude Greenway. He studied at Noble and Greenough School, Harvard University, and University of Virginia School of Law, graduating at all of those.

=== Political career and marriage ===
On 27 June 1942, Harry married Margaret Lewis Bird in Virginia. From 1953 to 1954, he was the secretary for the governor of Massachusetts. On 27 August 1959, Harry was nominated by Dwight D. Eisenhower to be the United States' ambassador to Paraguay, also becoming an assistant to Christian Herter, the Secretary of State at the time. In 1962, he was the Republican candidate for Massachusetts's 11th district.

=== Later life and death ===
In 1987, his wife Margaret died. Two years later, he married again, this time to Martha B. Stimpson. He died on April 7, 2005 in Plymouth, Massachusetts.
