= Liliana Ayalde =

American diplomat (born 1956)

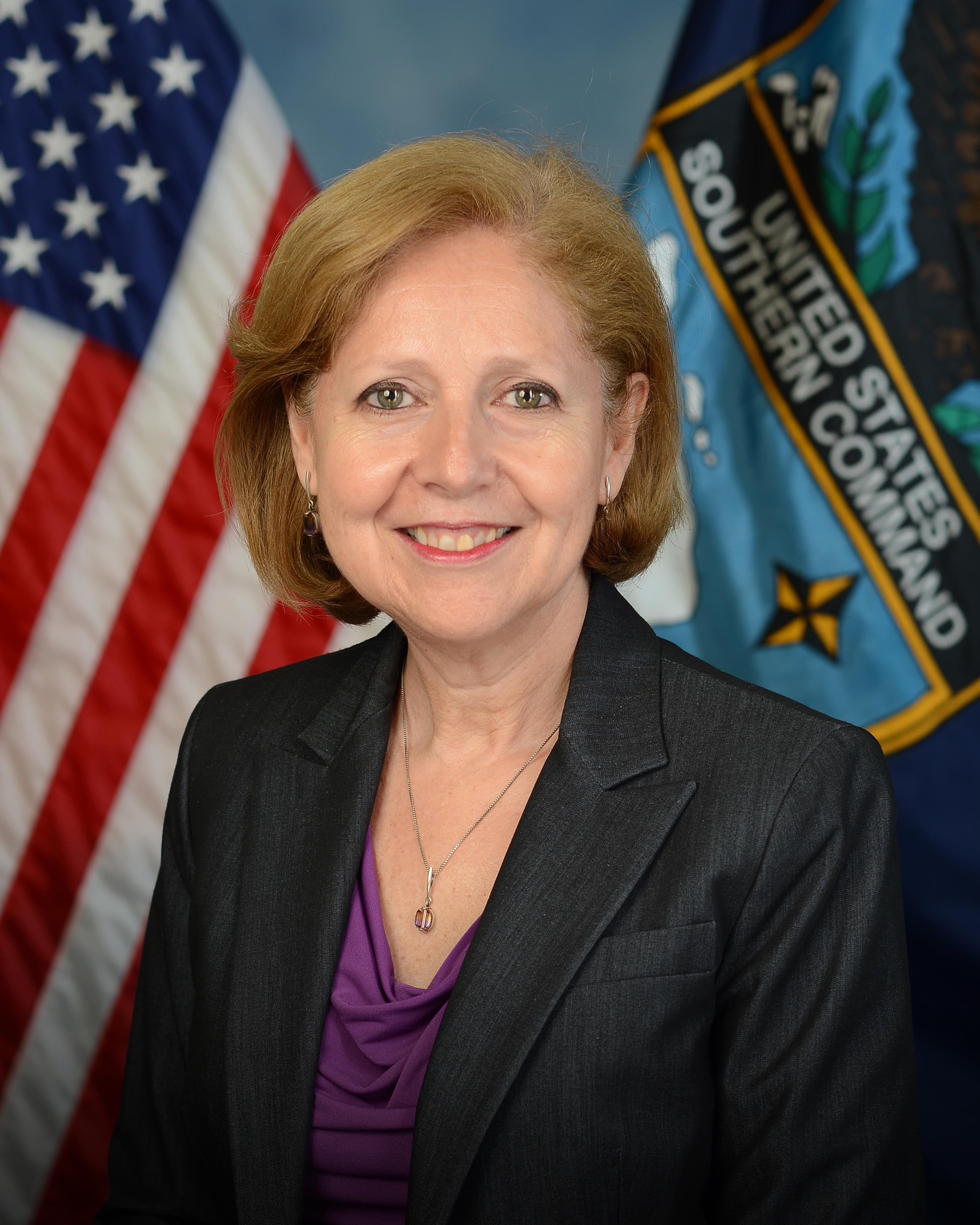

United States Ambassador to Brazil
- In office October 31, 2013 – January 3, 2017
- President: Barack Obama
- Deputy: Andrew Bowen
- Preceded by: Tom Shannon
- Succeeded by: P. Michael McKinley

United States Ambassador to Paraguay
- In office August 11, 2008 – August 5, 2011
- President: George W. Bush; Barack Obama
- Preceded by: James Cason
- Succeeded by: James Thessin

Personal details
- Born: March 1956 (age 70) Baltimore, Maryland, U.S.
- Spouse: Luis Jorge Narvaez
- Education: American University; Tulane University

Liliana Ayalde (born March 1956) is an American diplomat. She is the former United States Ambassador to Brazil and was previously the Deputy Assistant Secretary (DAS) for the United States State Department with responsibility for the Offices of Caribbean Affairs, Central American Affairs and Cuban Affairs. From January 2017 to September 2019 she served as the Civilian Deputy to the Commander and Foreign Policy Advisor for the United States Southern Command.

== Education ==
Ayalde earned a Bachelor of Arts degree from the School of International Service at American University and a Master's in Public Health from Tulane University.

== Career ==
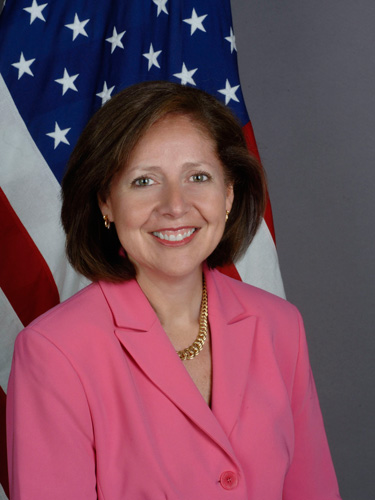
Ambassador Liliana Ayalde

From 2008 to 2011, Liliana Ayalde was the U.S. Ambassador to Asunción, Paraguay. She arrived in Paraguay in June 2008. She had previously served with USAID.

On July 16, 2012, the Department of State announced her promotion to Deputy Assistant Secretary in the State Department's Western Hemisphere (WHA) Bureau, responsible for the Offices of Caribbean Affairs, Central American Affairs and Cuban Affairs.

During her assignment as a Deputy Assistant Administrator, Ambassador Ayalde testified before the U.S. Senate Subcommittee on the Western Hemisphere, Peace Corps, and Global Narcotics Affairs.

From a 2008 State Department bio:

The U.S. Senate confirmed in June 2008 Liliana Ayalde's nomination to be the U.S. Ambassador to Paraguay. Between 2005 and 2008 she served as Mission Director for the United States Agency for International Development (USAID) in Colombia, overseeing a development assistance portfolio of over $200 million. Ayalde holds a bachelor's degree from American University and a master's degree in International Public Health from Tulane University.

On August 1, 2013, the U.S. Senate confirmed Liliana Ayalde's nomination to be the U.S. Ambassador to the Federative Republic of Brazil. She presented her credentials on October 31, 2013, and served until January 3, 2017. In June 2016, P. Michael McKinley was nominated to succeed Ayalde as U.S. Ambassador to Brazil. He was confirmed by the U.S. Senate on September 8, 2016, and formally replaced Ayalde on January 11, 2017.

Diplomatic posts
| Preceded by James Cason | United States Ambassador to Paraguay; 2008–2011 | Succeeded by James Thessin |
| Preceded by Tom Shannon | United States Ambassador to Brazil; 2013–2017 | Succeeded by P. Michael McKinley |
