= College Match =

US non-profit organization

College Match is a non-profit organization based in Los Angeles, California. It was established in 2002 to help high-achieving low-income students from Los Angeles inner-city public high schools, by providing them with a wide range of free personalized college preparation services usually reserved for wealthier students. Since its inception, College Match has paved the way for many students to be accepted to and graduate from selective four year colleges.

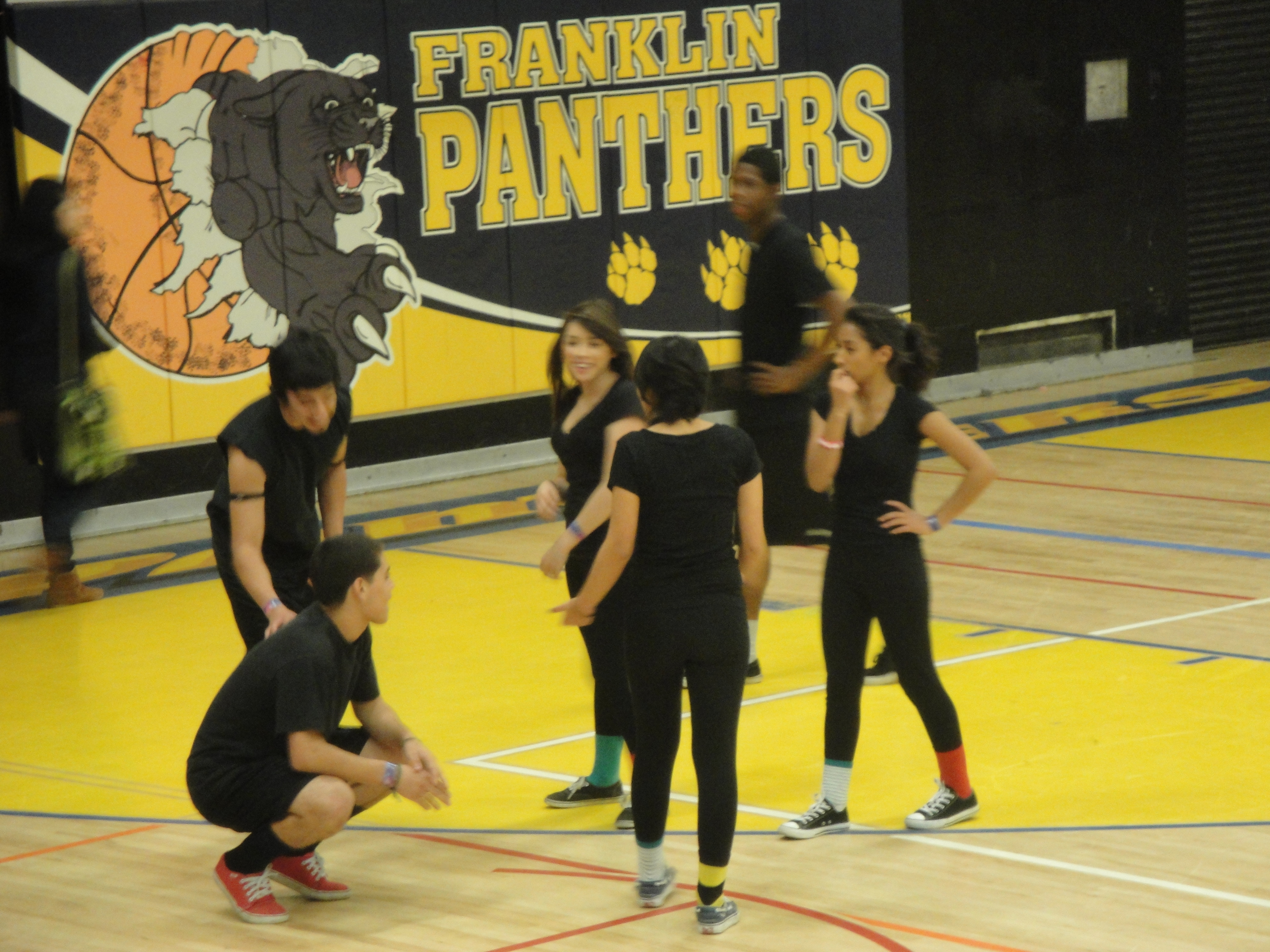
Benjamin Franklin High School in Highland Park, one of the participating high schools that receives assistance from College Match.

== Background ==
=== History ===
Harley Frankel, a Columbia College 1963 alumnus, founded College Match in 2003. Frankel graduated from Harvard Business School and then worked in programs involved with education policy, such as the National Head Start Program and the Pell Grant Program. After his retirement, he decided to find corporate and private support to fund College Match. He recruited the first College Match class in 2003, composed of 23 students and the number increased to 110 students in 2007

=== Staff ===
As the Executive Director, Frankel works with many other individuals to achieve the program's goals. Julie Nielson is the program's Head Counselor, who has served the Los Angeles Unified School District. Erica Rosales, an alumna from Garfield High School and Wellesley College, is the Program Director and a college counselor. Rosales also served as an admissions officer at Occidental College and was the Founding Executive at Animo Leadership High School.

=== Eligibility ===
To be eligible for a spot in the program, students must attend a participating high school and be selected to complete an interview and an application. The applicants must qualify as low-income, have a rigorous course load, a ranking in the upper 15 percent of their classes, a potential to do well in the SAT, a skill in music, athletics, drama, etc., and be open to attending college in the East Coast.

==== Participating high schools ====
List is subject to change:

- Animo Inglewood H.S.
- King Drew Magnet H.S.
- Ouchi H.S.
- International Studies Learning Center in South Gate
- Bell H.S.
- Franklin H.S.
- Oscar De La Hoya H.S.
- The Environmental, Science and Technology Academy
- Garfield H.S. in East Los Angeles
- The Downtown Magnets H.S.
- Camino Nuevo H.S. in Downtown Los Angeles
- The Environmental Charter High School in South Bay
- Nava College Preparatory Academy
- West Adams H.S.
- Bravo Medical Magnet H.S.
- Augustus Hawkins High School
- Alliance Collins Family High School
- STEAM at Legacy High School
- Los Angeles Center for Enriched Studies

== The College Match solution ==
College Match provides each student with two years of free services including SAT prep classes, assistance with essays, college and financial aid applications, and counseling and advising about various colleges. In addition, the program also provides students the opportunity to tour colleges around the country. College Match students partake in various college trips in the East Coast, Middle Atlantic, Southern California, and Northern California. The colleges they visit include, but are not limited to, Ivy League schools, small prestigious Liberal arts college, SAT-optional schools, and Women's colleges. For example, a typical College Match East Coast trip takes ten days, visits five states, and tours fifteen colleges such as Wellesley, Brandeis, Mount Holyoke, Trinity, Yale, Brown, and Harvard. For many of the students, it was their first time traveling to the East Coast.
