= Michael E. Parmly =

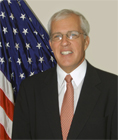

12th Chief of the U.S. Interests Section in Cuba
- In office September 10, 2005 – July 2008
- President: George W. Bush
- Preceded by: James Cason
- Succeeded by: Jonathan D. Farrar

Michael E. Parmly (born 1951) is the former Chief of Mission of the United States Interests Section in Havana, or USINT, a post he held from September 10, 2005 to July 2008. He succeeded James Cason at this post and is predecessor to Jonathan D. Farrar.

== Personal life ==
Parmly attended St. Joseph's College, where he completed an undergraduate degree in International Relations and Latin American Studies. He then earned his Masters of Arts of Law and Diplomacy from the Fletcher School of Law and Diplomacy. He is married to Marie-Catherine née Schutte and has two children.

== Career ==
Parmly worked in youth development as a Peace Corps volunteer in Bucaramanga, Colombia. He is now a career member of the Senior Foreign Service, with the rank of Minister-Counselor. Parmly is a veteran of over 25 years at the State Department. Some of his previous job titles include Senior Advisor to Ambassador Zalmay Khalilzad for the Afghan Presidential elections, Deputy Chief of Mission and Chargé d'Affaires, a.i. at the Embassy in Sarajevo, Bosnia-Herzegovina, State Department representative in Kandahar, Afghanistan, Professor of National Security Studies at the National War College, Office Director for Northern Europe in the Bureau of European Affairs, and Political Counselor at the US Mission to the European Union. The diplomatic postings of Parmly include Afghanistan, Morocco, Paris, Romania, Sarajevo, and Spain.

== Sicko controversy ==
According to WikiLeaks cables published in December 2010, Parmly had classified as "Confidential" a cable dated 31 January 2008 which read, in part, "XXXXXXXXXXXX stated that Cuban authorities have banned Michael Moore's documentary, Sicko, as being subversive. Although the film's intent is to discredit the U.S. healthcare system by highlighting the excellence of the Cuban system, he said the regime knows the film is a myth and does not want to risk a popular backlash by showing to Cubans facilities that are clearly not available to the vast majority of them." This was an attempt to discredit Moore's documentary, which cast the U.S. healthcare system in a bad light. Moore responded in his blog that this had been a fabrication and that "Cuba was shown the film on national television on April 25, 2008."

== Argued for return of Guantanamo to Cuba ==
In 2013, Parmly, now living in Switzerland, wrote a paper arguing that the US base in Guantanamo should be returned to Cuba as reported in the Miami Herald

His full article appeared in the Fletcher Forum.

== See also ==
- Cuba–United States relations
- James Cason
