= John Raymond Ylitalo =

American diplomat

J. Raymond Ylitalo

United States Ambassador to Paraguay
- In office August 14, 1969 – September 11, 1972
- President: Richard Nixon
- Preceded by: Benigno C. Hernández
- Succeeded by: George W. Landau

Personal details
- Born: December 25, 1916 Floodwood, Minnesota, US
- Died: February 10, 1987 (aged 70) Washington, D.C., US
- Spouse: Jean Sarchet
- Profession: Diplomat

John Raymond Ylitalo (December 25, 1916 – February 10, 1987), also known as J. Raymond Ylitalo, was an American diplomat and the 29th United States Ambassador to Paraguay (1969–1972).

== Early years ==
Ylitalo was born to Jussi and Saima Maria (née Swen) Ylitalo of Floodwood, Minnesota, on December 25, 1916. Jussi was a first generation immigrant originally from Rautio, Finland, while Saima was a second generation Finnish-American. Jussi was a miner and a grocer in his life in America. John Raymond was one of four children of Jussi and Saima Ylitalo who survived to adulthood.

After graduating from Floodwood High School, Ylitalo attended Suomi College in Michigan before completing undergraduate studies at St. Olaf College, from which he earned a bachelor's degree in 1937. He then attended Northwestern University, from which he obtained a Master of Business Administration degree the following year. He then went on to be an instructor in commerce at the University of Alabama from 1938 to 1941. In 1941, he became a special agent for the Federal Bureau of Investigation, where he served until he joined the United States Foreign Service in 1946.

== Diplomatic career ==
Since he was of Finnish ancestry and spoke fluent Finnish, Ylitalo's first assignment in the Foreign Service was as a political attaché at the United States Embassy in Helsinki, where he served from 1946 to 1950. Later he became the assistant chief of the State Department's Security Division; in this post, he was in a position where the Defense Department asked him to evaluate The Pond's material, to which he responded that he "could describe it in only one word, 'crap.'"

From 1954 to 1958, Ylitalo served as Consul General in the United States Consulate in Munich. He then served from 1959 to 1962 as the United States Consul General in Manila, Philippines, in which capacity he, on March 6, 1959, reported to the State Department concerning "Conditions Affecting Cultural Presentations in Cebu". He opened the American Consulate in Cebu City, during his tenure in Manila. He was Director the State Department Visa Office in Washington from 1962 to 1968. He was appointed Consul General of the U.S. Consulate in Tijuana, Mexico, in 1968, where he served one year before his ambassadorial promotion.

== Ambassador to Paraguay ==
Ylitalo was appointed Ambassador to Paraguay by President Richard Nixon on July 22, 1969, and presented his letter of accreditation to Alfredo Stroessner on August 14 of that year. Within sixteen months of Ylitalo's assumption of the mission in Paraguay, a major point of contention in Paraguay – United States relations came to light when two pounds of heroin were seized at Miami International Airport, aboard a plane from Paraguay in December 1970.

Narcotics came to dominate the remainder of Ylitalo's tenure as Ambassador, becoming a topic that was always discussed in his conversations with Paraguayan officials. In April 1971, the Bureau of Narcotics and Dangerous Drugs successfully infiltrated the smuggling operation and found that Auguste Ricord was controlling the operation, which had smuggled five thousand kilograms of heroin into the United States between 1965 and 1970. The Paraguayans detained Ricord, but, much to the dismay of the United States, refused to extradite him.

With the Paraguayan refusal to extradite, the embassy responded by expressing "profound disappointment and concern with the decision of the court", noting that "the accused is one of the heads of the international heroin trafficking industry, who has brought misery and death to thousands of youths in the United States and around the World." President Nixon threatened, in January 1972, to cut off foreign aid to Paraguay if Ricord was not extradited, but Paraguay still did not relent.

With the Paraguayan refusal to extradite Ricord, Ylitalo was coming under fire from the American press for being too close to Stroessner. When he noted that there was insufficient evidence to directly connect Stroessner and others in the regime to direct participation in drug trafficking, the attacks against him from the press increased in their severity. Unable to secure Ricord's extradition and increasingly becoming a target for media attacks, Ylitalo was recalled by President Nixon on September 11, 1972.

== Life after the ambassadorship ==
Following the termination of his mission in Paraguay, Ylitalo was appointed to the U.S. Consulate in Toronto, in 1973. He served there as Consul General until his retirement to Washington, D.C., in 1976. Ylitalo died of cancer on February 10, 1987, at Sibley Memorial Hospital in Washington, D.C.

Diplomatic posts
Preceded by George W. Landau	United States Ambassador to Paraguay; 1969–1972	Succeeded by Arthur H. Davis, Jr.
