= Environmental Charter High School =

Coordinates: 33.882024°N 118.355155°W

- Lawndale, California; United States

Information
- Type: Four-year secondary school College Prep Curriculum
- Established: 2002
- Principal: Katherine Villoria
- Enrollment: 500
- Campus: Urban; 1.91 acres
- Colors: Blue, White
- Mascot: White Tiger
- Address: 16315 Grevillea Ave. Lawndale, CA 90260
- Website: ecsonline.org/echs-lawndale/

Environmental Charter High School, abbreviated to ECHS, is a 9th through 12th grade public charter high school in Lawndale, California. It was founded in 2002.

Prior to its founding, there was another high school at the same location that was named “Victory”. It was around from at least 1999–2001.

== History ==
Environmental Charter High School was founded in 2002 by a group of parents, educators, businesses and non-profits. It is the second school in a network of Environmental Charter Schools in South Los Angeles. It was formerly known as “Victory” high school during the 90's.

== Location ==
Environmental Charter High School is located off of Hawthorne Blvd in Lawndale, California. It is located near William Green Park, El Camino College, and walking distance from South Bay Galleria.

== Demographics ==
For the 2015–2016 school year, Environmental Charter High School has 500 registered students.
Diversity:

- Hispanic: 68%
- African-American: 20%
- Asian: 6%
- Caucasian: 4%
- Other: 2%

== Academics ==
Environmental Charter High School focuses on preparing students to continue on to a four-year university by designing student's schedules to align with University of California's A-G requirements.

A variety of enrichment and Advanced Placement classes are offered in Environmental Charter High School including:

- European History
- United States History
- Environmental Science
- Spanish
- Calculus

To build college readiness efforts, Environmental Charter High School offers SAT and ACT preparation as part of the course curriculum. To ensure students are prepared for the SAT, all of students take the PSAT in 9th, 10th, and 11th grades and the PACT in 10th and 11th grade. In order to graduate, all seniors are expected to apply and gain acceptance into a four-year university.

== Athletics ==
Environmental Charter High School offers a variety of sports. The school's athletic teams included men's and women's varsity soccer, basketball, baseball, and softball, as well as a junior varsity men's basketball team.
