= Arthur A. Ageton =

American diplomat, naval officer, and writer

Arthur Ainslie Ageton
- Born: October 25, 1900; Fromberg, Montana, U.S.
- Died: April 23, 1971 (aged 70)
- Spouse: Jo Lucille Gallion
- Military career
- Branch: United States Navy
- Rank: Rear admiral
- Other work: United States Ambassador to Paraguay writer

Arthur Ainslie Ageton (October 25, 1900 – April 23, 1971) was a naval officer, ambassador, writer, and writing teacher. He was the United States Ambassador to Paraguay from September 9, 1954, to April 10, 1957. He was also a rear admiral in the Navy.

He wrote or cowrote books, including The Naval Officer's Guide, Admiral Ambassador to Russia, Manual of Celestial Navigation, and The Marine Officer's Guide.

He was born in Fromberg, Montana and raised in Pullman, Washington, and he died in Bethesda, Maryland.

== Education ==
After receiving his high school diploma Ageton went to Washington State College for one year from 1918 to 1919. He graduated from the Naval Academy in 1923 and earned a post-graduate certificate in 1931. He earned a master's degree in Modern Writing from Johns Hopkins University in 1953.

== Navy history ==
He served as executive officer aboard the battleship USS Washington, promoted to captain, commanded LST Flotilla 3 in the Southwest Pacific, and received the Bronze Star for bravery at the battle of Leyte Gulf.

He wrote The Naval Officer's Guide (1943), six editions in all, and other manuals. He retired as a rear admiral on December 1, 1947.

== Civilian career ==
Ageton served as the ambassador to Paraguay from 1954 to 1957.

Eventually, he taught creative writing at George Washington University.

== Selected works ==
- Dead Reckoning Altitude and Azimuth Table. (1932)
- Manual of Celestial Navigation. (1942) OCLC 569133
- Naval Officer's Guide. (1942)
- Naval Leadership and the American Bluejacket. (1944) OCLC 1747897
- Mary Jo and Little Liu. With pictures by Olive Bailey. (1945) OCLC 9863427
- The Jungle Seas. (1954) OCLC 1618675
- Admiral Ambassador to Russia with Adm. William H. Stadley (1955)
- The Marine Officer's Guide with Gen. G. C. Thomas and Col. R. D. Heinl (1955)
- Hit the Beach (1961) OCLC 2304274

== Awards and honors ==
He received the Legion of Merit and the Bronze Star. From Paraguay, he received the Gran Cruz Orden Nacional del Merito.

== Personal life ==
Ageton married Jo Lucille Gallion on Nov. 24, 1933. They had two children: Arthur Ainslie Ageton Jr. and Mary Jo Ageton.

== Death and legacy ==
Ageton died in 1971.

His papers are held in the de Grummond Collection of the McCain Library and Archives at the University of Southern Mississippi and in the Howard Gotlieb Archival Research Center of Boston University.
