= Institutionalization of politics =

- Synonym: political institutionalization
- meaning: the introduction of "routinized, recurrent and predictable patterns of political behavior"

Institutionalization of politics
- Traditional Chinese: 政治制度化
- Simplified Chinese: 政治制度化
Transcriptions
Standard Mandarin
- Hanyu Pinyin: Zhèngzhì zhìdùhuà

The institutionalization of politics (also spelled as institutionalisation of politics; Chinese: 政治制度化), commonly known as political institutionalization or political institutionalisation, refers to the founding, arrangement, and codification of the states' various institutions, generally via constitution-making or some other constitutional mechanisms. It is the process by which political structures and practices take root.

== Definition ==
Political institutionalization means that political initiatives have been increasingly constrained by both formal and informal rules or norms. Through the process of political institutionalization, the state-society nexus has been enhanced.

Samuel Huntington defines political institutionalization as "the process by which organizations and procedures acquire value and stability", and regards it as equivalent to political development.
