= Lyle Franklin Lane =

American diplomat

United States Ambassador to Uruguay
- In office 17 October 1979 – 22 July 1980
- President: Jimmy Carter
- Preceded by: Lawrence Pezzulo
- Succeeded by: Thomas Aranda Jr.

United States Ambassador to Paraguay
- In office 9 September 1980 – 21 May 1982
- President: Jimmy Carter; Ronald Reagan
- Preceded by: Robert E. White
- Succeeded by: Arthur H. Davis Jr.

Chief of the U.S. Interests Section in Cuba
- In office 1 September 1977 – 1979
- President: Jimmy Carter
- Preceded by: Office established
- Succeeded by: Wayne S. Smith

Personal details
- Born: September 19, 1926 Tacoma, Washington, U.S.
- Died: December 26, 2013 (aged 87) Los Angeles, California, U.S.
- Resting place: Albuquerque, New Mexico; 35.16895°N 106.38155°W
- Spouse: Jaclyn Fuller
- Education: University of Washington (1950); George Washington University (1969)
- Occupation: Diplomat

Lyle Franklin Lane (September 19, 1926 – December 26, 2013) was a United States diplomat.

Among his overseas posts Ambassador Lane served as the first Chief of Mission of the United States Interests Section in Havana (heading the return of U.S. diplomats to Cuba in 1977), United States Ambassador to Uruguay, and United States Ambassador to Paraguay.

Ambassador Lane was married to D. Jaclyn Fuller.

== Biography ==
A career diplomat, Lyle Lane joined the United States Foreign Service in 1952. His overseas postings include:

- International Affairs Adviser. In Ambassador Lane's final post he served as International Affairs Adviser to the Commander-in-Chief of U.S. Atlantic Command (CINCLANT) and NATO's Supreme Allied Commander Atlantic (SACLANT) Admiral Wesley L. McDonald (1982-1985)
- United States Ambassador to Paraguay (1980–82)
- United States Ambassador to Uruguay (1979–80)
- First Head of Mission to United States Interests Section in Havana (1977–79)
- United States Deputy Chief of Mission and later Chargé d'affaires to Peru (1976–77)
- United States Deputy Chief of Mission and later Chargé d'affaires to Costa Rica (1972–76)
- Regional Office of Central American Projects (ROCAP) Guatemala (1966–68)
- United States Principal Officer of Consulate, Cebu, Philippines (1962–66)
- United States Diplomatic Political Officer and Aid to Ambassador John Davis Lodge, Madrid, Spain (1955–59)
- United States Consul, Guayaquil, Ecuador (1953–55)

Ambassador Lane received degrees from University of Washington (B.S. 1950), University of California at Berkeley (1962) and George Washington University (M.S. 1969). At U.W. he was a member of Chi Phi fraternity.

=== Havana ===
The US broke diplomatic relations with Cuba on January 3, 1961, formally due to a disagreement about staffing levels at the respective Embassies. U.S. President Dwight D. Eisenhower stated at the time, "There is a limit to what the United States in self-respect can endure. That limit has now been reached". Protective powers were appointed to represent each country in the capital of the other. The US was represented by Switzerland in Havana, and the Cubans by Czechoslovakia in Washington. These offices, sections of the respective embassies, were staffed by Swiss and Czechoslovak diplomats.

US and Cuban Interests Sections staffed by actual US and Cuban diplomats were mutually agreed upon in 1977 after the Carter Administration took office and decided to seek normalization of relations with Cuba. US officials replaced the Swiss in the US Interests Section in Havana on September 1, 1977. Both under the Swiss and later with US staff, the Section has occupied the former United States Embassy building on Havana's Malecon which was designed by Harrison & Abramovitz architects and originally entered into service in 1953. When relations were broken in 1961, the building was occupied, and its contents safeguarded, by the Swiss Embassy personnel who handled US Interests in Cuba on behalf of the US Government as the protecting power until the arrival of the US staff in 1977.

The Swiss staff included some of the Foreign Service national employees (Cuban citizens) who were working at the US Embassy when relations were broken. Sixteen years later, when the US Government resumed its presence, many of them remained and resumed their direct employment. Most of the local hires employed by the Swiss also continued their employment. New hires were obtained through CUBALSE, the Cuban Government enterprise that serviced diplomatic missions.

The initial American staffing of the Section consisted of ten State Department Officials and a plain clothes US Marine guard detachment. By mutual agreement, the Cubans had an equal number of staff in Washington. Lyle Franklin Lane was the first Chief of the Interests Section in Havana.

Our Man in Havana Finds Some Things the Same:
HAVANA, Aug. 31 (AP) The first United States diplomat to set up shop in Cuba in more than 16 years toured the old American Embassy today and found it a storehouse of 1950's nostalgia

— September 1, 1977, New York Times,

Scholarly U.S. Diplomat; Lyle Franklin Lane:
In describing Lyle Lane, who opened Washington's first permanent diplomatic mission in Havana in 16 years yesterday, colleagues and friends spoke foremost of his discretion

— September 2, 1977, New York Times,

== Citations ==
- Cuba and the United States: A Chronological History By Jane Franklin
- The Destruction of a Nation: United States' Policy Towards Angola Since 1945 By George Wright
- Imperial State and Revolution: The United States and Cuba, 1952-1986 By Morris H. Morley
- Reversing Relations with Former Adversaries: U.S. Foreign Policy After the Cold War By C. Richard Nelson, Kenneth Weisbrode
- United Nations Treaty Collention
- United Nations Treaty Collention

Diplomatic posts
Preceded by Lawrence Pezzulo	United States Ambassador to Uruguay; 1979–1980	Succeeded by N. Shaw Smith
Preceded by Robert E. White	United States Ambassador to Paraguay; 1980–1982	Succeeded by Arthur H. Davis Jr.
