= Yamate (disambiguation) =

Yamate is a neighborhood in Yokohama.

Yamate may also refer to:

- Yamate Station, a station in Yokohama
- Yamate, Okayama, a former village

== People ==
- Yamate (山手), a character from the novel series A Certain Magical Index
- Kiichirō Yamate (山手樹一郎, 1899–1978), Japanese novelist who wrote Momotarō-zamurai
- Kyoko Yamate (山手響子), a character from the media franchise D4DJ
- Midori Yamate (山手翠), a character from the manga series Uwasa no Midori-kun!!
- Robert T. Yamate (born 1950), American diplomat
- Yui Yamate (山手由), a character from the manga series Hanasakeru Seishōnen

== See also ==
- Yamanote, an area in Tokyo contrasted with Shitamachi
- Yamanote Line, a railway line in Japan written with the same kanji
