= Wanda Nesbitt =

American diplomat (born 1956)

Wanda L. Nesbitt
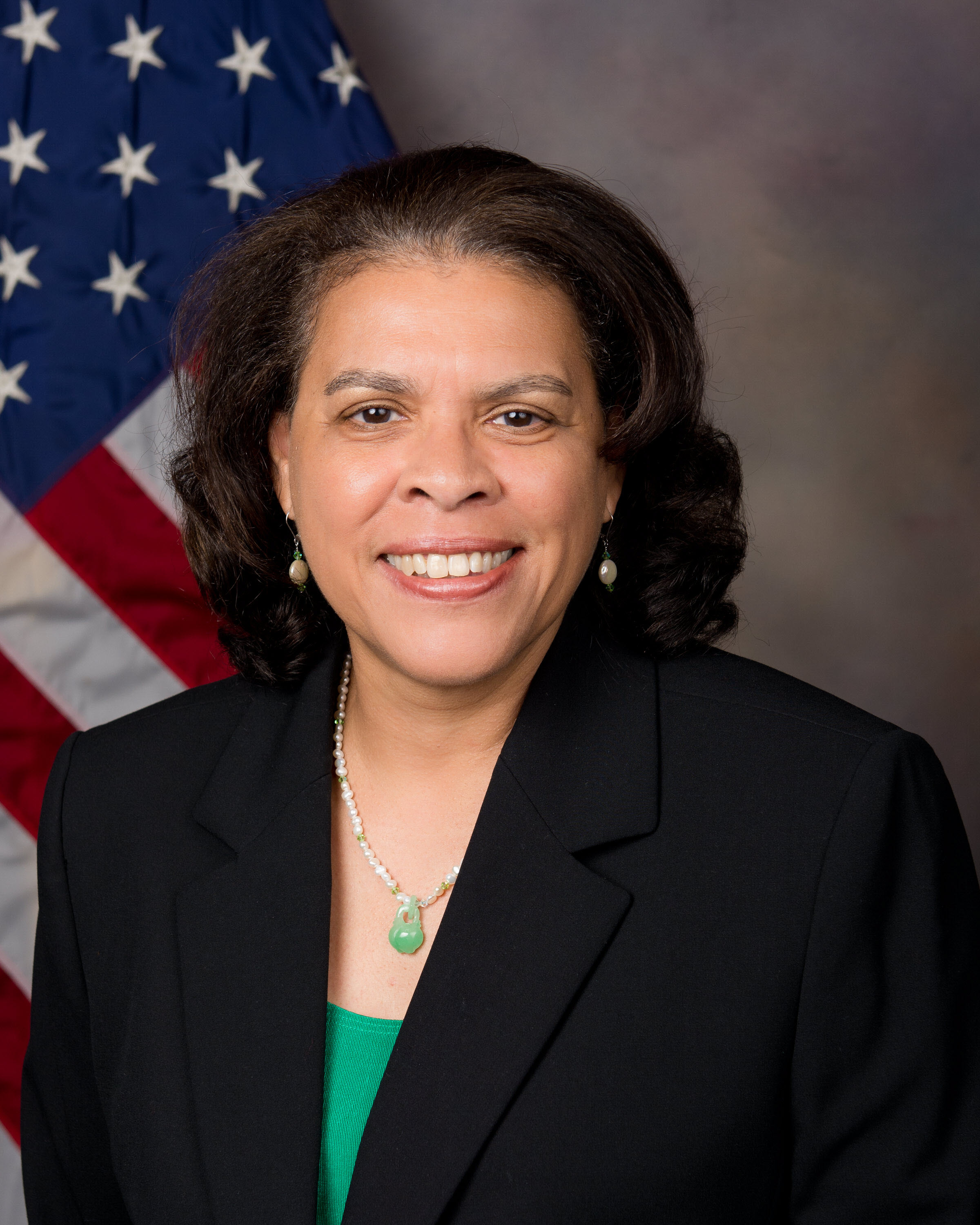

United States Ambassador to Namibia
- In office November 24, 2010 – November 15, 2013
- President: Barack Obama
- Preceded by: Gail D. Mathieu
- Succeeded by: Thomas F. Daughton

United States Ambassador to Ivory Coast
- In office November 6, 2007 – August 10, 2010
- President: George W. Bush; Barack Obama
- Preceded by: Aubrey Hooks
- Succeeded by: Phillip Carter III

United States Ambassador to Madagascar
- In office January 28, 2002 – June 23, 2004
- President: George W. Bush
- Preceded by: Shirley Elizabeth Barnes
- Succeeded by: James D. McGee

Personal details
- Born: December 7, 1956 (age 69) Philadelphia
- Spouse: James Stejskal
- Education: University of Pennsylvania
- Occupation: Foreign Service Officer

Wanda Letitia Nesbitt (born December 7, 1956) is a United States diplomat. A career Foreign Service officer, she has been appointed U.S Ambassador to several countries. From November 2013 to October 2017, she served as senior vice president of the National Defense University.

== Education ==
Nesbitt is from Philadelphia, Pennsylvania. She attended the Philadelphia High School for Girls. She graduated from the University of Pennsylvania with a degree in international relations and French. She also attended the National War College.

== Career ==
From January 2002 to August 2004, Nesbitt was the United States Ambassador to Madagascar, the United States Ambassador to Cote d'Ivoire from 2007-2010 and was appointed United States Ambassador to Namibia on September 24, 2010.

She was succeeded as US Ambassador to Namibia by Thomas F. Daughton, who was sworn in on October 6, 2014.

Diplomatic posts
Preceded by Shirley Elizabeth Barnes	United States Ambassador to Madagascar; 2002–2004	Succeeded by James D. McGee
Preceded by Aubrey Hooks	United States Ambassador to Ivory Coast; 2007–2010	Succeeded by Phillip Carter III
Preceded by Gail D. Mathieu	United States Ambassador to Namibia; 2010–2013	Succeeded by Thomas F. Daughton
