= Embassy of the United States, Havana =

American diplomatic mission in the capital of Cuba

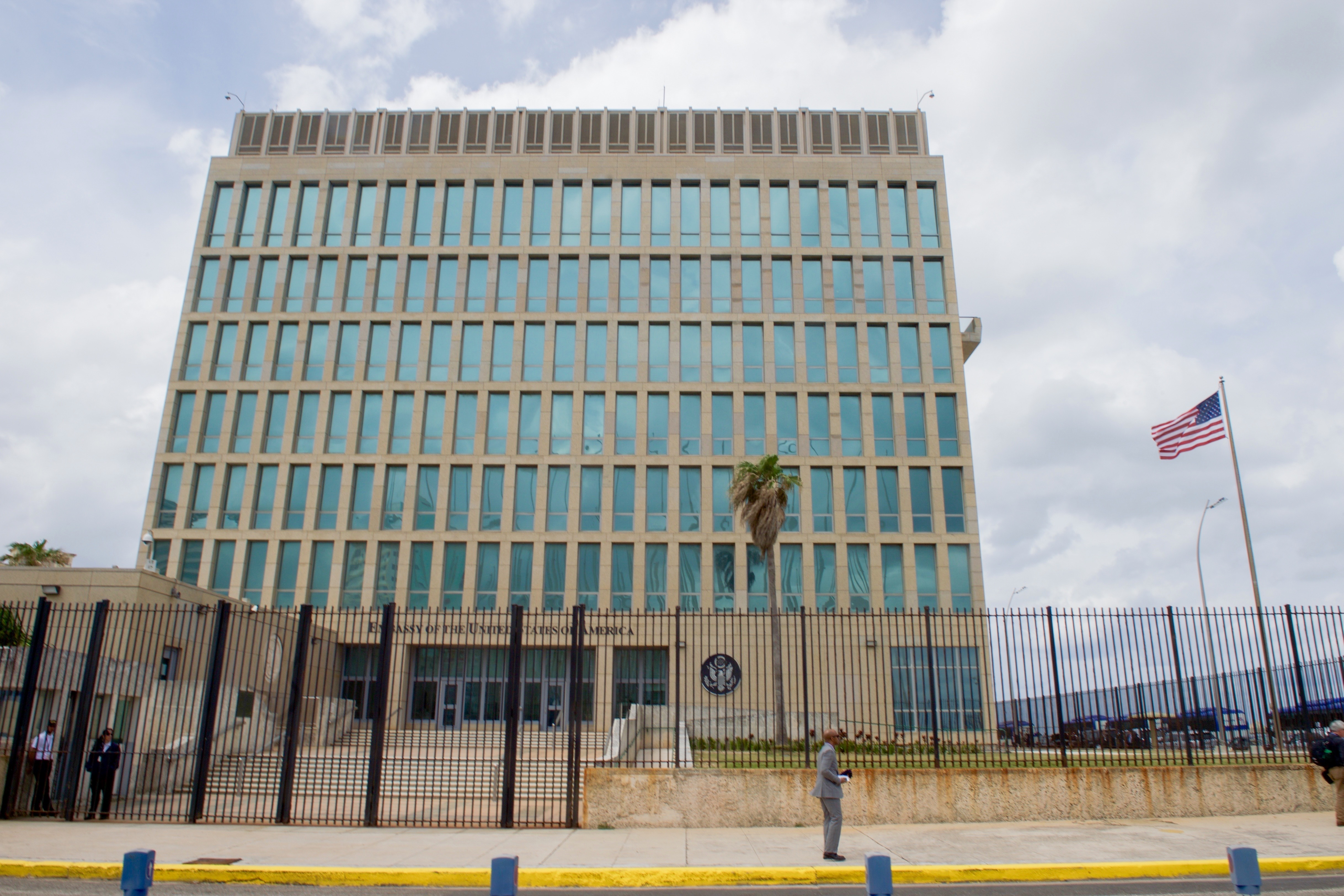
- The U.S. Embassy in Havana in 2016
- Address: 55 Calzada, La Habana, Cuba
- Coordinates: 23.14587°N 82.38765°W
- Chargé d'affaires: Mike Hammer

The Embassy of the United States of America in Havana (Spanish: Embajada de los Estados Unidos de América, La Habana) is the United States of America's diplomatic mission in Cuba. On January 3, 1961, U.S. president Dwight D. Eisenhower severed relations following the Cuban Revolution of the 1950s. In 1977, U.S. president Jimmy Carter and Cuban leader Fidel Castro signed an Interests Sections Agreement that permitted each government to operate from its former embassy in Havana and Washington D.C., which were called Interests Sections; they were prohibited from flying their respective flags. First Secretary of the Communist Party of Cuba Raúl Castro and U.S. president Barack Obama restored full diplomatic connections on July 20, 2015 during the Cuban thaw.

The building housed the United States Interests Section in Havana between 1977 and 2015, which operated under the auspices of the Swiss Embassy (acting as protecting power). On July 1, 2015, it was announced that with the resumption of diplomatic ties, the building would resume its role as the U.S. Embassy in Cuba on July 20, 2015. The embassy has been overseen by Chargé d'Affaires Mike Hammer since 2024.

== History ==
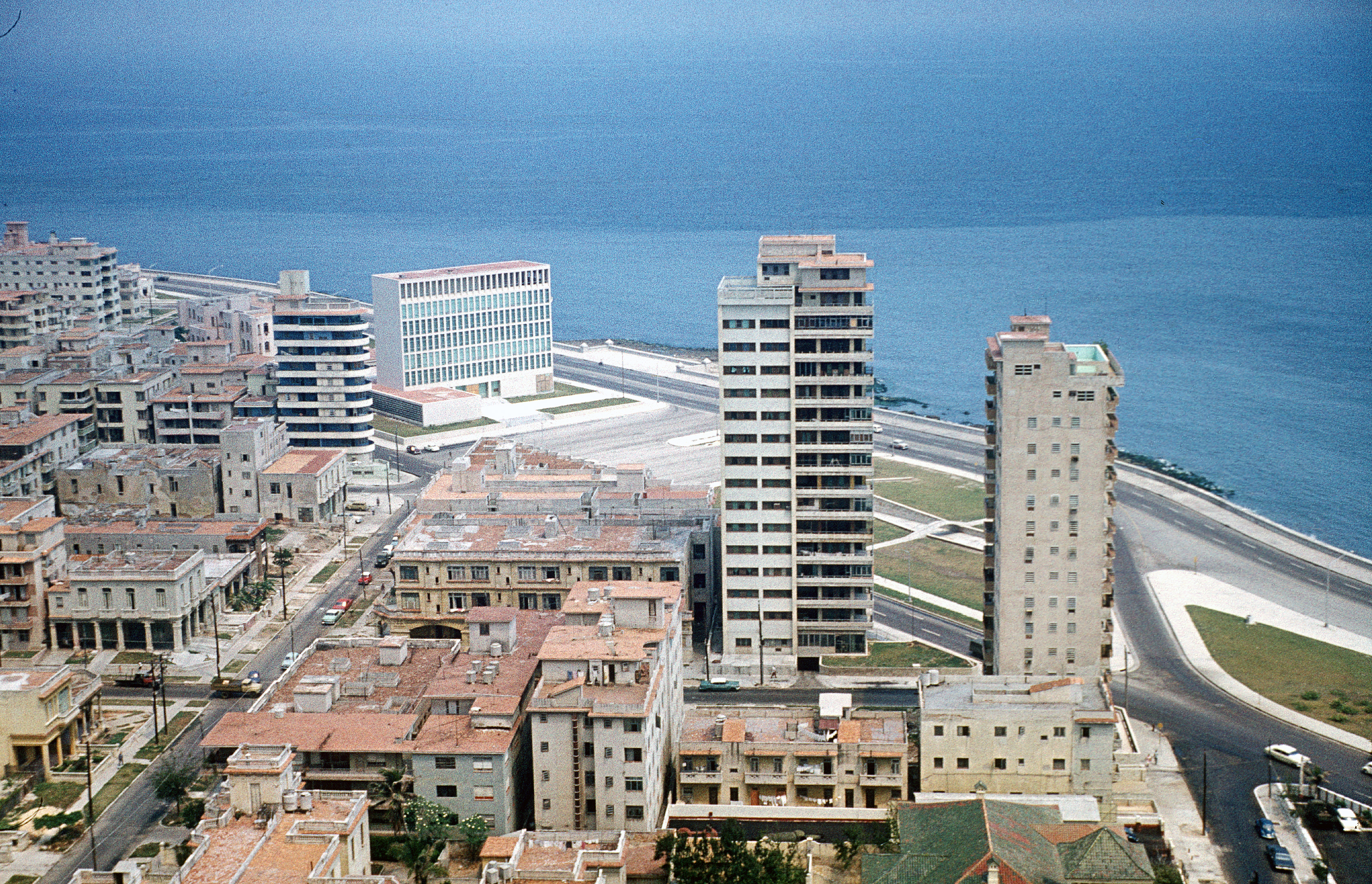
Embassy on the Malecón in the distance beyond the José Martí Anti-Imperialist Platform, in 1973.

The current embassy was designed in the Modernist-Brutalist style by the architectural firm Harrison & Abramovitz. The seven-story concrete and glass building was completed in 1953. The gardens were designed by Californian landscape architect Thomas Dolliver Church. The contractor for the building was Jaime Alberto Mitrani, PE, also a professor of civil engineering at the University of Havana. The embassy complex is located directly on the Malecón facing the José Martí Anti-Imperialist Platform and in proximity to the Cuban Ministry of Foreign Affairs.

After the U.S. diplomatic mission became defunct in 1961, the building was not used by American personnel until the opening of the interests section on September 1, 1977. In 1963, Prime Minister of Cuba Fidel Castro ordered the confiscation of the complex, but action was never taken by the Cuban government, though it still claimed right to the property in 2012. During the period that the complex served as an interests section, the U.S. was represented by Switzerland, and the Swiss maintained both the embassy complex and its effects. Renovations were completed on the complex in 1997.

The building was upgraded from an interests section and returned to its original role as the United States Embassy in Cuba, on July 20, 2015. On August 14, 2015, U.S. Secretary of State John Kerry officially reopened it; eight congressional lawmakers involved in the policy change attended, and the three Marines (Larry C. Morris, Mike East and Jim Tracy) who had lowered the U.S. flag at the embassy 54 years earlier presented a new flag, which was then raised by Marines assigned to the post. After the emergence of Havana syndrome in 2017, the United States withdrew most of the personnel from the embassy, so by July 2018 only 10 American diplomats were left to maintain the diplomatic service. The reduction of staffing also resulted in declining availability of embassy services. The Biden Administration planned on expanding staff at the embassy to resume full scale processing of immigrant visa services in 2023.

In May 2022 a $28 million renovation project of the Embassy building was launched. The renovation project ran into several problems like visa issues for U.S. workers and technicians as well as supply shortages and fuel quality issues.

== Health-related incidents ==
In August 2017, reports began surfacing that Americans posted at the embassy had been subjected to health-related incidents, dating back to late 2016. Two dozen employees of the State Department reported experiencing what were referred to as "health attacks". The State Department determined that the health problems may have been the result of an attack or else exposure to an as-yet-unknown device, and did not believe the Cuban government is responsible. Affected individuals described mild brain damage similar to a concussion and symptoms such as temporary or permanent hearing loss, memory loss, and nausea. Speculation has centered around a sonic or ultrasonic weapon, but the scientific consensus is that the use of a sonic weapon is implausible. Timothy Leighton, an expert in ultrasonics, has said "If you're talking about a ray-gun rifle knocking out someone with ultrasound they can't hear at a hundred meters – that's not going to happen".

The United States expelled two Cuban diplomats in response to the attacks; the Cuban government offered to cooperate with the US in an investigation of the incidents. In September, the US State Department stated that it was removing non-emergency staff from the US embassy, and warned US citizens not to travel to Cuba. In October 2017, the Associated Press released what it claimed was a recording of the sound some embassy workers heard during the attacks. However, senior neurologists consulted by The Guardian suggested that the health incidents were probably psychosomatic complaints, of the kind commonly known as mass hysteria. In December 2017, investigators discovered abnormalities in the victims' brains. The white matter of the brains showed physical changes which doctors believe could not have been caused by sound. They are now avoiding the term "sonic" to describe the attacks and there is growing skepticism it was caused by a sonic device; rather, it's possible that the sound heard by victims was a by-product of the brain damage. In a 2018 paper published in JAMA, a team of medical researchers at the University of Pennsylvania all but ruled out a sonic weapon and said they could not find the source of the ailments experienced by the embassy staff. They said that the report by the Associated Press claiming researchers had found damage to white matter in the brains of the patients was wrong and that there was no such damage. In January 2019 a study of a recording of the sound heard by embassy staff was released by Alexander Stubbs, a graduate student at the University of California, Berkeley, and Fernando Montealegre-Zapata, a professor of sensory biology at the University of Lincoln. The study found that the sound matched the mating song of the Indies short-tailed cricket found around the Caribbean. The researchers did not examine the cause of the diplomats' ailments and did not rule out a sonic attack "at another point".

James Andrew Lewis, a former State Department official and intelligence expert, stated: "We know with 100% certainly that the embassies are under surveillance, and the technology being used could just be crude and over-powered"; he noted that health problems at the U.S. embassy in Moscow in the 1970s were thought to be linked to the use of microwave surveillance devices.

== See also ==
- Embassy of Cuba in Washington, D.C.
- Cuban thaw
- Havana syndrome
- Moscow Signal
- Yellow rain
- List of Brutalist structures
