= Shirley Elizabeth Barnes =

American diplomat

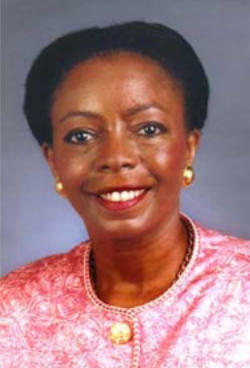

United States Ambassador to Madagascar
- In office June 29, 1998 – July 28, 2001
- President: Bill Clinton
- Preceded by: Vicki Huddleston
- Succeeded by: Wanda L. Nesbitt

Personal details
- Born: 1938 (age 87–88)
- Education: Baruch College, Columbia University, National War College

Shirley Elizabeth Barnes (born April 5, 1938) is a former United States diplomat and a career Foreign Service officer. She was appointed United States Ambassador to Madagascar from June 29, 1998, to July 28, 2001.

== Life ==
Barnes was born on April 5, 1938, in St. Augustine, Florida. When she was five years old, her family moved to Saratoga, New York.

== Education ==
In 1956 she graduated from Baruch College with a bachelor's degree in business. During her college years, she joined the Delta Sigma Theta sorority, the National Association for the Advancement of Colored People (NAACP), and became fluent in French.

She later studied International Affairs at Boston University. She received a master's degree in business administration from Columbia University in 1970.

She was a part of the Senior Seminar Class of the National War College graduating in 1995.

== Career ==
Before joining the Foreign Service, Barnes became vice president in several major advertising agencies and worked for the Ford Foundation from 1961- 1965 in the Republic of Congo, Kinshasa. After returning to the U.S. in 1965, she worked for the historic African-American Institute in New York City.

In 1984, Barnes joined the U.S. Foreign Service and became a General Services Officer at the U.S. Embassy in Egypt. She was promoted in 1986 to the Supervisor for the General Services Office at the Embassy in Senegal. From 1990 to 1992, Barnes worked as a Counselor for Administration in East Berlin, Germany.

Barnes was the director of Western European affairs in the Bureau of European Affairs at the United States Department of State and served as a diplomat in West Berlin, Cairo, Sofia, and Dakar. She was also consul general in Strasbourg, France.

In 1998, Barnes became the U.S. Ambassador to Madagascar and served until her retirement in 2001.

In 2004 she founded the Barnes Findley Foundation, a non-profit foundation dedicated to supporting women and girls in the African Diaspora with an emphasis on anti-human trafficking and economic empowerment.

Barnes received an honorary doctor of laws degree in 2006 from Knox College.

She is a member of the Delta Sigma Theta sorority and the American Foreign Service Association. She is also an avid patron of African art and speaks French.

Diplomatic posts
Preceded by Vicki Huddleston	United States Ambassador to Madagascar; 1998–2001	Succeeded by Wanda L. Nesbitt
