= Michael P. Pelletier =

American diplomat

The Honorable Michael P. Pelletier
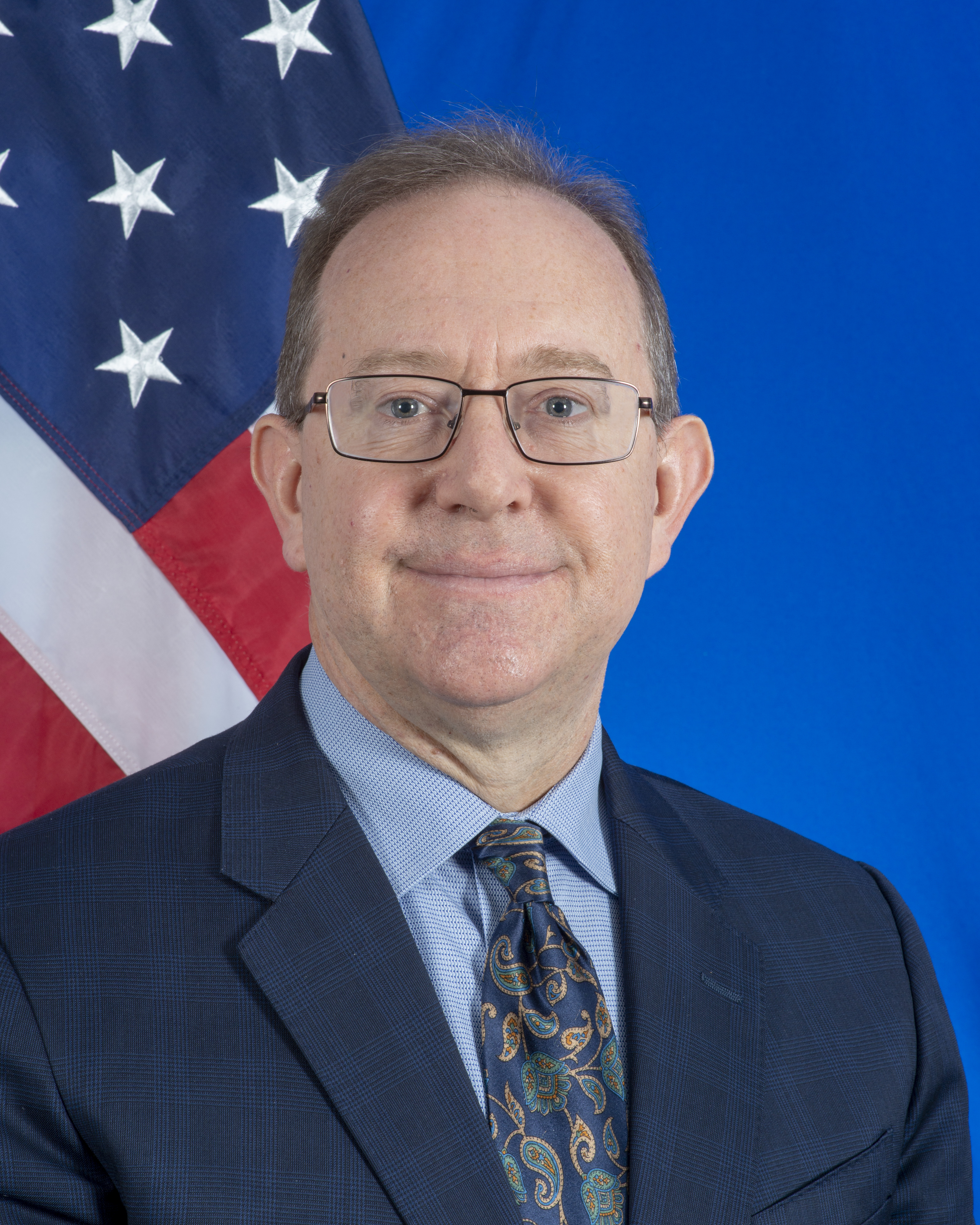

United States Ambassador to Madagascar and Comoros
- In office March 5, 2019 – June 18, 2021
- President: Donald Trump; Joe Biden
- Preceded by: Robert T. Yamate
- Succeeded by: Claire A. Pierangelo

Personal details
- Education: Georgetown University (BSFS); Institut d’Etudes Politiques (Certificat d’Etudes Politiques); Columbia University (MIA)

Michael Peter Pelletier is an American diplomat who served as the United States ambassador to Madagascar and the Comoros from 2019 to 2021.

== Early life and education ==
Pelletier was raised in Maine. He earned a B.S.F.S. from Georgetown University, a Certificat d’Etudes Politiques from Institut d’Etudes Politiques, Paris, France, and a Master of International Affairs from Columbia University.

== Career ==
Pelletier, a career member of the Senior Foreign Service, class of Minister-Counselor, has served as an American diplomat since 1987. He has served at eight United States Missions overseas and in senior leadership positions at the United States Department of State, including as Deputy Chief of Mission at the United States embassy in New Delhi, India, and Deputy Assistant Secretary in the Bureau of African Affairs.

From 2016 to 2019, he was the Dean of the School of Professional and Area Studies at the Foreign Service Institute.

He is the recipient of thirteen senior State Department awards, including a Presidential Meritorious Service Award and the Linguist of the Year.

On August 13, 2018, President Donald Trump announced his intent to nominate Pelletier to be the next ambassador to Madagascar and Comoros. On January 2, 2019, his nomination was confirmed by the United States Senate. He presented his credentials to President Andry Rajoelina on March 5, 2019 and to President Azali Assoumani on June 24, 2019.

In 2021 Pelletier was appointed as the Executive Director of the Institute for Global Engagement at the University of Houston.

Diplomatic posts
| Preceded by Robert T. Yamate | United States Ambassador to Madagascar & Comoros; 2019–2020 | Succeeded by Claire A. Pierangelo |
