= Claire A. Pierangelo =

American diplomat

Claire Pierangelo
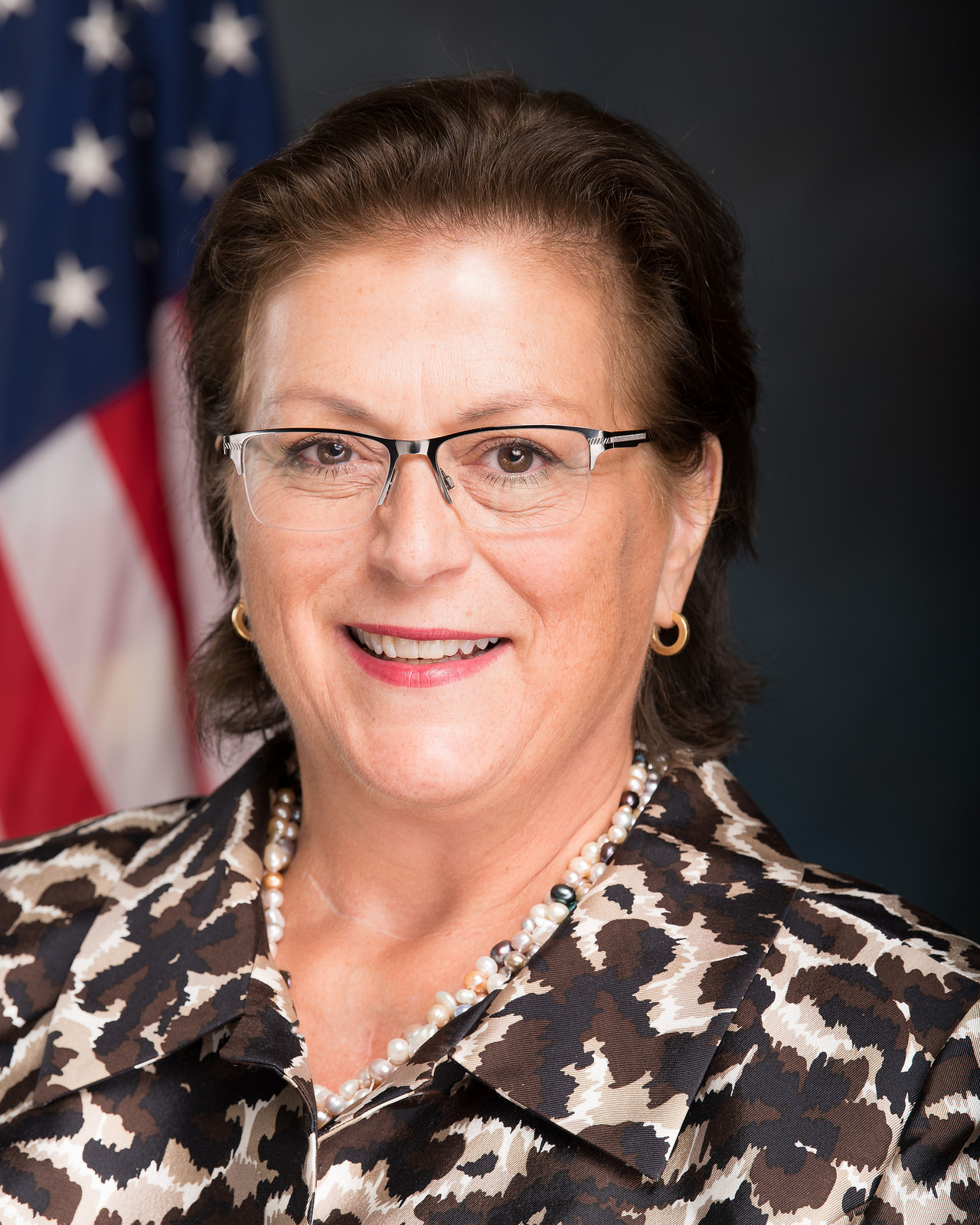

United States Ambassador to Madagascar and Comoros
- In office June 29, 2022 – January 29, 2026
- President: Joe Biden; Donald Trump
- Preceded by: Michael Pelletier

Personal details
- Education: University of California, Santa Cruz (BA); National Defense University (MS); Johns Hopkins University (MA)

Claire A. Pierangelo is an American diplomat who had served as the United States ambassador to Madagascar and the Comoros.

== Education ==
Pierangelo earned a Bachelor of Arts from the University of California, Santa Cruz, Master of Science in National Security and Resource Strategy from the Dwight D. Eisenhower School for National Security and Resource Strategy of the National Defense University, and a Master of Arts from the Paul H. Nitze School of Advanced International Studies of Johns Hopkins University.

== Career ==
A career member of the Senior Foreign Service, Pierangelo served as the deputy chief of mission of the U.S. Embassy in Hanoi, Vietnam (from 2011 to 2015) in addition to other positions, including multiple assignments in the Bureau of European and Eurasian Affairs in the U.S. State Department and service as principal officer at the U.S. Consulate General, Surabaya, Indonesia. She also served as director of the office of performance evaluation in the Bureau of Human Resources. She was also an assistant professor at the National Defense University. She served as the principal officer at the U.S. Consulate General in Lagos, Nigeria. During her time in Vietnam, she helped bring in US companies and aid in the eradication of Agent Orange in Vietnam, leftover from the war. Along with aid in the disposing of unexploded ordnance along the Ho Chi Minh Trail.

=== Ambassador to Madagascar ===
On June 24, 2021, President Joe Biden nominated Pierangelo to be the next United States Ambassador to Madagascar and Comoros. On September 30, 2021, a hearing on her nomination was held before the Senate Foreign Relations Committee. On October 19, 2021, her nomination was reported favorably out of committee. Her nomination was confirmed by the entire Senate via voice vote on March 2, 2022. She presented her credentials to President Andry Rajoelina on June 29, 2022.

== Personal life ==
She speaks Italian, Indonesian, Vietnamese, French, Haitian Creole, and some Spanish.

Diplomatic posts
Preceded by Michael Pelletier	United States Ambassador to Madagascar & the Comoros; 2022–2026	Vacant
