= Vicki J. Huddleston =

American diplomat (born 1942)

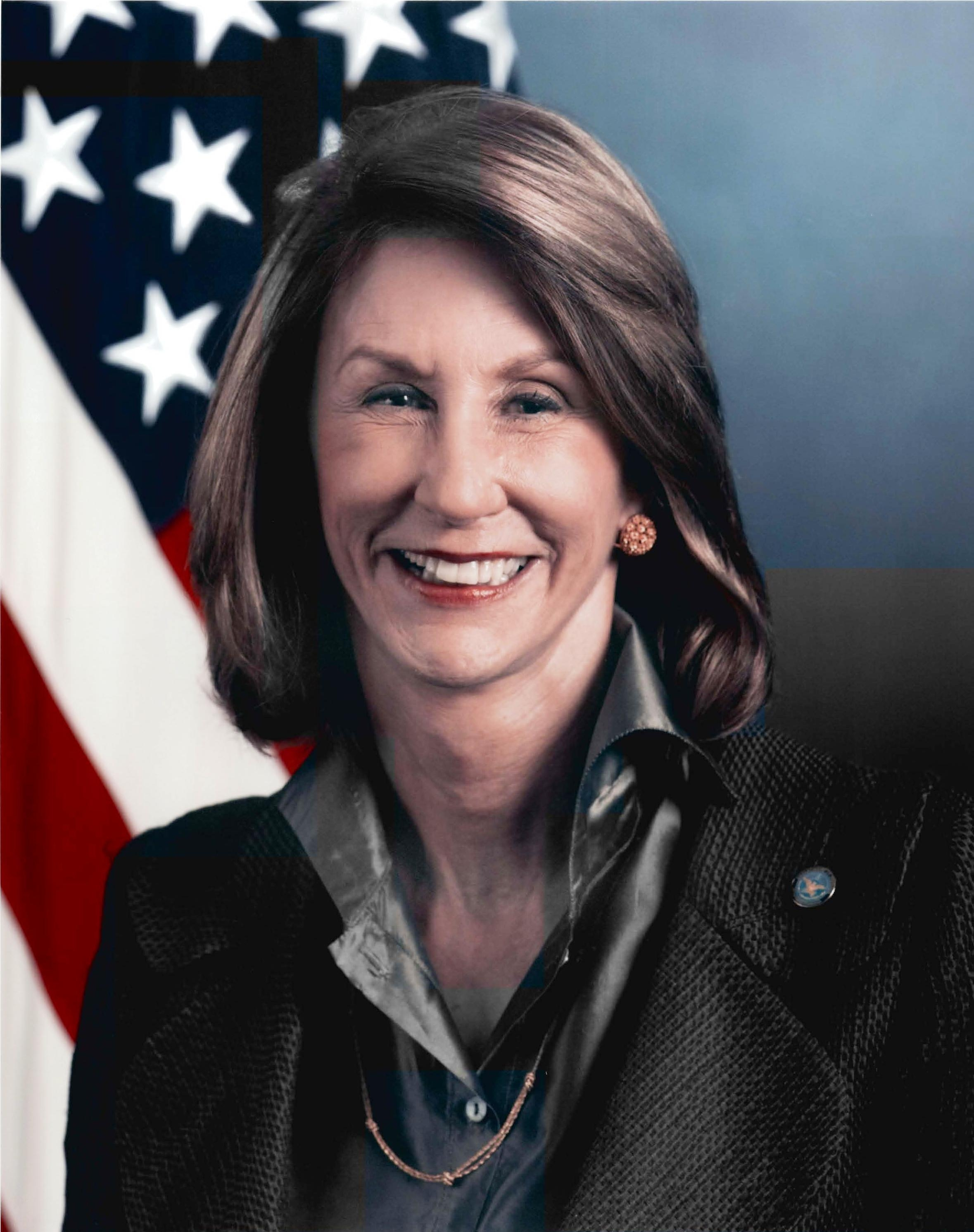

United States Ambassador to Mali
- In office December 9, 2002 – January 21, 2005
- President: George W. Bush
- Preceded by: Michael Edward Ranneberger
- Succeeded by: Terence Patrick McCulley

United States Ambassador to Madagascar
- In office December 12, 1995 – July 24, 1997
- President: Bill Clinton
- Preceded by: Dennis P. Barrett
- Succeeded by: Shirley Elizabeth Barnes

Charge d’Affaires ad interim to Haiti
- In office July 1993 – October 13, 1993
- Preceded by: Leslie M. Alexander (Charge d’Affaires ad interim)
- Succeeded by: William Lacy Swing (as ambassador)

Personal details
- Born: 1942 (age 83–84)
- Education: University of Colorado, Johns Hopkins University

Vicki J. Huddleston (born 1942) is a retired U.S. diplomat who served as Ambassador to Mali, and U.S. Ambassador to Madagascar.

== Career ==
Ambassador Huddleston is a retired career Senior Foreign Service Officer whose last assignment was as U.S. Deputy Assistant Secretary of Defense for African Affairs in the Office of the Secretary of Defense from June 2009 through December 2011. Before that she was Chargé d'Affaires ad interim to Ethiopia, United States Ambassador to Mali, Principal Officer of the U.S. Interests Section in Havana, Deputy Assistant Secretary of State for African Affairs, and U.S. Ambassador to Madagascar. She was Chief of United States Interests Section in Havana from 1999 to 2002 and was earlier the Deputy and then the Coordinator of the Office of Cuban Affairs. Prior to joining the Department of Defense, she was a visiting scholar at Brookings Institution. She was Chief of Party for a USAID-funded capacity building project in Haiti from 2013 to 2015.

Ambassador Huddleston was a Fellow at the Institute of Politics of the Harvard University Kennedy School of Government and an American Political Science Association Congressional Fellow on the staff of Senator Jeff Bingaman (D-NM). She began her overseas career as a Peace Corps volunteer in Peru. She also worked for the American Institute for Free Labor Development (AIFLD) in Peru and Brazil. Additional assignments as a career Foreign Service Officer include economic and consular officer in Sierra Leone, economic officer in Mali, Office of Mexican Affairs, and the Bureau of International Organization Affairs. After attending the University of Arizona for a year, she transferred to the University of Colorado Boulder where she received a Bachelor of Arts in 1964. She then earned a master's degree from the Johns Hopkins School of Advanced International Studies.

She has received U.S. Department of State awards, including a Distinguished Honor Award and a Presidential Meritorious Service Award. In 2008, she was a member of the Obama-Biden Transition Team for the U.S. Department of State. She is the co-author of "Learning to Salsa: New Steps in U.S.-Cuba Relations," and opinion pieces in The New York Times, The Miami Herald, and The Washington Post. She is a former commentator for NBC-Universal. She currently speaks and provides commentary on Cuba and Africa.

Huddleston is currently a Consultant to the Transnational Strategy Group, within their Cuba Business Advisory Practice Group.

== Personal life ==
Ambassador Huddleston lives in Santa Fe, New Mexico, and is married to a retired US Foreign Service officer; they have two children, Robert and Alexandra.

== Works ==
- Learning to salsa : new steps in U.S.-Cuba relations, Washington, D.C. : Brookings Institution Press, 2010. ISBN 9780815703891, OCLC 896133389
- Our Woman in Havana: a diplomat's chronicle of America's long struggle with Castro's Cuba. Woodstock: Overlook, 2018. ISBN 9781468315790, OCLC 1019634557

Diplomatic posts
Preceded by Dennis P. Barrett	United States Ambassador to Madagascar; 1995–1996	Succeeded by Shirley Elizabeth Barnes
Preceded by Michael E. Ranneberger	United States Ambassador to Mali; 2002–2005	Succeeded by Terence McCulley
