= List of ambassadors of the United States to Madagascar =

Ambassador of the United States to Madagascar and Comoros
- Seal of the United States Department of State

- Flag of a United States ambassador

- Incumbent; Tom Bevan; Chargé d'Affaires ad interim since August 13, 2026
- Nominator: The president of the United States
- Appointer: The president; with Senate advice and consent
- Inaugural holder: Frederic P. Bartlett as Ambassador Extraordinary and Plenipotentiary
- Formation: August 27, 1960
- Website: U.S. Embassy - Antananarivo

This is a list of United States ambassadors to Madagascar. The United States has maintained diplomatic relations since June 1960. The embassy in Tananarive (now Antananarivo) was established on June 26, 1960. Currently, the ambassador also serves US diplomatic interests or relations to Comoros.

== Ambassadors ==
Note: Embassy Tananarive (now Antananarivo) was established June 26, 1960.

Name	Title	Appointed	Presented credentials	Terminated mission	Notes
Frederic P. Bartlett - Career FSO	Ambassador Extraordinary and Plenipotentiary	August 27, 1960	October 5, 1960	June 6, 1962	
C. Vaughan Ferguson, Jr. - Career FSO	Ambassador Extraordinary and Plenipotentiary	December 17, 1962	January 15, 1963	May 21, 1966	
David S. King - Political appointee	Ambassador Extraordinary and Plenipotentiary	January 26, 1967	April 21, 1967	August 16, 1969	
Anthony D. Marshall - Political Appointee	Ambassador Extraordinary and Plenipotentiary	December 15, 1969	January 6, 1970	June 6, 1971	Departure requested by Government of the Malagasy Republic, June 1, 1971
Joseph Mendenhall - Career FSO	Ambassador Extraordinary and Plenipotentiary	September 11, 1972	November 15, 1972	May 11, 1975	Between 1975 and 1980, the following officers served as Chargé d'Affaires ad interim: Gilbert H. Sheinbaum (November 1975-March 1977) and Robert S. Barrett (March 1977-June 1980).
Fernando E. Rondon - Career FSO	Ambassador Extraordinary and Plenipotentiary	September 26, 1980	November 10, 1980	May 25, 1983	
Robert Brendon Keating - Political appointee	Ambassador Extraordinary and Plenipotentiary	July 6, 1983	August 11, 1983	May 1, 1986	
Patricia Gates Lynch - Political appointee	Ambassador Extraordinary and Plenipotentiary	June 16, 1986	August 6, 1986	August 31, 1989	
Howard K. Walker - Career FSO	Ambassador Extraordinary and Plenipotentiary	August 7, 1989	September 27, 1989	July 12, 1992	
Dennis P. Barrett - Career FSO	Ambassador Extraordinary and Plenipotentiary	June 15, 1992	December 3, 1992	November 12, 1995	
Vicki Huddleston - Career FSO	Ambassador Extraordinary and Plenipotentiary	October 3, 1995	December 12, 1995	July 24, 1997	Howard T. Perlow served as Chargé d'Affaires ad interim, July 1997-August 1998.
Shirley Elizabeth Barnes - Career FSO	Ambassador Extraordinary and Plenipotentiary	June 29, 1998	August 30, 1998	July 28, 2001	
Wanda L. Nesbitt - Career FSO	Ambassador Extraordinary and Plenipotentiary	November 5, 2001	January 28, 2002	June 23, 2004	
James D. McGee - Career FSO	Ambassador Extraordinary and Plenipotentiary	June 30, 2004	October 29, 2004	June 1, 2007	
R. Niels Marquardt - Career FSO	Ambassador Extraordinary and Plenipotentiary	May 30, 2007	August 22, 2007	June 7, 2010	
Eric M. Wong - Career FSO	Chargé d'Affaires ad interim	September 2011	Unknown	August 2014	
Robert T. Yamate - Career FSO	Ambassador Extraordinary and Plenipotentiary	November 19, 2014	December 19, 2014	April 1, 2018	
Michael Pelletier - Career FSO	Ambassador Extraordinary and Plenipotentiary	January 2, 2019	March 5, 2019	June 18, 2021	
Claire A. Pierangelo - Career FSO	Ambassador Extraordinary and Plenipotentiary	March 2, 2022	June 29, 2022	January 29, 2026	
Stephanie A. Arnold - Career FSO	Chargé d'Affaires ad interim	January 30, 2026		July 21, 2026	
Melanie Harris Higgins - Career FSO	Chargé d'Affaires ad interim	July 21, 2026		August 13, 2026	
Tom Bevan - Career FSO	Chargé d'Affaires ad interim	August 13, 2026		Present	

== See also ==
- Madagascar – United States relations
- Foreign relations of Madagascar
- Ambassadors of the United States
