= United States Interests Section in Havana =

De facto embassy of the U.S. in Havana, Cuba (1977-2015)

Chief of Mission of United States Interests Section of the Embassy of Switzerland in Havana, Cuba
- Seal of the United States Department of State
- Nominator: President of the United States
- Inaugural holder: Lyle Franklin Lane
- Formation: 1977
- Final holder: Jeffrey DeLaurentis
- Abolished: 2015
- Succession: Embassy of the United States, Havana

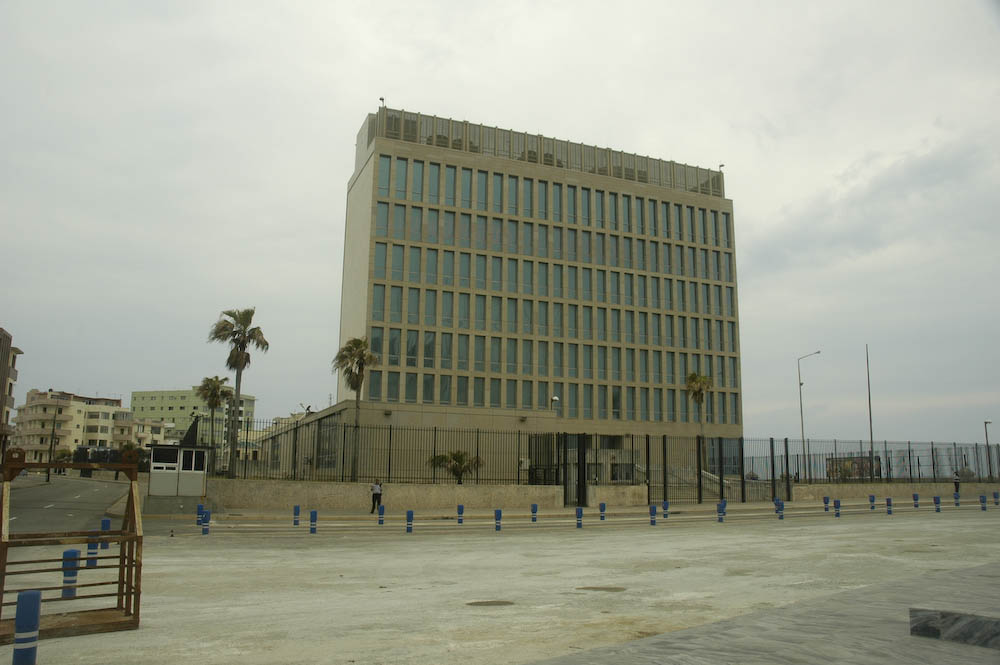
The United States Interests Section of the Embassy of Switzerland in Havana in February 2007. Between 1961 and 2015, Switzerland was the protecting power of the United States in Cuba.

The United States Interests Section of the Embassy of Switzerland in Havana, Cuba ("USINT Havana" in the State Department telegraphic address) represented United States interests in Cuba from September 1, 1977 to July 20, 2015. It was staffed by United States Foreign Service personnel and local staff employed by the US Department of State, and located in a multi-story office building on the Malecón across from the Plaza de la Revolución in Havana. The mission resumed its role as the Embassy of the United States in Cuba on July 20, 2015, following the normalization of diplomatic relations between the two countries.

USINT Havana formally operated under the protection of the Embassy of Switzerland while its counterpart, the Interests Section of the Republic of Cuba in Washington, until 1991, was formally a Section of the Embassy of Czechoslovakia, although they operated independently in virtually all but name and protocol respects. During this period, the United States and Cuba did not operate embassies in each other's countries, and their respective Interests Sections functioned as de facto embassies. Switzerland became the protecting power for both in 1991. The last Section Chief of USINT Havana was Jeffrey DeLaurentis, who served from August 2014 to its termination in 2015. He subsequently became chargé d'affaires of the embassy.

== History ==
The US broke diplomatic relations with Cuba on January 3, 1961, formally due to a disagreement about staffing levels at the respective embassies. US President Dwight D. Eisenhower stated at the time, "There is a limit to what the United States in self-respect can endure. That limit has now been reached". Protective powers were appointed to represent each country in the capital of the other. The US was represented by Switzerland in Havana, and the Cubans by Czechoslovakia in Washington. These offices, sections of the respective embassies, were staffed by Swiss and Czechoslovak diplomats.

US and Cuban Interests Sections staffed by actual US and Cuban diplomats were mutually agreed upon in 1977 in a Carter Administration initiative to seek normalization of relations with Cuba. Ten US Foreign Service Officers and their families and a ten person Marine Corps Guard Detachment replaced the Swiss personnel operating out of the US Interests Section of the Embassy of Switzerland in Havana on September 1, 1977. Both the Swiss and later with US staff, occupied the former United States Embassy building on Havana's Malecon which was designed by Harrison & Abramovitz architects and originally entered into service in 1953. When relations were broken in 1961, the building was occupied, and its contents safeguarded, by the Swiss diplomats who handled US interests in Cuba on behalf of the US Government as the protecting power until the arrival of the US staff in 1977.

The Swiss staff included some of the Foreign Service National employees who were working at the US Embassy when relations were broken. Sixteen years later, when the US Government resumed its presence, many of them remained. Virtually all of the local hires employed by the Swiss continued their employment. New hires were obtained through CUBALSE, a Cuban Government enterprise that provided personnel and other services to local diplomatic missions.

The initial American staffing of the Section consisted of ten State Department Officials and a plain clothes US Marine guard detachment. By mutual agreement, the Cubans had an equal number of staff in Washington. Lyle Franklin Lane was the first Chief of the Interests Section in Havana. When the advance team took over the building from the Swiss, they found items dating from the 1950s, including Eisenhower's photograph. Wayne Smith, who had closed the Embassy in 1961 as a young officer, and was instrumental in opening the interests Section as incoming Director of Cuban Affairs, replaced Lane in September 1979 when the entire US staff turned over after an initial two-year tour of duty.

=== Early years ===
After the initial bloom, bilateral relations deteriorated almost immediately as the extent of Cuban military involvement in Angola became clear to Washington. The first two years were a period of rebuilding contacts, dealing with the contents and condition of the building and the residence, repatriating dual national Americans and their families stranded in Cuba, securing the release of American prisoners held on political charges (including Lawrence K. Lunt, a suspected CIA agent), servicing a large and growing prisoner population of American common criminals including marijuana smugglers and hijackers, repatriating fugitive Americans who had hijacked US planes to Cuba and wanted to go home to face justice, and processing thousands of Cuban political prisoners released and allowed to leave Cuba if they could find a country that would take them. One issue not resolved was the repatriation of valuables including art and coin collections, exiting citizens had deposited with the Swiss with the knowledge of the USG. The Cubans agreed to shipping them out on the USG chartered planes that brought in the initial package of furniture, household effects and supplies but Consular Affairs, the responsible State Bureau, denied USINT permission to ship them pleading an insurmountable administrative burden Washington would have to assume. There were reports of damage to and pilfering of these valuable deposits.

In 1978 several fugitive US citizen hijackers were voluntarily repatriated to face justice in the US. The first attempt to send them out through Canada failed when the flight attendants on a regular Air Canada flight refused to fly with them even with a contingent of Mounted Police providing security. Alternate arrangements were soon made to fly them out on Cubana via Jamaica. The Cubans agreed to allow them to leave only if voluntary and without restraints. Once in Jamaica they were transferred to an FBI charter flight and moved to the US.

During the first two years of resumed US presence, only one US passenger aircraft was hijacked to Cuba from the US. President Castro went personally to the airport to manage the June 12, 1979, hijacking incident involving Delta Air Lines flight 1061, a Lockheed L-1011 Tristar piloted by Captain Vince Doda. It had been hijacked by Eduardo Guerra Jimenez, a former Cuban air force pilot who had hijacked a MiG jet to the United States 10 years earlier. Castro personally met with and briefed the US Consular Officer, Tom Holladay, who had been sent to the scene. Through Holladay, Castro assured the US Government that Cuba would adhere to the terms of the bilateral anti-hijacking agreement even though it was in suspension due to disagreements over US handling of Cuban boatjackers. When asked by his staff, Castro also authorized the passengers to purchase items from airport shops with hard currency. The aircraft and passengers returned to the US without delay or incident. Because it could not accept the Captain's Company credit cards, Cuba extended Delta credit for the refueling with Holladay's assurance that Delta was good for its money and the Interests Section would facilitate the payment from Delta via the Department of State OCS Trust mechanism. Delta transferred the funds immediately.

The Consular staff, inexperienced, and including very green locally hired staff and temporary duty personnel, including INS officers and local employees from the Embassy in Mexico, were overwhelmed by the initial heavy workload and the inadequate conditions but managed to keep the work flowing. The Immigrant visa workload was very heavy but not very productive. Thousands of approved immigrant petitions flowed in but few beneficiaries had permission to depart the country and those that did had no petitions.

In the aftermath of the "dialogo" between a group of prominent Miami Cubans, led by Bernardo Benes, and the Cuban government, secret bilateral talks were held in Mexico City in which Cuba agreed to release 2500 political prisoners at the rate of 500 per month and the US agreed to take them. The Cubans released the first tranche and an initial high-profile group, including Polita Grau and Tony Cuesta was moved to the US expeditiously. However, due to bureaucratic hangups about parole quotas, INS scheduling, and name checks it was soon apparent that the US could not process the prisoners fast enough to maintain the release schedule. The Cubans continued to release the prisoners as scheduled but the processing did not keep up mainly due to name check delays. By late August, the US was hopelessly behind in processing the released prisoners, some of whom had married after release. As the non-aligned meeting approached the Cubans threatened to set up a camp for the unprocessed prisoners in front of the Interest Section and drive the delegates to the international meeting past to show them how the US lives up to its commitments. Even this threat failed to accelerate the process although the Interests Section staff did all it could. Washington hang ups were slow to resolve but the Cubans did not set up the threatened camp.

=== Role during the Mariel Boatlift ===
In early 1979, as more and more Cubans were authorized to leave the country, and could not find countries, including the United States, that would admit them, the internal situation became increasingly unstable, eventually leading to the Mariel Boatlift in April 1980. The US government had led the Cuban government to believe that it would take most of the former political prisoners and their families it authorized to depart. However, it was not possible to fulfill this commitment. A large band of ex political prisoners with permission to leave and no place to go made daily rounds of the Embassies of Venezuela and Spain, as well as the US Interests Section, in search of visas. The Cuban government told the Interests Section it suspected that the US was attempting to destabilize the internal order of the country by using these desperate dissidents to fuel further popular discontent and warned that if immediate action to document these Cubans for emigration was not forthcoming, they would take matters into their own hands. They had done so before during the Johnson Administration when they opened the port of Camarioca to vessels from Miami picking up the relatives who wanted to leave. In that case the crisis was disarmed with the establishment of a formal orderly program to screen applicants and airlift the emigrants to the US. This program was terminated by the Nixon Administration leaving several thousand applicants unattended.

Although the Mariel Boatlift was partially a Cuban response to Western failure to take the dissident unadapted prisoners and ex prisoners out of Cuba, it was sparked by the removal of the Cuban security guards from the Embassy of Peru compound resulting in its being overrun by thousands of Cuban asylum seekers. Leaving the country was again in vogue as the US-Cuban relationship improved. Cuban members of divided families were encouraged to seek exit permission. For those for whom legal channels were not available, since early 1979, increasing numbers of Cubans had tried to gain access to Foreign Embassies in Havana to gain asylum and safe passage abroad. Large groups entered diplomatic compounds by jumping from adjacent buildings and by ramming gates and perimeter fences with buses and trucks. In such an attempt at the Embassy of Peru, a Cuban guard was killed by friendly fire. Cuba precipitously removed the perimeter guards and over ten thousand Cuban asylum seekers flooded the compound. Eventually 125,000 Cubans left the island in the ensuing months, mostly to the United States. Also during the Mariel period a large group of hundreds of Cuban ex-political prisoners and applicants to immigrate to the United States to rejoin family (civilians) waiting in front of the Interests Section was attacked by government employees in several buses and sought refuge inside the building. A junior Consular Officer, Susan Johnson, was accused of inciting the crowd on national TV and in Granma. The USG withdrew her to the Cuban desk in Washington (and she was expelled from Cuba as persona non grata). The Cubans had been secretly filming Consular crowd dispersal activities at the front entrance and used the film as evidence of incitement, but did not include the audio portion which would have shown that there was no incitement.

A renovation of the building was undertaken and finally completed in 1997, 20 years after the US Interests Section staff took occupancy.

== Propaganda battles ==
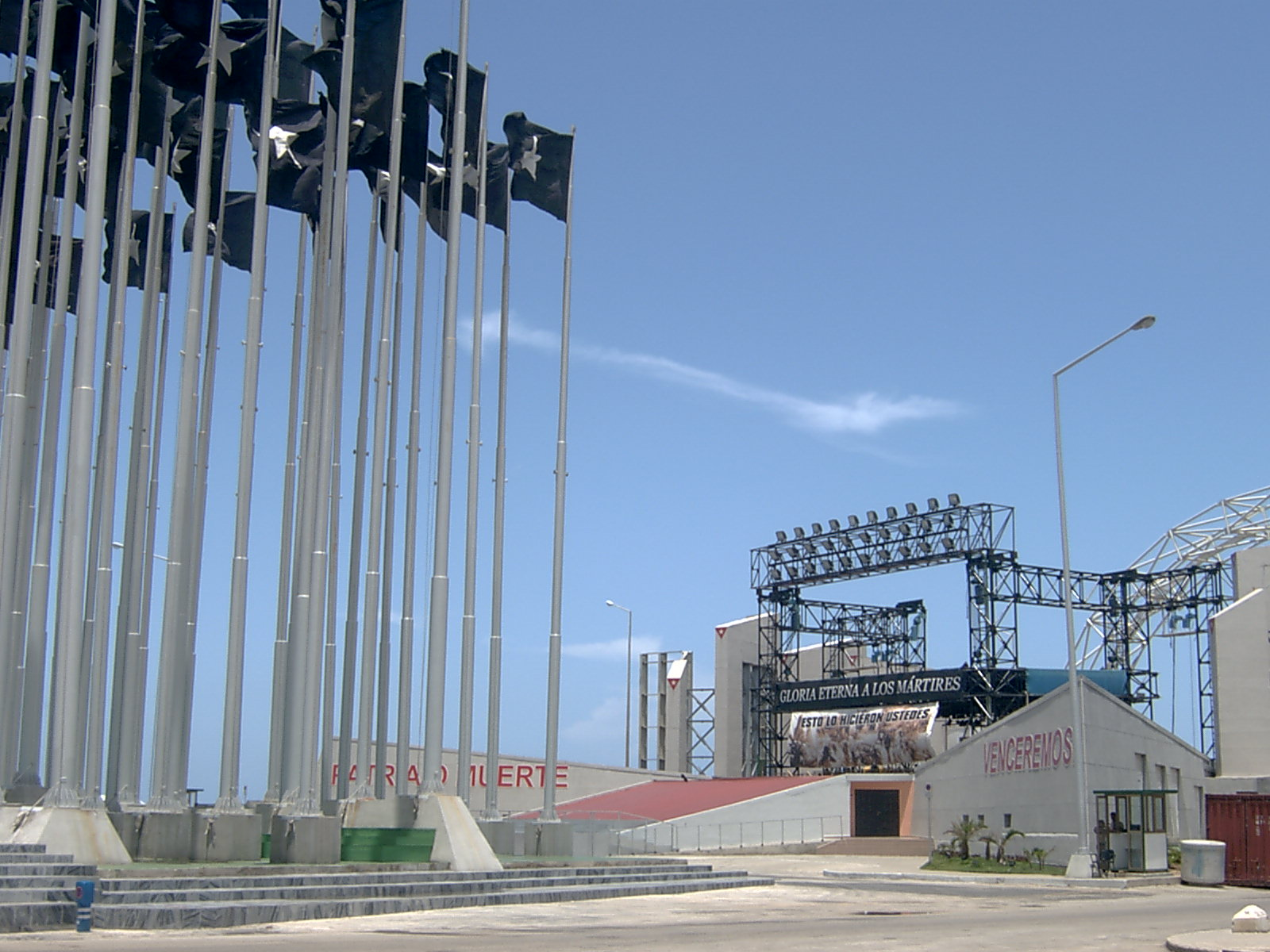
The "Mount of Flags" in "Anti-Imperialism Park" obscuring the US Interest Section's (now US Embassy's) electronic billboard

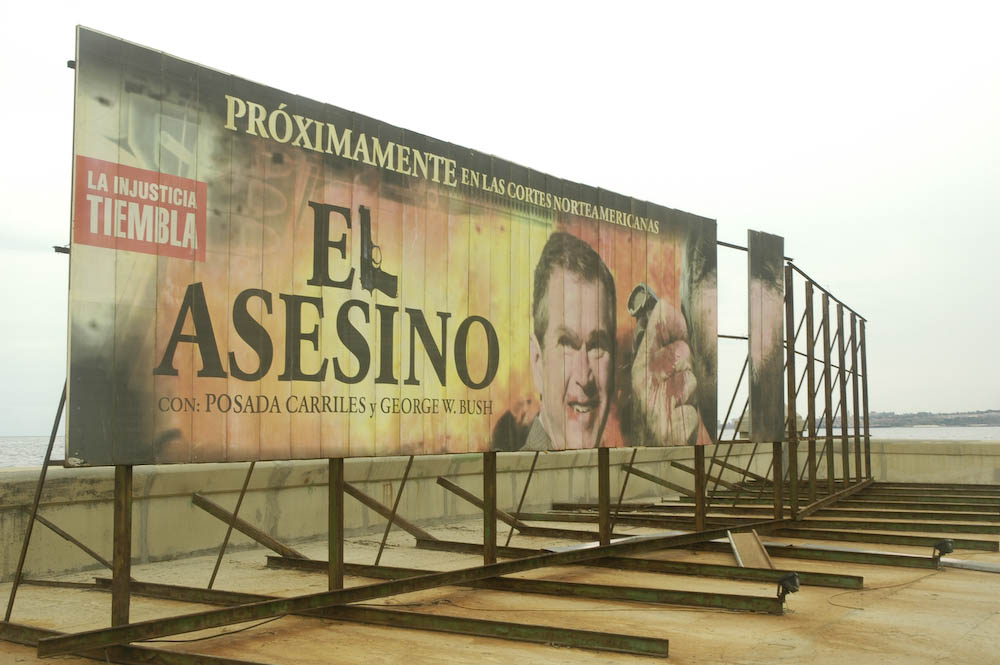
A billboard seen facing the US Interests Section (now US Embassy) in Feb. 2007, showing George W. Bush as "The Murderer"

USINT was a focus for propaganda between Cuba and the US. In the late 1990s, there was a billboard facing USINT with a cartoon revolutionary shouting to Uncle Sam "Señores Imperialistas ¡No les tenemos absolutamente ningún miedo!" – "Mr. imperialists, We have absolutely no fear of you!"

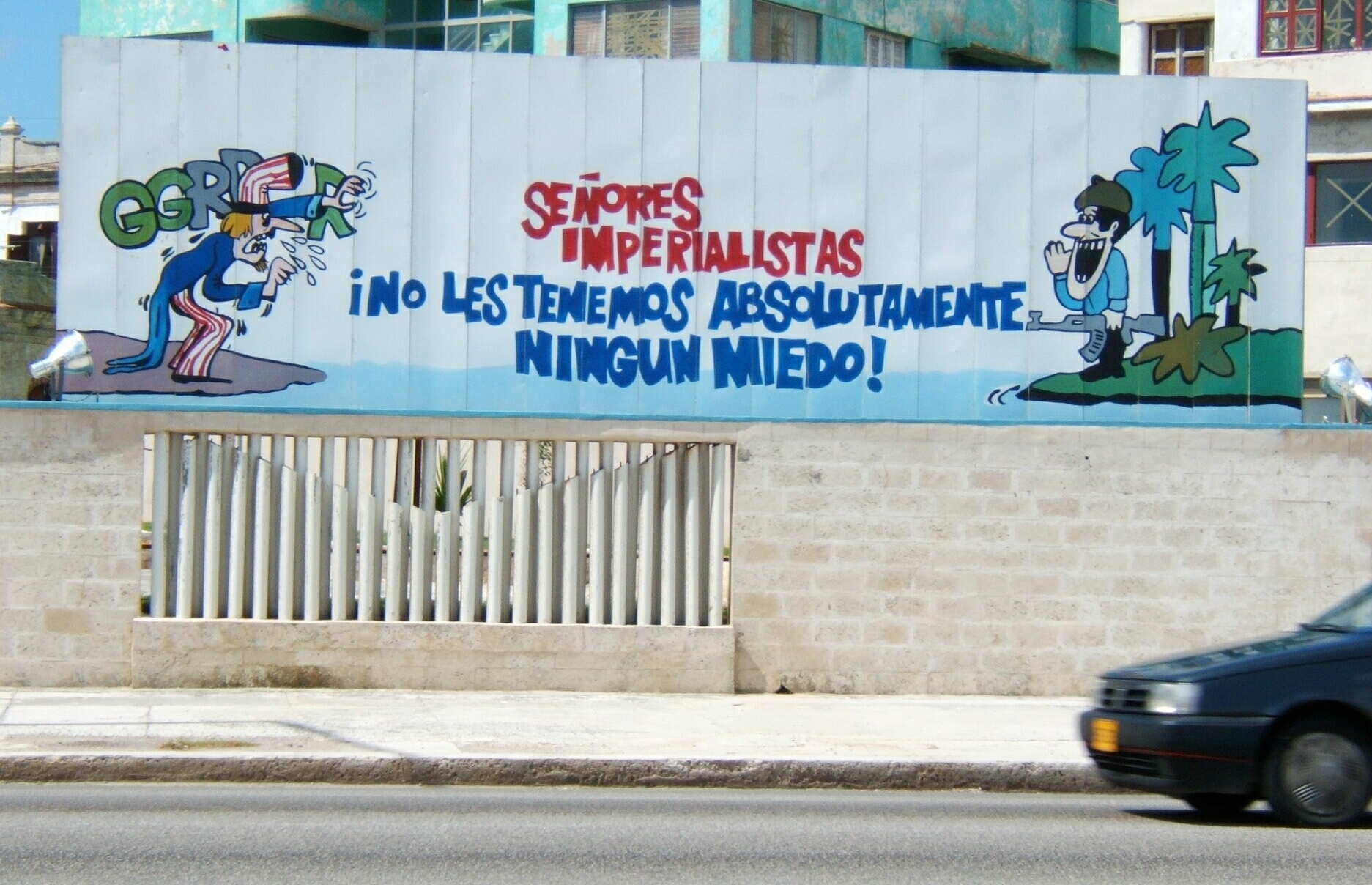
Cuban propaganda poster in Havana featuring a Cuban soldier addressing a threatening Uncle Sam. The translation reads: "Imperialist sirs, we have absolutely no fear of you!"

During the 1999-2000 Elián González case, the area to the east of USINT (previously a grassed area containing the above-mentioned billboard) was paved and a stage was built. It is known as the José Martí Anti-Imperialist Plaza in Cuba. Whilst originally used for rallies and protest meeting (particularly those protesting against actions by the US government), this stage has also been used for concerts, such as Audioslave's concert released on their album Live in Cuba.

=== Support for dissidents ===
The US Interests Section became a focus of anti-government propaganda with the Cuban government when James Cason became head of mission in 2002. Cason stepped up US support for opponents to the Castro government, and regularly met dissidents and anti-Castro journalists.

In March 2003, approximately 75 dissidents were jailed by the Cuban authorities for allegedly receiving unlawful payments from the Interests Section. Some of these were participants in the Varela Project, though the leader of that project, Oswaldo Payá, was careful to stress his distance from the Americans.

The grounds of the USINT Havana featured an annual Christmas display – including a Santa Claus, a Frosty the Snowman, and a sleigh. In 2004, the display also included a large number "75". This was in reference to the jailed dissidents (see above). The Cuban government, in response to Section Chief James Cason's refusal to remove the sign, placed several large billboards facing the building, carrying images of the abuse in Abu Ghraib and references to Nazis.

In January 2006, USINT Havana began displaying messages on a scrolling "electronic billboard" in the windows of their top floor, including the George Burns quotation, "How sad that all the people who would know how to run this country are driving taxis or cutting hair." Following a protest march, the Cuban government erected a large number of poles, carrying black flags with single white stars, obscuring the messages. In June 2006, Granma International referred to the billboard as "the systematic launching of the crudest insults of our people via the electronic billboard, which, in violation of the most elemental regulations of international law, they think they can maintain with impunity on the facade of that imperial lair."

In June 2009, the electronic billboard was turned off, because according to the US State Department, the billboard was not effective in delivering information to the Cuban people.

== Chiefs of USINT Havana ==
- 1977–1979 – Lyle Franklin Lane
- 1979–1982 – Wayne S. Smith
- 1982–1985 – John Ferch
- 1985–1987 – Curtis W. Kamman
- 1987–1990 – John J. Taylor
- 1990–1993 – Alan H. Flanigan
- 1993–1996 – Joseph Sullivan
- 1996–1999 – Michael Kozak
- 1999–2002 – Vicki J. Huddleston
- 2002–2005 – James Cason
- 2005–2008 – Michael E. Parmly
- 2008–2011 – Jonathan D. Farrar
- 2011–2014 – John Caulfield
- 2014–2015 – Jeffrey DeLaurentis

== See also ==
- Cuba–United States relations
- Embassy of the United States, Havana
- José Martí Anti-Imperialist Plaza
- Varela Project
- James Cason
- American diplomatic missions
- Protecting power
