= José Martí Anti-Imperialist Platform =

Event venue in Havana, Cuba

Coordinates: 23.146°N 82.387°W

The José Martí Anti-Imperialist Platform (Spanish Tribuna Antiimperialista José Martí) is a public event venue located in the Plaza de la Dignidad, across the street from the Embassy of the United States in Havana. It was opened in April 2000.

== Overview ==
The plaza lies between the seafront Malecón, Calzada Avenue and N and M streets in Vedado in Havana. The first demonstration there was an anti-American protest over the custody of Elián González, a six-year-old Cuban boy at the time. This event was part of the Cuban efforts to have Elián returned to Cuba and his father, a movement that was ultimately successful in June that year. The site of the protest would be the location for dozens of government-led rallies in years to come. Information about the previous use of the land or the different construction projects on the land is scarce; however, some important details can be seen in an aerial shot. For example, the design shown in the undated picture shows a giant star made into the ground, with the plaza's stage at the center. The red point of the star that points straight to the U.S. Embassy a few hundred feet away is most clear.

As of May 2006, the plaza includes a stage, metal arches over the crowd area, and a monument of 138 flags. The stage and arches have been up since before a May 2005 concert by the American rock band Audioslave, which the band claims was the first outdoor rock and roll concert on Cuban soil by an American band. The capacity of the plaza was 60,000 for that free concert, but the specifics as to the setup for each event are unknown.

Puerto Rican pro-independence reggaeton band Calle 13 performed here in March 2010.

== The "Wall of Flags" ==
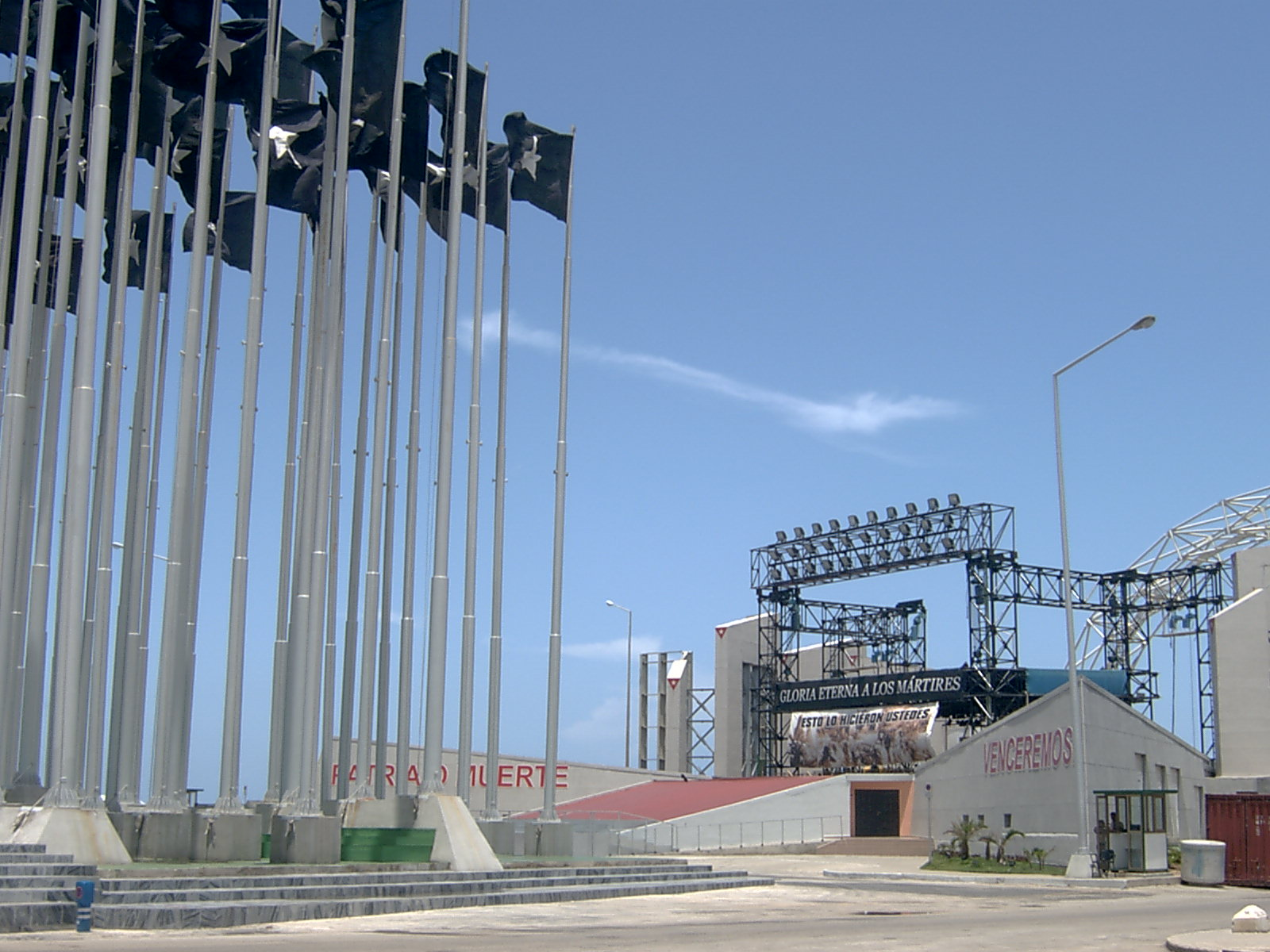
The "Mount of Flags" in "Anti-Imperialism Park" obscuring the US interest section's (now US Embassy) electronic billboard

The flag monument by the plaza first appeared on February 6, 2006 as a response to and an obstruction of the American electronic message ticker on the fifth floor of the U.S. Interests building. The relationship between the monument and the ticker board is not coincidental, as evidenced by the flags' appearance less than a month after the billboard's first use on January 16 for Martin Luther King Jr. Day. These 138 flags, each black with a white star in the center, were raised on 20 meter flagpoles, supposedly to put them high enough to block the ticker's visibility. Most likely, the flags will effectively block the audience in the José Martí Plaza from seeing the American ticker board, as they could during a speech by Fidel Castro in the plaza on January 24, 2006.

The number and design of the flags were to memorialize Cuban victims of terrorism, especially the 73 people who died in the 1976 bombing of a Cuban passenger airliner. When the flags were first hoisted in early February 2006, the alleged mastermind of this attack, Luis Posada Carriles, was under U.S. custody for illegal immigration to the U.S.

== Renovation of 2019 ==
The facilities were damaged by Hurricane Irma in 2017. A renovation of the plaza started in 2019. The five arches were demolished. In place of the many flags that obscured the American embassy, a concrete sculpture was built that is supposed to represent the flag of Cuba. The renovation works were intended to be ready for the celebration of 500 years of Havana. Due to a lack of materials, completion is delayed.

== See also ==
- José Martí
- United States Interests Section in Havana
