= Thomas F. Daughton =

American diplomat (born 1961)

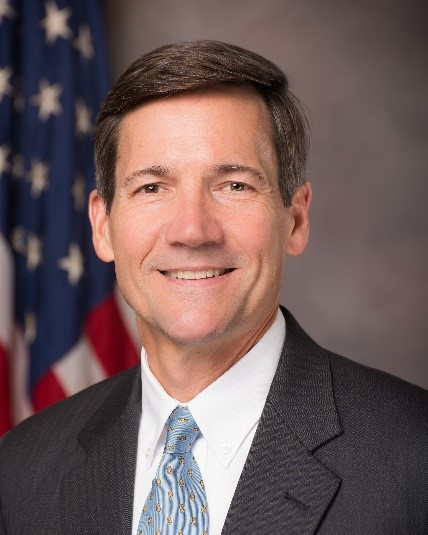
Daughton in 2018

Thomas Frederick Daughton (born March 1961) is an American diplomat and career member of the Senior Foreign Service currently serving as deputy commandant and international affairs advisor at the Dwight D. Eisenhower School for National Security and Resource Strategy at the National Defense University in Washington, D.C. From 2014 through 2017, he was the U.S. ambassador to the Republic of Namibia.

== Early life and education ==
Daughton was born in Phoenix, Arizona. He graduated from Amherst College in 1983 and the University of Virginia School of Law in 1987.

== Career ==
Daughton joined the United States Foreign Service in 1989 after working as an associate at the New York office of the Chicago-based law firm Sidley & Austin. His 30 years as an American diplomat have included overseas assignments at the U.S. embassies in Kingston, Jamaica (1989–1991); Rabat, Morocco (1991–1993); and Kuala Lumpur, Malaysia (2003–2006); and at the U.S. consulate general in Thessaloniki, Greece (1997–2000).

Daughton held the first of his three assignments as a deputy chief of mission at the U.S. Embassy in Libreville, Gabon from 2000 to 2003, where he served as chargé d'affaires, ad interim, (2001–2002) during a yearlong gap between ambassadors. He also served as deputy chief of mission at the U.S. embassies in Algiers, Algeria (2006–2009) and Beirut, Lebanon (2009–2011).

From 2011 to 2013, Daughton was the senior advisor for security negotiations and agreements in the Bureau of Political-Military Affairs at the Department of State in Washington, D.C. For his work in that position negotiating international agreements in support of U.S. military activities in Afghanistan, he received the Secretary's Award for Excellence in International Security Affairs in 2012.

Daughton was nominated by Barack Obama to be U.S. ambassador to the Republic of Namibia on July 31, 2013. Because of a dispute in the Senate over filibusters and confirmations, he became one of ten ambassadorial nominees who waited more than 400 days for confirmation. Daughton was confirmed by the Senate in a voice vote on September 17, 2014. He presented his credentials on November 26, 2014, and he served until December 21, 2017.
