= Wayne Smith (diplomat) =

American diplomat (1932–2024)

Wayne Sanford Smith (August 16, 1932 – June 28, 2024) was an American diplomat, academic, and author. He published four books on the topic of Cuba and U.S.-Cuba relations.

== Government service ==
Smith was born in Seguin, Texas in 1932. In 1949, Smith joined the United States Marine Corps, and served until 1953, including combat in the 1950-1953 Korean War. In 1957, he joined the U.S. State Department, serving in posts in Brazil, the Soviet Union, Argentina, and Cuba. From 1979 to 1982, he was the second Chief of Mission of the U.S. Interests Section in Havana under President Jimmy Carter and President Ronald Reagan. Smith retired after 25 years in the Foreign Service due to personal disagreement with the policies of Reagan in Latin America. In particular, he disagreed with the Reagan policies in Central America at the time (Iran Contra, military advisers in El Salvador and Nicaragua) and Cuba. He forcefully rejected the idea that diplomacy should take a back seat to the use of force and vehemently disagreed with the U.S. embargo on Cuba, believing it to be counter productive to the establishment of meaningful dialogue and rapprochement between the two countries.

At the time of his retirement in 1982, he became a fellow at the Carnegie Endowment for International Peace (1982-1984) and an adjunct professor at Johns Hopkins School of Advanced International Studies in Washington, D.C., where he established a Cuba program and taught until 1998. Smith consistently urged members of the U.S. Congress to end the embargo during those years. After the 1992 Helms-Burton legislation, signed into law by then-President Bill Clinton, Smith took it upon himself to launch targeted diplomatic missions headlining various politicians and groups of interest to Cuba to facilitate dialogue. He was the first intermediary to take Senator Patrick Leahy, among others, and various Congressional fact finding missions to Cuba. He also established a doctor interchange between the medical faculty at Johns Hopkins School of Medicine and medical doctors in Cuba to exchange ideas and research ideas and protocols. Smith also introduced a number of U.S. Associations to interested parties in Cuba, Rice Growers Association, Sugar Growers Association, among others. He facilitated the free exchange of information and the establishment of a mutually inclusive flow of information between the U.S. National Oceanic and Atmospheric Administration and Cuba's oceanographic and weather scientists to work jointly on hurricane science and warning systems, in addition to fisheries and information pertaining to the Jet Stream flowing between the two countries.

Smith was a key figure in establishing a legal and steady flow of air charter flights from Miami beginning in 1982 and expanding to encompass numerous airlines chartering Cubans living in Miami to Havana.

Smith worked with the Center for International Policy from 1995 to 2014. He was one of many senior critics of the U.S. embargo against Cuba, and he was involved with the Center for International Policy.

Smith died of complications from Alzheimer's disease in New Orleans, Louisiana, on June 30, 2024, at the age of 92.
