= Robert T. Yamate =

American diplomat

Robert Yamate
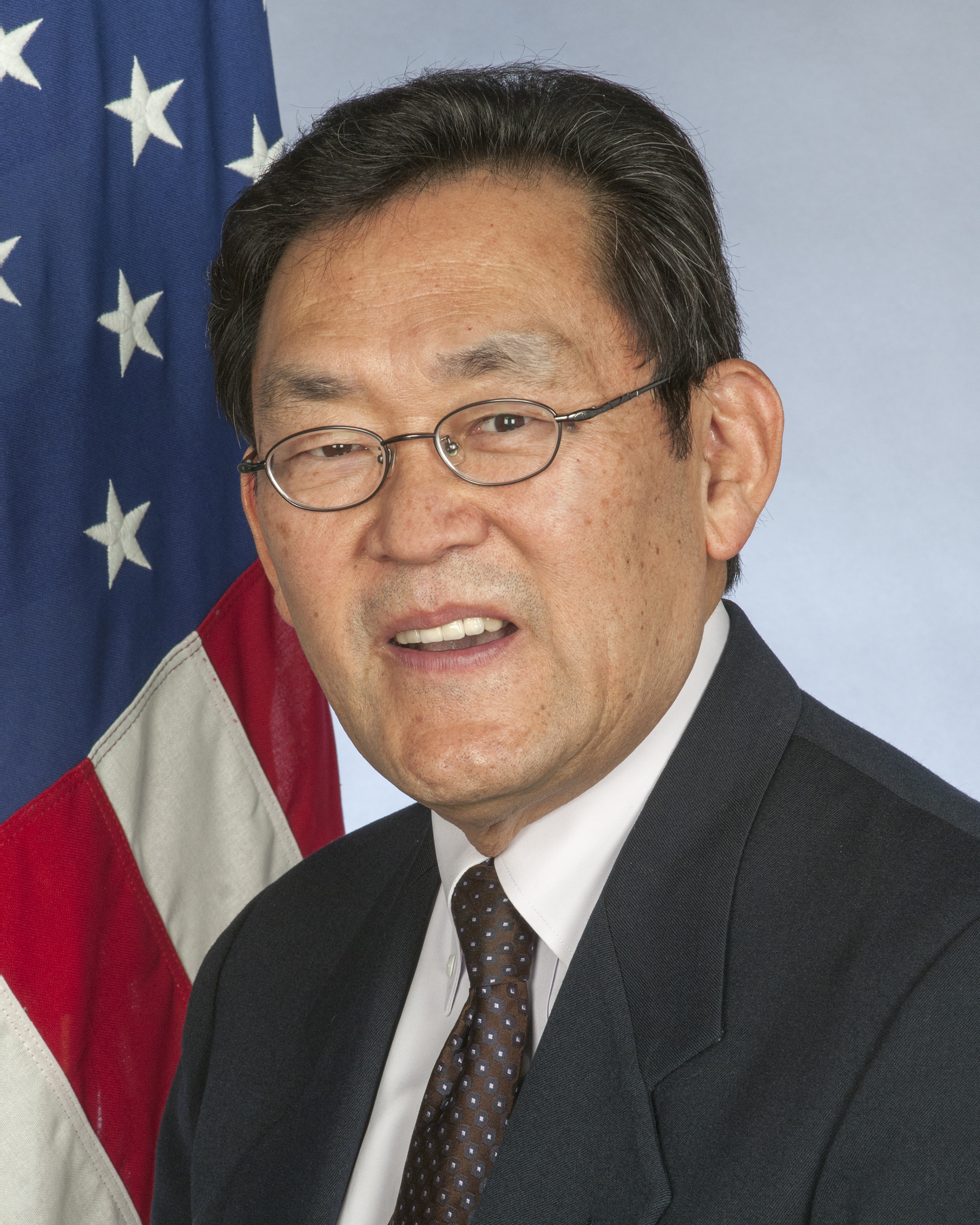

United States Ambassador to Madagascar and Comoros
- In office December 19, 2014 – April 1, 2018
- President: Barack Obama; Donald Trump
- Deputy: Stephen C. Anderson
- Preceded by: R. Niels Marquardt
- Succeeded by: Michael Pelletier

Personal details
- Born: 1950 (age 75–76) Monterey Park, California; United States
- Spouse: Michiko Yamate
- Education: California State Polytechnic University, Pomona; University of La Verne; University of Pittsburgh
- Awards: Superior Honor Award; Meritorious Honor Award

Robert T. Yamate (born 1950 in Monterey Park, California) is an American diplomat of Japanese descent and a career member of the Senior Foreign Service. He previously served as the United States Ambassador to Madagascar and Comoros.

== Early life and education ==
Yamate is from Monterey Park, California. Yamate earned a Bachelor of Science in mathematics at California State Polytechnic University, Pomona in 1973, a Master of Arts in education from the University of La Verne in 1977, and a Master of Business Administration from the University of Pittsburgh in 1983. In addition to English, Yamate speaks French, Japanese, and Hungarian.

== Career ==
Yamate's early Foreign Service assignments included Tokyo, Japan; Budapest, Hungary; and the State Department Operations Center in Washington, D.C.

From 1989 to 1991, Yamate served as the administrative officer at the U.S. embassy in Antananarivo, Madagascar. Following that, he became a management officer at the U.S. consulate in Montreal, Quebec, Canada. In 1994, Yamate was assigned as charge d’affaires at the U.S. embassy in Apia, Samoa.

Yamate returned to Washington, D.C. in 1997 as deputy executive director in the Office of Personnel. He then went on to Taipei as the administrative officer at the American Institute in Taiwan. He returned to Africa in 2002 as a management counselor at the U.S. embassy in Harare, Zimbabwe, and later as minister counselor for management at the U.S. embassy in Abidjan, Cote d'Ivoire.

Yamate was then appointed as minister counselor for management at the United States Mission to the United Nations in Geneva, Switzerland. Yamate returned to Washington, D.C. in 2008 for an assignment in the Bureau of Intelligence and Research. In 2010, Yamate became the deputy chief of mission in Dakar, Senegal, acting as charge d’affaires for a time in 2012. In 2013, he became an assessor on the State Department's Board of Examiners.

Yamate was nominated to be United States Ambassador to Madagascar and Comoros on July 31, 2014. Yamate testified to the Senate Foreign Relations Committee on September 11, 2014, and was confirmed by the United States Senate on November 19, 2014. He presented his credentials in Madagascar on January 14, 2015, and in Comoros on February 3, 2015.

== Awards ==
Yamate is the recipient of two Senior Foreign Service Performance Awards, four Superior Honor Awards, and five Meritorious Honor Awards from the Department of State.

== Personal life ==
Robert Yamate is married to Michiko Yamate.

Diplomatic posts
Preceded by R. Niels Marquardt	U.S. Ambassador to Madagascar and Comoros; 2014–2018	Succeeded by Michael Pelletier
