= Protecting power =

Country that represents a second country to a third country

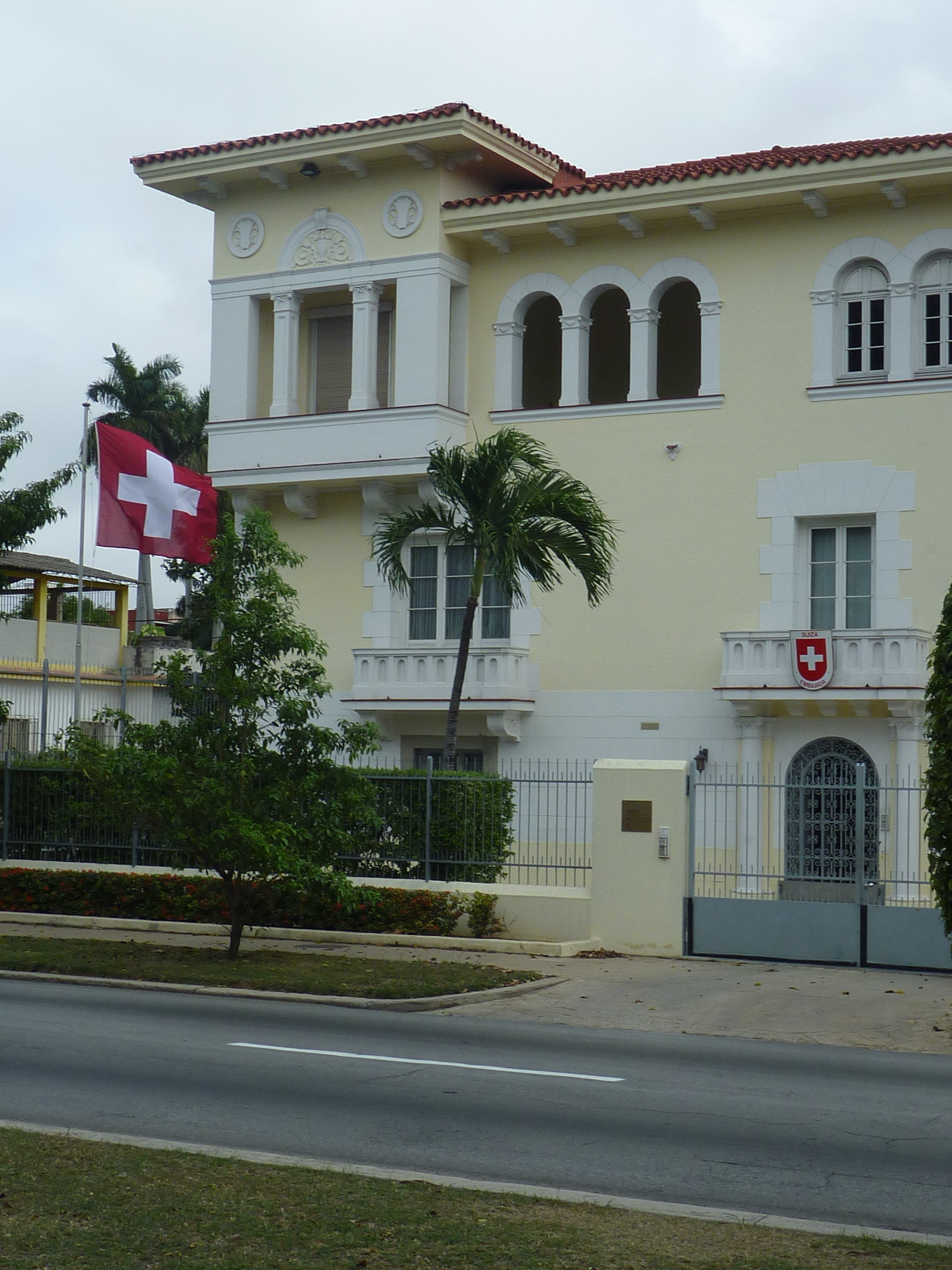
Between 1961 and 2015, Switzerland was the protecting power of the United States in Cuba. The United States Interests Section in Havana, although it was staffed by personnel of the United States Foreign Service, was formally a section of the Embassy of Switzerland.

A protecting power is a country that represents another sovereign state—the protected power—in a third country where the protected power lacks its own formal diplomatic representation (e.g., lacks an embassy or consulate). It is common for protecting powers to be appointed when two countries break off diplomatic relations with each other. The protecting power is responsible for looking after the protected power's diplomatic property and citizens in the hosting state. If diplomatic relations were broken by the outbreak of war, the protecting power also inquires into the welfare of prisoners of war and looks after the interests of civilians in enemy-occupied territory.

The institution of protecting power dates back to the Franco-Prussian War of 1870 and was formalized in the Geneva Convention of 1929. Protecting powers are authorized in all four of the Geneva Conventions of 1949. In addition to sovereign states being appointed as protecting powers, the International Committee of the Red Cross may be appointed a protecting power under Protocol I (1977). The practice of selecting a protecting power in time of peace was formalized in the Vienna Convention on Diplomatic Relations (1961).

== Diplomacy ==
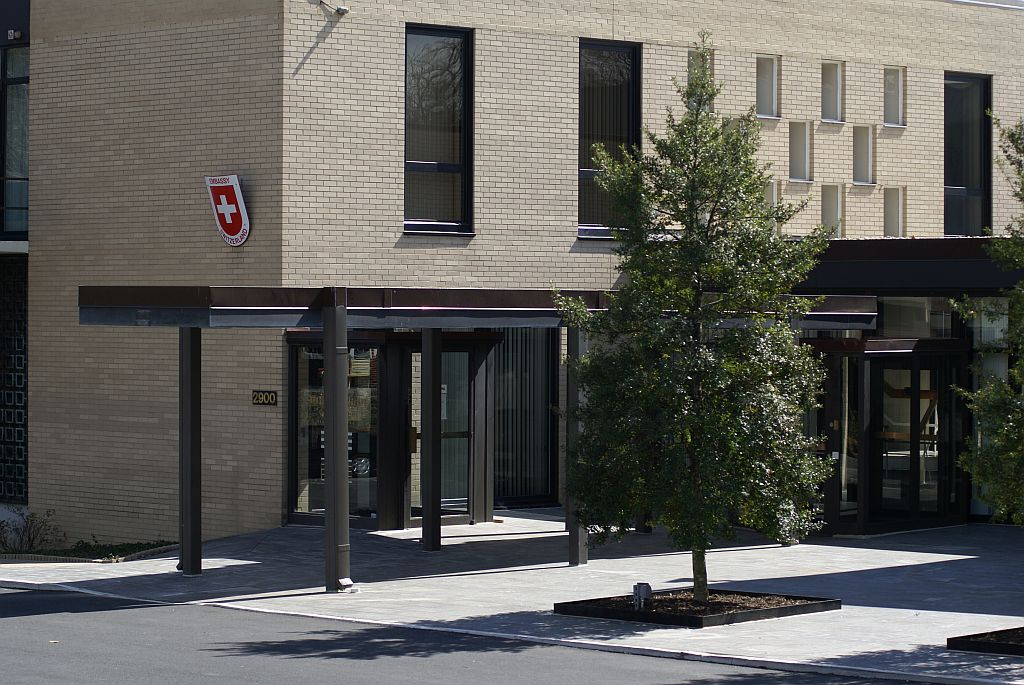
Between 1991 and 2015, the Swiss Embassy in Washington, D.C., also officially represented Cuba's interests in the United States.

President Obama thanks the Swiss government for assistance in Iran (2016)

The protecting power is appointed by the protected power and must also be acceptable to the host state. It must therefore maintain diplomatic relations with both states. In time of war, the Geneva Conventions also require the protecting power to be a neutral country. The specific responsibilities and arrangements are agreed between the protecting power, the protected power, and the host country.

In a comprehensive mandate, the protecting power carries out most diplomatic functions on behalf of the protected power. This is necessary when relations are so hostile that the sparring nations have no diplomatic or consular staff posted on each other's territory. For example, Sweden carries out limited consular functions for the United States, Canada, and Australia in North Korea, thus serving as the protecting power for the three protected powers.

In other cases, the two nations have broken diplomatic relations, but are nevertheless willing to exchange diplomatic personnel on an informal basis. The protecting power serves as the mechanism for facilitating this exchange of informal diplomats. The former embassy of the protected power is staffed by its own diplomatic personnel, but it is formally termed an "interests section" of the protecting power's embassy. For example, between 1991 and 2015, the Cuban Interests Section was staffed by Cubans and occupied the old Cuban embassy in Washington, D.C., but it was formally a section of the Swiss Embassy to the United States. When relations are exceptionally tense, however, such as during a war, the "interests section" is instead staffed by diplomats from the protecting power. For example, when Iraq and the U.S. broke diplomatic relations due to the Gulf War, Poland became the protecting power for the United States. The United States Interests Section of the Polish Embassy in Iraq was headed by a Polish diplomat.

There is no requirement that the same protecting power be selected by both countries, although this is convenient for the purposes of communication. Each may appoint a different protecting power, provided that the choice is acceptable to the other state. There is also no requirement that a country select only one protecting power in the host country. For instance, in the Second World War, Japan appointed Spain, Sweden and Switzerland to be its protecting powers in the United States.

== History ==
=== Origins ===
Although protecting powers have existed in diplomatic usage since the 16th century, the modern institution of protecting power originated in the Franco-Prussian War of 1870–1871. All of the belligerents appointed protecting powers, necessitated by the expulsion of diplomats and placing of restrictions on enemy aliens. The United States acted as protecting power for the North German Confederation and several of the smaller German states, while Switzerland was the protecting power for Baden and Bavaria, and Russia for Württemberg. Meanwhile, the United Kingdom served as the protecting power for France.

The energetic efforts of Elihu B. Washburne, the United States Minister to France, set a precedent for the actions of protecting powers in war. The American flag was raised over the North German Embassy, and the embassy archives were transferred to the U.S. legation for safekeeping. Washburne arranged for the evacuation of 30,000 North German subjects from France in the opening days of the war. As the only chief of mission from a major power to remain in the French capital during the Siege of Paris, he was also charged with the protection of seven Latin American consulates and was responsible for feeding 3,000 German civilians who were stuck in the city.

=== Early developments ===
After the Franco-Prussian War, the appointment of protecting powers became customary international law. In subsequent wars, the protecting powers expanded their duties with the consent of the belligerents. In the First Sino-Japanese War, both sides selected the United States as their protecting power, establishing the concept of a reciprocal mandate. During the Spanish–American War, the United States requested neutral inspection of prisoner of war camps for the first time.

Since the institution of protecting power had not been formalized by treaty, disputes arose over the protecting power's rights and responsibilities. In the Second Boer War, the British Empire selected the United States to be its protecting power, but the Boers refused to allow the U.S. to transmit funds from the British government to prisoners of war. The Netherlands, acting as the protecting power for the Boer Republics, was also unable to secure an agreement to exchange the names of prisoners of war. Two years later during the Russo-Japanese War, the belligerents agreed to exchange lists of prisoners, communicating through France as the protecting power for Russia, and the United States as the protecting power for Japan. The practice of swapping prisoner lists became customary and was eventually included in the Geneva Convention of 1929.

=== World Wars ===
==== World War I ====
The United States was initially a popular choice for protecting power, going back to its protection of the North German Confederation during the Franco-Prussian War. The pinnacle of American diplomatic protection came during World War I, when the United States accepted reciprocal mandates from five of the largest belligerents on both sides: Britain, France, Austria-Hungary, Germany, and the Ottoman Empire. Between 1914 and 1917, the United States accepted a total of 54 mandates as protecting power. When the United States entered the war on the Allied side in 1917, the American mandates were transferred to smaller neutrals, with the Netherlands, Spain, and Switzerland being popular choices.

In the interwar period, the role of a protecting power was finally formalized in the Geneva Convention of 1929. Protecting powers were allowed to inspect prisoner of war camps, interview prisoners in private, communicate freely with prisoners, and supply books for the prison library. However, a suggestion by the International Committee of the Red Cross that it be made responsible for ensuring compliance with the treaty was rejected.

==== World War II ====
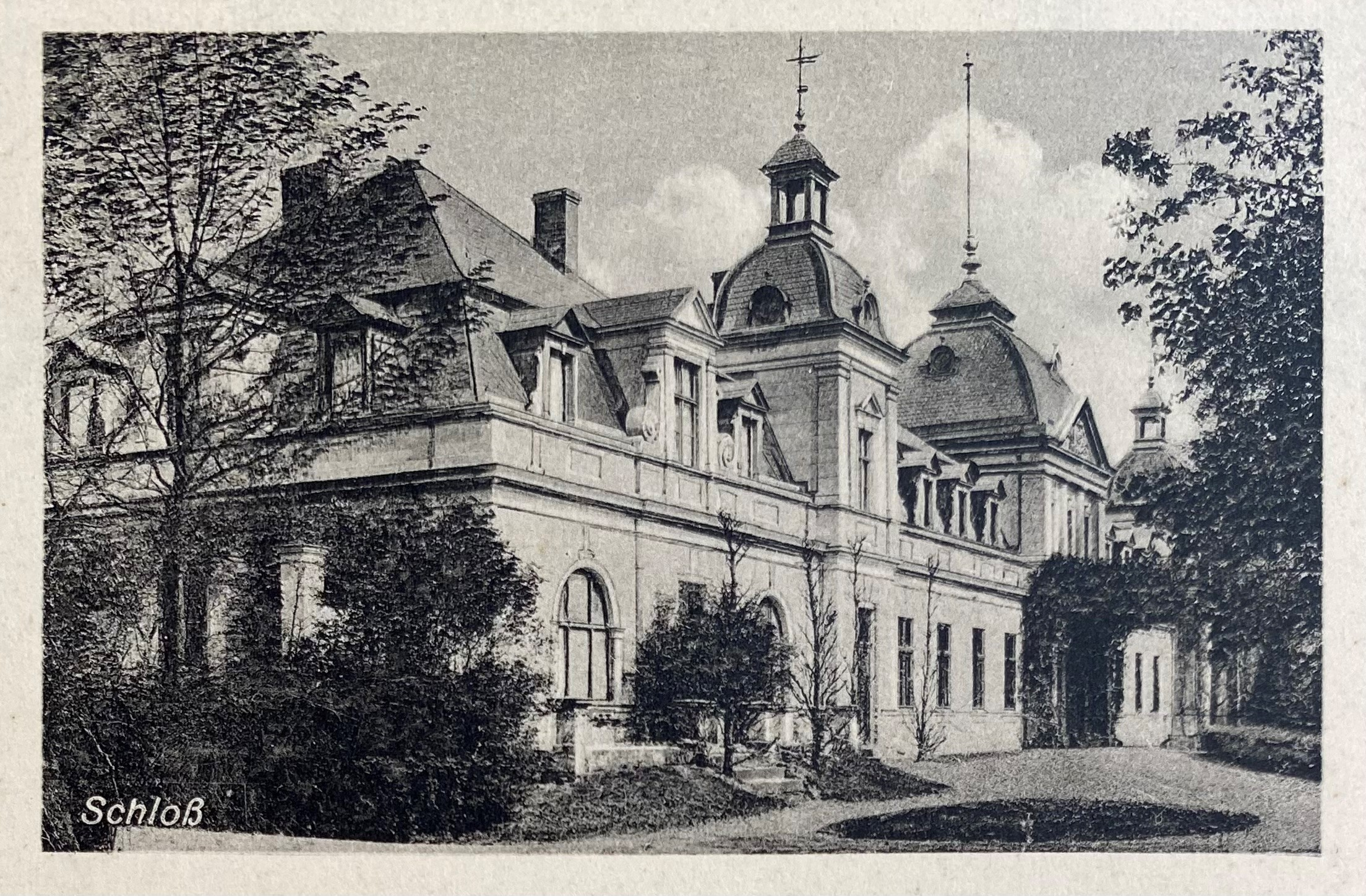
Schloss Großwudicke in Milower Land in the 1930s. From 1943 until the relocation to Schloss Höhenried in March 1945, it served as a temporary accommodation for the Swiss Legation in Germany during the war. During the period of the heaviest bombing of Berlin, it was the seat of Minister Peter Anton Feldscher (1889–1979), head of the Department for Protecting Power Mandates. The castle was demolished in 1973.

The United States remained a popular choice at the start of World War II, accepting 75 mandates on behalf of Allied countries between 1939 and 1941. However, the United States was no longer seen as a disinterested neutral, and none of the Axis countries asked the United States to be its protecting power. The greater scope of the war also disqualified two of the most popular protecting powers of the First World War: Francoist Spain remained neutral but was Axis-leaning, and the Netherlands were occupied by Germany. As a result, Switzerland and Sweden became the most popular choices for protecting power. Switzerland formally undertook 219 mandates for 35 states, and represented another eight states unofficially, while Sweden accepted 114 mandates for 28 states. When the US entered the war in late 1941, Switzerland took over its mandates. In terms of major roles Swiss diplomats had the mandate to protect Germany's interest in Britain, the United States, Yugoslavia, Turkey, and Dutch Indonesia. Switzerland protected British interests in Germany, France, Italy, Hungary, Romania and Japan. It protected Vichy France's interests in Britain, the United States, Italy, Egypt and Brazil. It protected Italy's interest in Egypt and Brazil. It protected the United States interest in Germany, France, Italy, Japan, China and Denmark. It protected Japan's interest in Britain, the United States, Egypt and Argentina. The diplomats arranged travel permissions, helping tens of thousands of people to return to their home countries after being trapped in an enemy nation. Swiss diplomats also supervised closed enemy embassies. Of special importance was the protection provided to prisoners of war, especially the sick and wounded.

=== Geneva Conventions of 1949 ===
The Geneva Conventions of 1949 addressed the abuses that had taken place during World War II. The appointment of a protecting power had been optional in the 1929 Convention, but the 1949 Convention made it obligatory. All four of the Conventions refer to protecting powers, and the Fourth Geneva Convention formalized the role of protecting powers toward civilians. The detaining power was also required to appoint a substitute whenever the benefit of a protecting power was lost. Seventy percent of prisoners of war had lost their protecting power in World War II because their governments were disputed or had ceased to exist. Anticipating a war in which every country was a belligerent, the Conventions provide the option of appointing an international organization as protecting power.

=== Cold War ===
The superpower rivalry of the Cold War led to changes in the institution of protecting power. The United States, which had accepted over 200 mandates as protecting power before 1945, was no longer seen as a disinterested third party and managed to secure only one mandate after 1945. Instead, the United States had to appoint a protecting power to represent its interests over a dozen times since 1945. Switzerland and Sweden both chose to remain non-aligned in the Cold War and refused to join any military alliances, leading to their continued popularity as protecting powers. Since 1945, Switzerland has held as many as 24 simultaneous mandates as protecting power.

The interests section was born in the aftermath of Rhodesia's Unilateral Declaration of Independence in 1965, when nine African countries broke off diplomatic relations with the United Kingdom. The protecting power for the United Kingdom declared that said British diplomats were members of the protecting power's own embassy—that is, it was as if the British diplomats were of the protecting power’s own country. As a result, the British diplomats retained their diplomatic immunity and could stay in the (former) British embassy, which had been placed into the charge of the protecting power. The innovation was widely adopted after the Six-Day War of 1967. The Arab states allowed American diplomats to remain in their capitals as the U.S. Interests Section of the respective protecting power, while Israel allowed Soviet diplomats to remain in Tel Aviv as the Soviet Interests Section of the Finnish Embassy.

The fiercest proxy wars of the Cold War were civil wars, including the Korean War, the Algerian War and the Vietnam War. Because the principal belligerents each claimed to be the country's sole legitimate government, they did not recognize each other and refused to maintain diplomatic relations with any countries that recognized the other side. This difficulty was resolved by Protocol I (1977) to the Geneva Conventions, which stipulated that the belligerents should nominate protecting powers to the International Committee of the Red Cross. The Red Cross would then approach any countries that appeared on both lists, without the belligerents having to communicate with each other directly. If no arrangement could be made with a third country, then the belligerents had to accept the Red Cross or another international organization to act as the protecting power.

== Current mandates ==
| Protecting power | Protected power | Host state | Mandate | Notes |
|---|---|---|---|---|
| Brazil | Peru | Venezuela | Comprehensive | |
| Brazil | Mexico | Peru | Comprehensive | |
| Canada | Israel | Cuba | | |
| Czech Republic | United States | Syria | Interest Section | |
| Italy | Argentina | Venezuela | Comprehensive | |
| Italy | Canada | Iran | | |
| Oman | Iran | Canada | | |
| Pakistan | Iran | United States | Interests section | See also: Iranian Interests Section |
| Qatar | United States | Afghanistan | Interests section | |
| Sweden | Australia | North Korea | Comprehensive | |
| Sweden | Canada | North Korea | Comprehensive | |
| Sweden | Denmark | North Korea | Comprehensive | |
| Sweden | Finland | North Korea | Comprehensive | |
| Sweden | France | North Korea | Comprehensive | |
| Sweden | Iceland | North Korea | Comprehensive | |
| Sweden | Italy | North Korea | Schengen visa applications | |
| Sweden | Norway | North Korea | Comprehensive | |
| Sweden | Spain | North Korea | Schengen visa applications | |
| Sweden | United States | North Korea | Comprehensive | |
| Switzerland | Georgia | Russia | Interests section | |
| Switzerland | Iran | Canada | Interests section | |
| Switzerland | Iran | Egypt | Interests section | |
| Switzerland | Mexico | Ecuador | Comprehensive | |
| Switzerland | Ecuador | Mexico | Comprehensive | |
| Switzerland | Ecuador | Venezuela | Interests section | |
| Switzerland | Russia | Georgia | Interests section | |
| Switzerland | United States | Iran | Interests section | |

== Other meanings ==
- The term "protection" is also used when a state exercises control over another state's foreign policy (including defence), in which case the latter is called a protected state or a protectorate.
- The term "friendly protection" also applied to "guarantor" state(s) vowing to prevent the protected state (or a specific part) from being overrun by a third party.

=== Consular services ===
Certain countries may have agreements to provide limited consular services to the citizens of other countries. This does not necessarily constitute a protecting power relationship, as the host country may not have formally agreed, and there may in fact be diplomatic relations between the host country and the third country, but no physical representation. Under Article 8 of the Vienna Convention on Consular Relations, a consular post may exercise consular functions on behalf of a third State only upon notification to the host country and absent its objection; without the host country's agreement, consular officials in this role are not recognized as representing the interests of another state. role.

- Pursuant to the Compacts of Free Association, The United States provides consular services to citizens of the Federated States of Micronesia, the Republic of the Marshall Islands and the Republic of Palau, formerly part of a US Trust Territory of the Pacific Islands.
- Certain Commonwealth countries, including Australia, New Zealand, Canada, and the United Kingdom, have agreements in certain countries to provide consular services for citizens of the other countries where they do not have physical representation. The United Kingdom provides consular assistance to Canadians abroad where there is no Canadian mission, as stated in each Canadian passport. Under the Canada–Australia Consular Services Sharing Agreement Canada provides consular assistance to Australian citizens to several states in Latin America and Africa, which Australian diplomatic missions reciprocate in several Asia-Pacific states.
- Under Article 20 section 2c of the Treaty on the functioning of the European Union citizens of European Union countries may request consular services at the missions of other EU countries when their home country does not have a mission locally.
- In 2006, the governments of Montenegro and Serbia adopted the Memorandum of Agreement between the Republic of Montenegro and the Republic of Serbia on Consular Protection and Services to the Citizens of Montenegro. By this agreement, Serbia, through its network of diplomatic and consular missions, provides consular services to the Montenegrin citizens on the territory of states in which Montenegro has no missions of its own.
