= Latin American art =

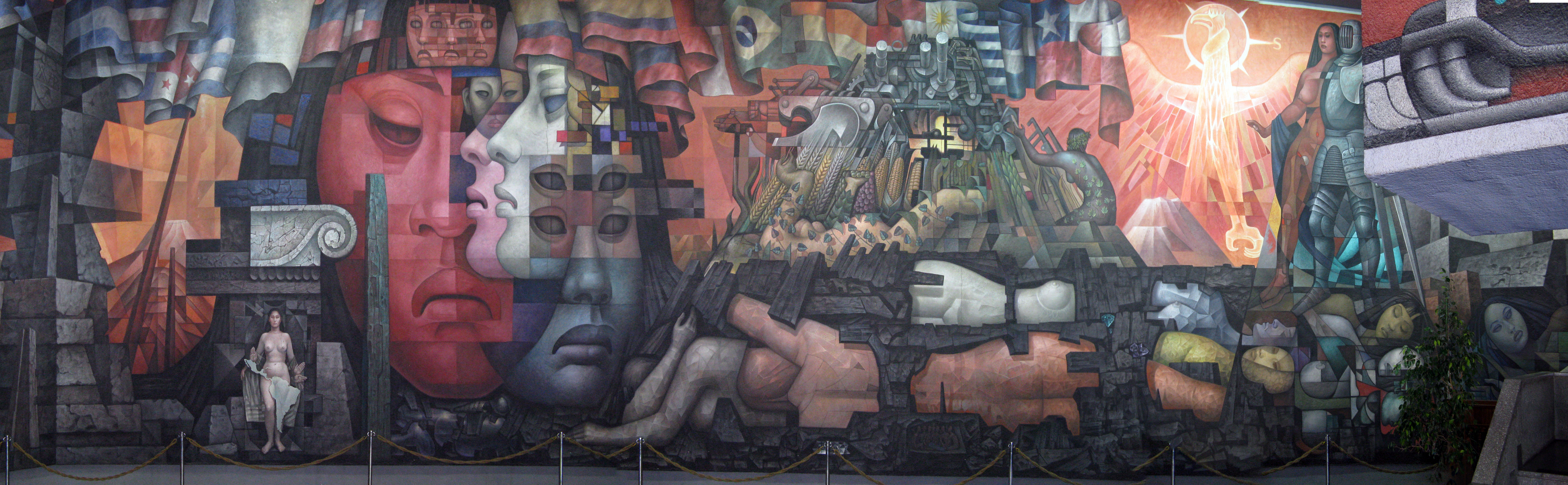
Presencia de América Latina (1964-65), mural by Jorge González Camarena.

Latin American art is the combined artistic expression of Mexico, Central America, Caribbean, and South America, as well as Latin Americans living in other regions.

The art has roots in the many different indigenous cultures that inhabited the Americas before European colonization in the 16th century. The indigenous cultures each developed sophisticated artistic disciplines, which were highly influenced by religious and spiritual concerns. Their work is collectively known and referred to as Pre-Columbian art. The blending of Amerindian, European and African cultures has resulted in a unique Mestizo tradition.

== Colonial period ==
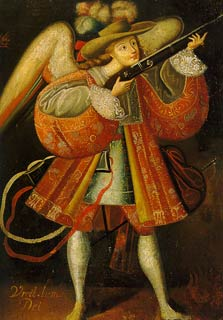
Archangel Uranus, anonymous, Cuzco School 18th century

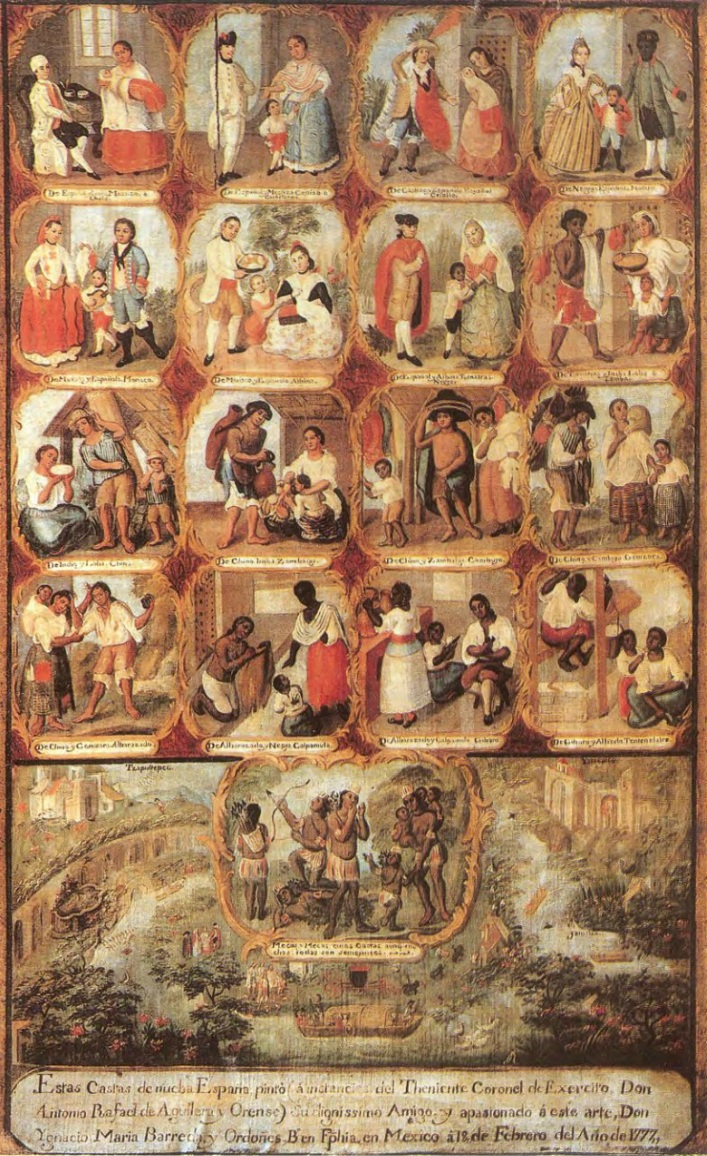
Single canvas depiction of the casta system of racial hierarchy in eighteenth-century Mexico, by Ignacio María Barreda. Most sets of casta paintings were individual canvases showing only one family.

During the colonial period, a mixture of indigenous traditions and European influences (mainly due to the Christian teachings of Franciscan, Augustinian and Dominican friars) produced a very particular Christian art known as Indochristian art. In addition to indigenous art, the development of Latin American visual art was significantly influenced by Spanish, Portuguese, and French and Dutch Baroque painting. In turn Baroque painting was often influenced by the Italian masters.

The Cuzco School is viewed as the first center of European-style painting in the Americas. In the 17th and 18th centuries, Spanish art instructors taught Quechua artists to paint religious imagery based on classical and Renaissance styles.

In eighteenth-century New Spain, Mexican artists along with a few Spanish artists produced paintings of a system of racial hierarchy, known as casta paintings. It was almost exclusively a Mexican form however, one set was produced in Peru. In a break from religious paintings of the preceding centuries, casta paintings were a secular art form. Only one known casta painting by a relatively unknown painter, Luis de Mena, combines castas with Mexico's Virgin of Guadalupe; this being an exception. Some of Mexico's most distinguished artists painted casta works, including Miguel Cabrera. Most casta paintings were on multiple canvases, with one family grouping on each. There were a handful of single canvas paintings, showing the entire racial hierarchy. The paintings show idealized family groupings, with the father being of one racial, the mother of another racial category, and their offspring being a third racial category. This genre of painting flourished for about a century, coming to an end with Mexican independence in 1821, and the abolition of legal racial categories.

In the seventeenth century, The Netherlands had captured the rich sugar-producing area of the Portuguese colony of Brazil (1630–1654). During that period, Dutch artist Albert Eckhout painted a number of important depictions of social types in Brazil. These depictions included images of indigenous men and women, as well as still lifes.

Scientific expeditions approved by the Spanish crown began exploring Spanish America where its flora and fauna were recorded. Spaniard José Celestino Mutis, a medical doctor and horticulturalist and follower of Swedish scientist Carl Linnaeus, led an expedition starting in 1784 to northern South America, the expedition is known as the Expedición Botánica de Nueva Granada. Local artists were Ecuadorean Indians, who produced five thousand color drawings of nature, all being published. The crown chartered expedition whose purpose was scientific recording of the natural beauty and wealth of Nature, was a departure from the long traditional religious art.

The most important scientific expedition was that of Alexander von Humboldt and French botanist Aimé Bonpland. They traveled for five years throughout Spanish America (1799-1804), exploring and recording scientific information as well as the attire and lifestyles local populations. Humboldt's work became an inspiration and template for continuing scientific work in the nineteenth century, as well as traveller reporters who recorded the scenes of everyday life.

In 1818, the Academy of San Alejandro in Havana, Cuba, was founded by Alejandro Ramírez, and the French painter Jean Baptiste Vermay, served as the founding director. It is the oldest academy of art in Latin America.

=== Historiography of colonial art and architecture ===
The history of Latin American art has generally been written by those with training in art history departments. However, the concept of "visual culture" has now brought scholars trained in other disciplines to write the histories of art. It became more prevalent through the later 1900's. As with the history of indigenous peoples, for many years there was a focus on either the pre-Columbian period (Olmec, Maya, Aztec, Inca) art production, then a leap to the twentieth century. More recently, the colonial era and the nineteenth century have developed as fields of focus. Visual culture as a field increasingly crosses disciplinary boundaries. Colonial architecture has been the subject of a number of important studies.

Colonial art has a long tradition, especially in Mexico, with there being publications of Manuel Toussaint. In recent years, there has been a boom in publications on colonial art, with some useful overviews being published in recent years. Many works deal exclusively with Spanish America.

Major exhibitions on colonial art have resulted in fine catalogs as a permanent record.

=== Gallery ===
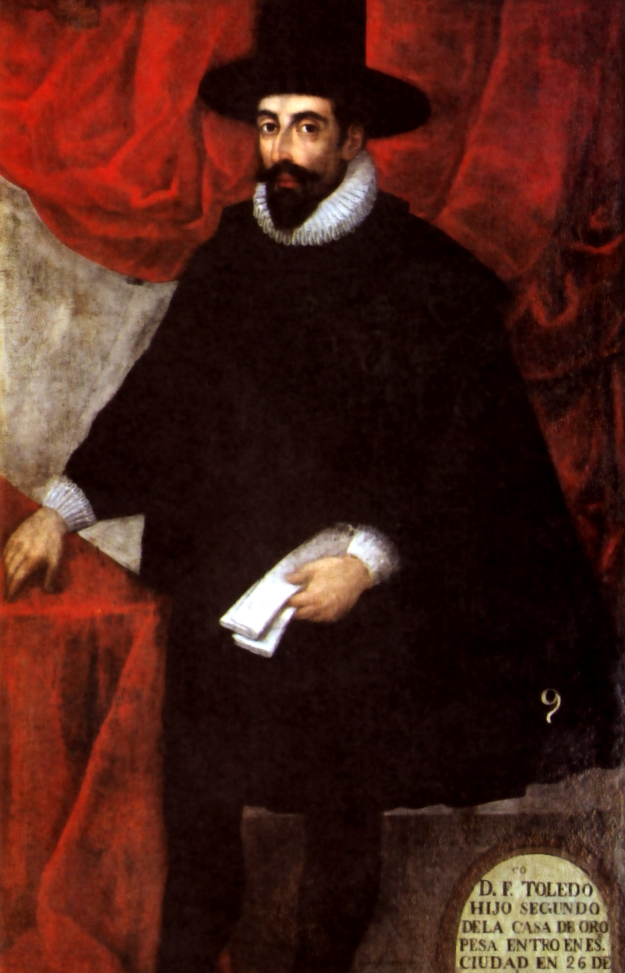
Official portrait of Viceroy Francisco de Toledo

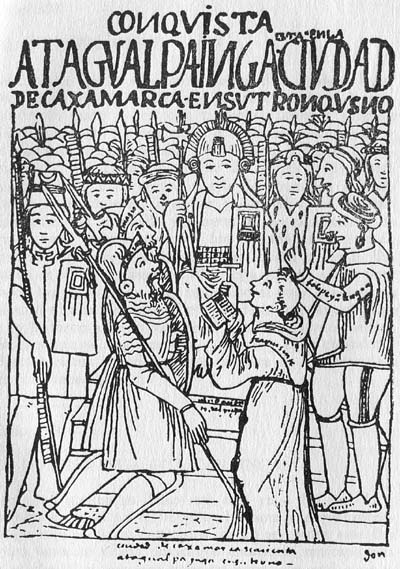
Guaman Poma de Ayala illustration of the meeting of Atahualpa and Francisco Pizarro

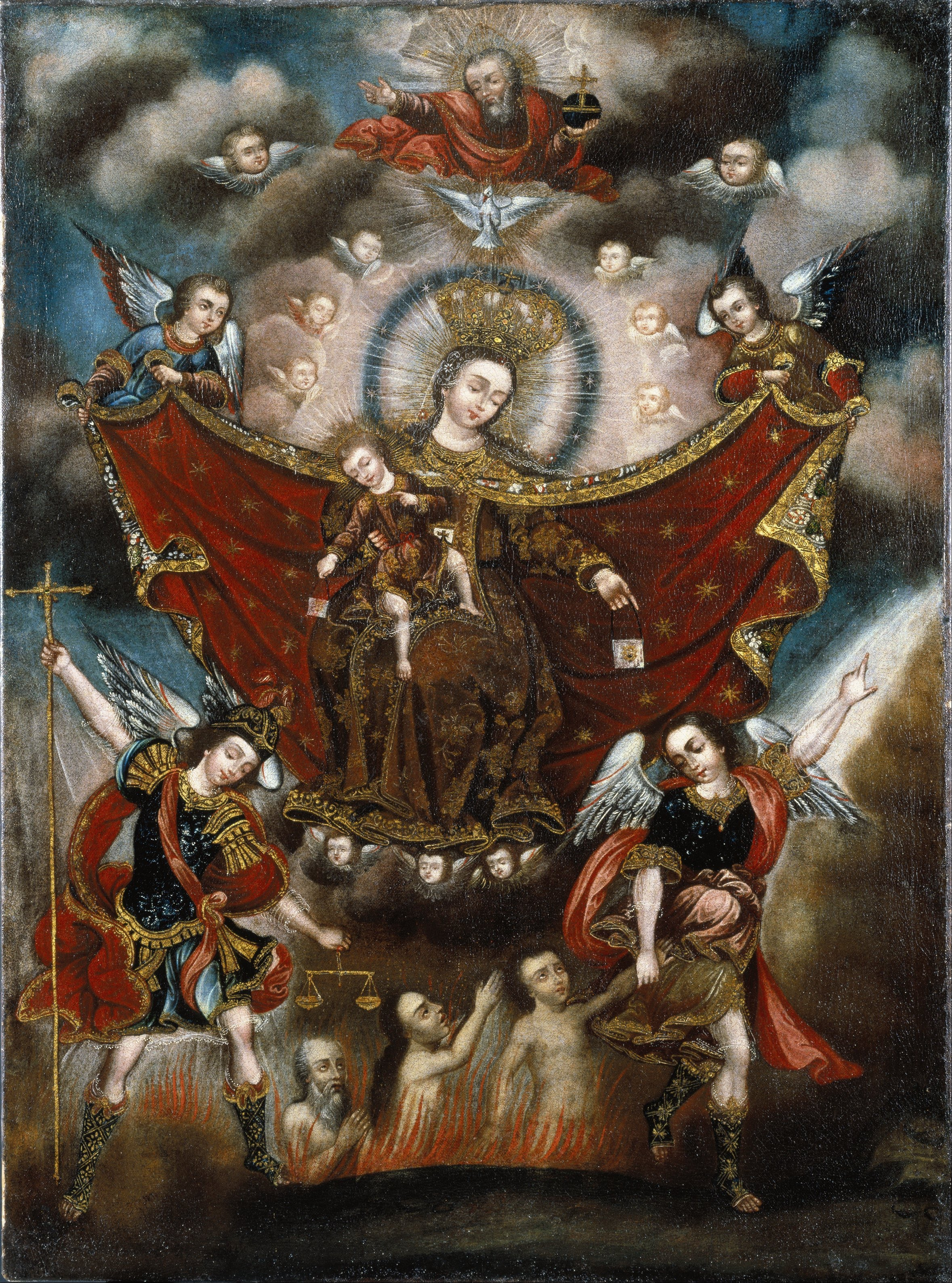
Virgin of Carmel Saving Souls in Purgatory,. Peru. Circle of Diego Quispe Tito, 17th century, collection of the Brooklyn Museum

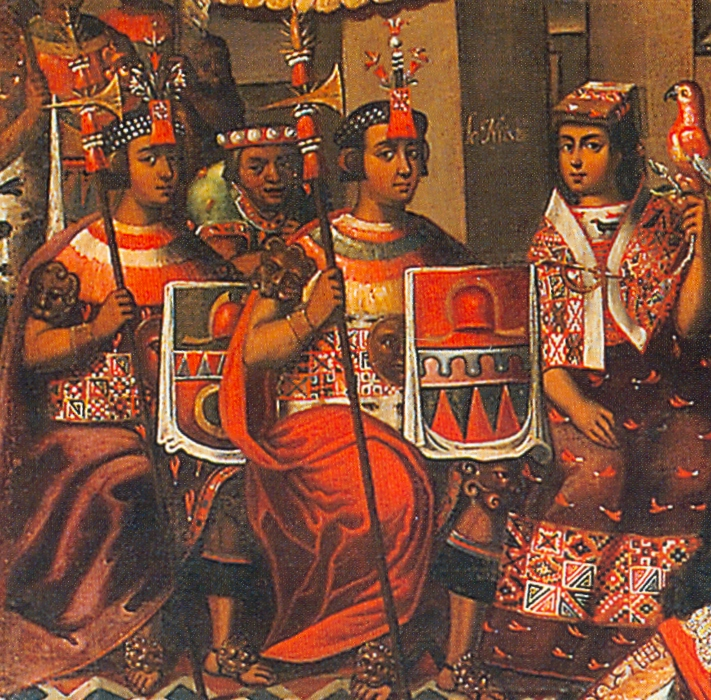
The Marriage of Captain Martin de Loyola to Beatriz Ñusta, detail, c. 1675–1690, Church of la Compañía de Jesús, Cuzco, Peru.

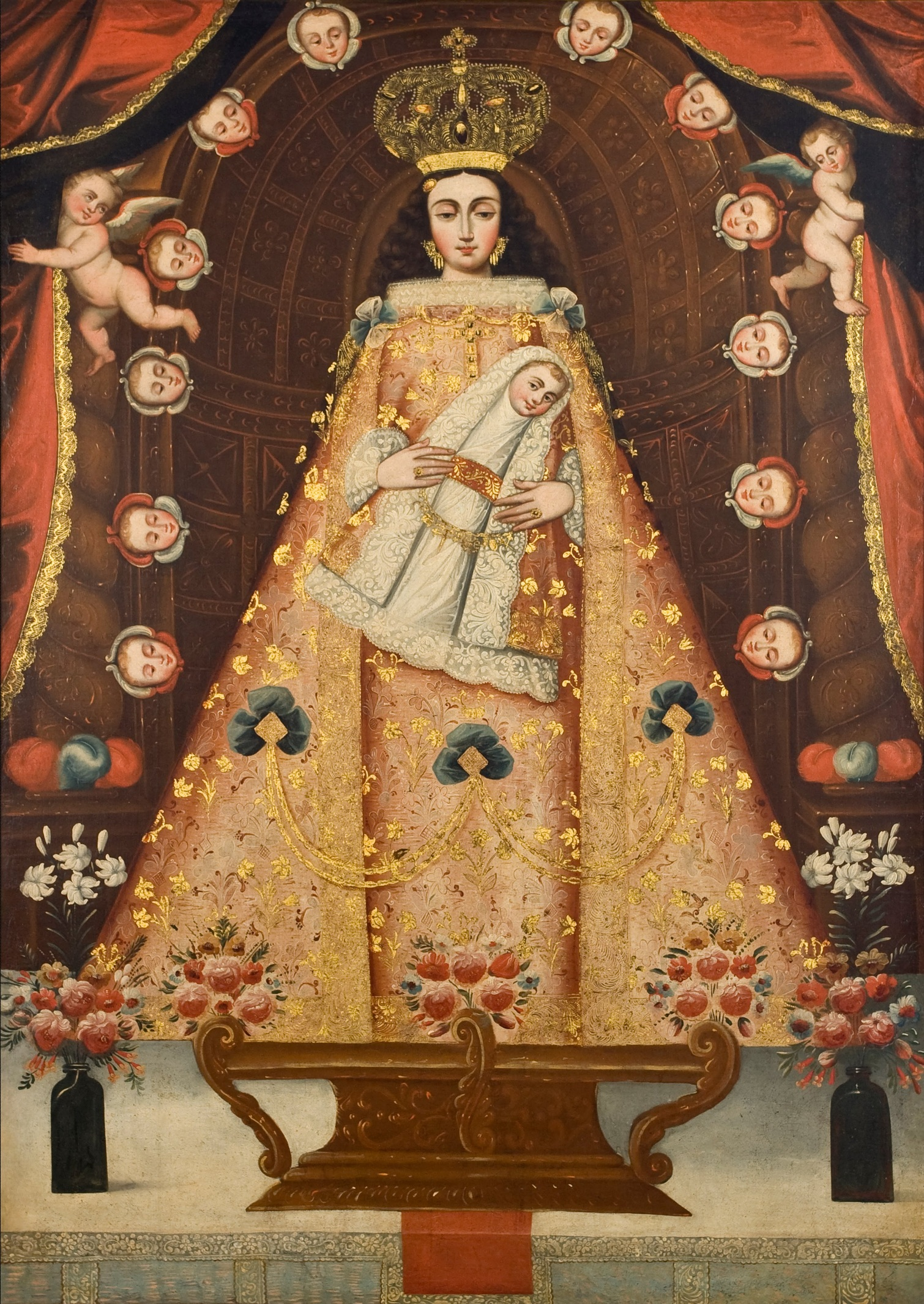
Our Lady of Bethelem, Peru, anonymous, 18th century

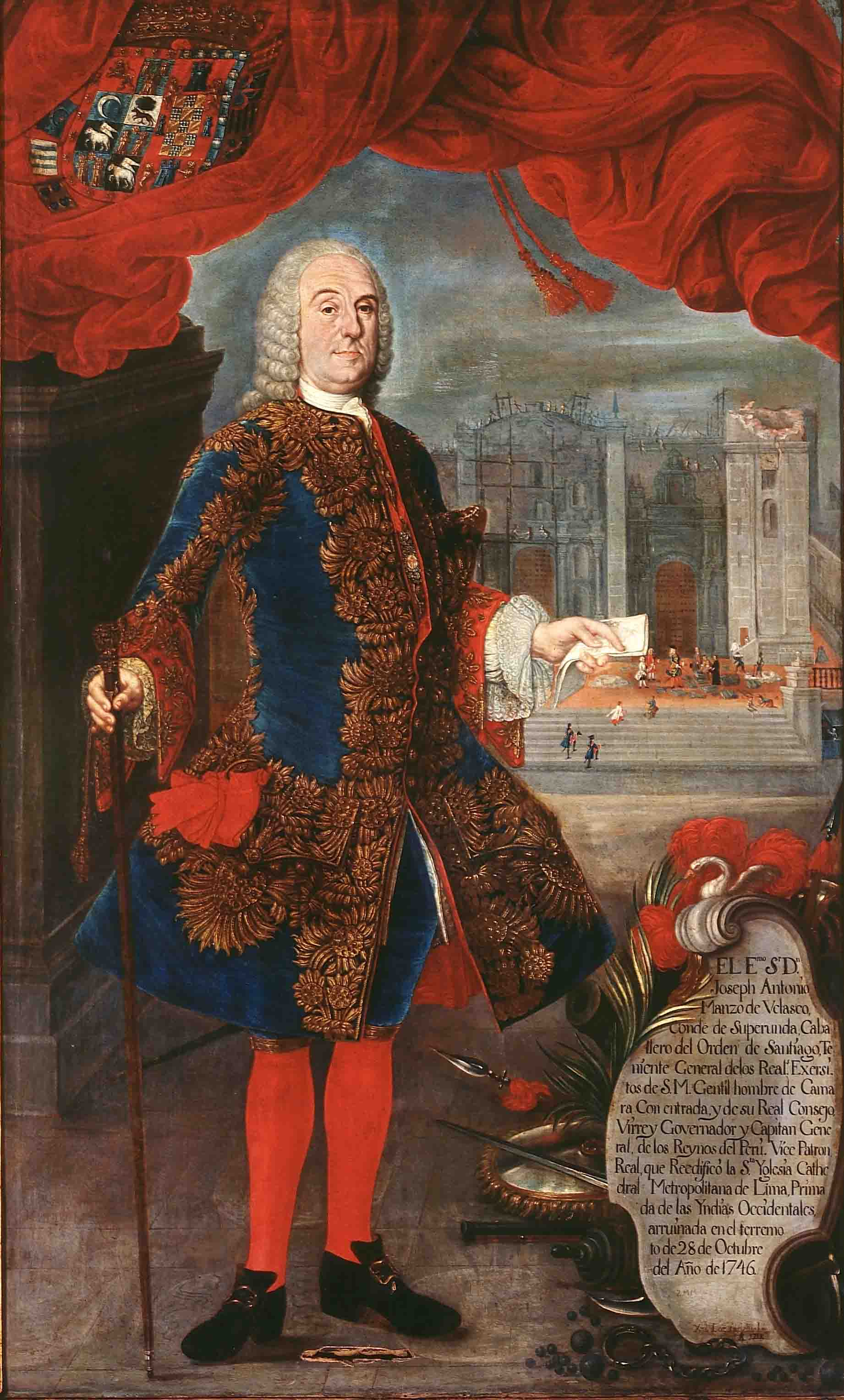
Viceroy of Peru, Don José Manso de Velasco, 1st Count of Superunda 18th c.

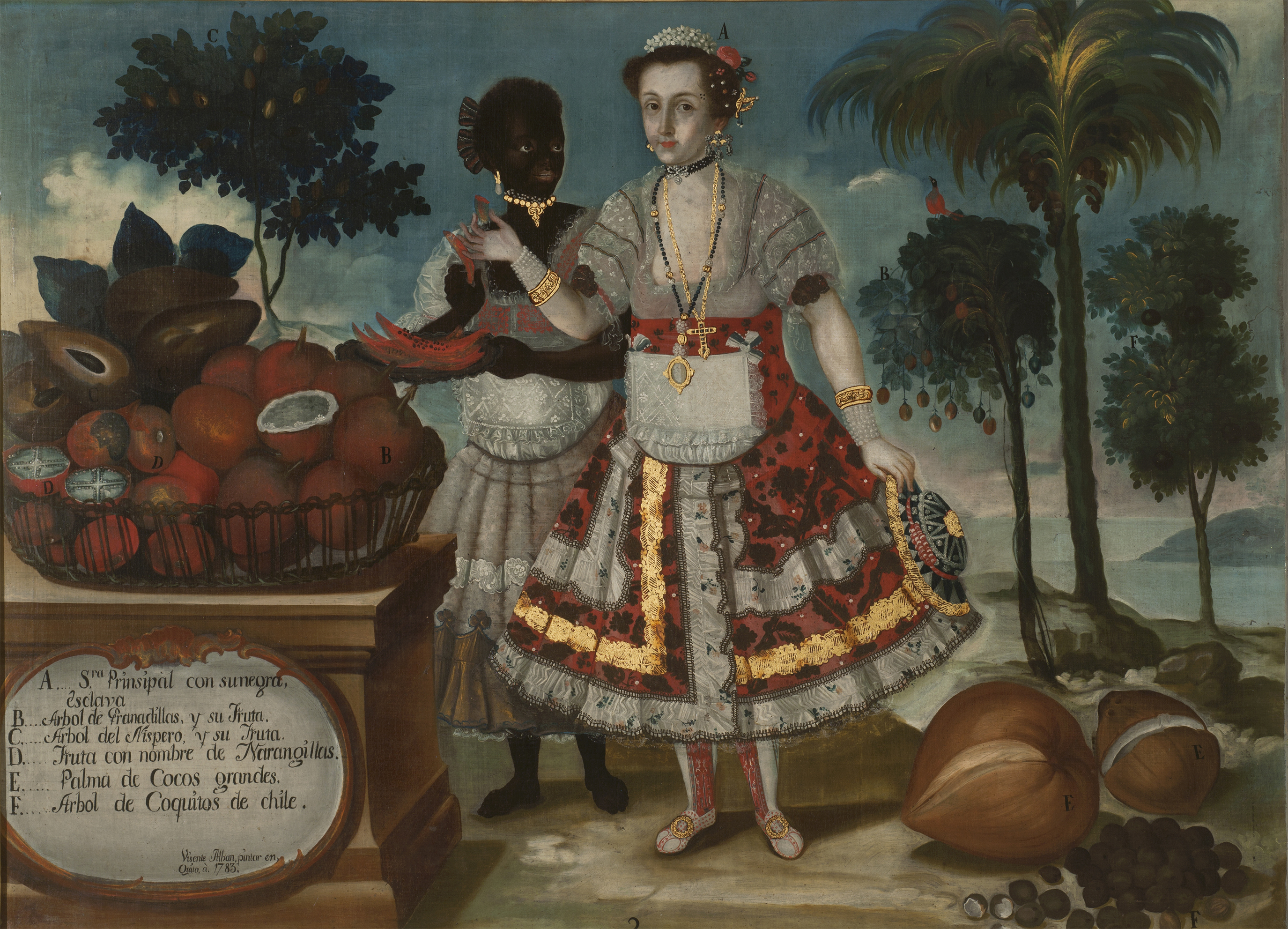
Vicente Alban. Spanish woman and her black slave. Quito, 18th century

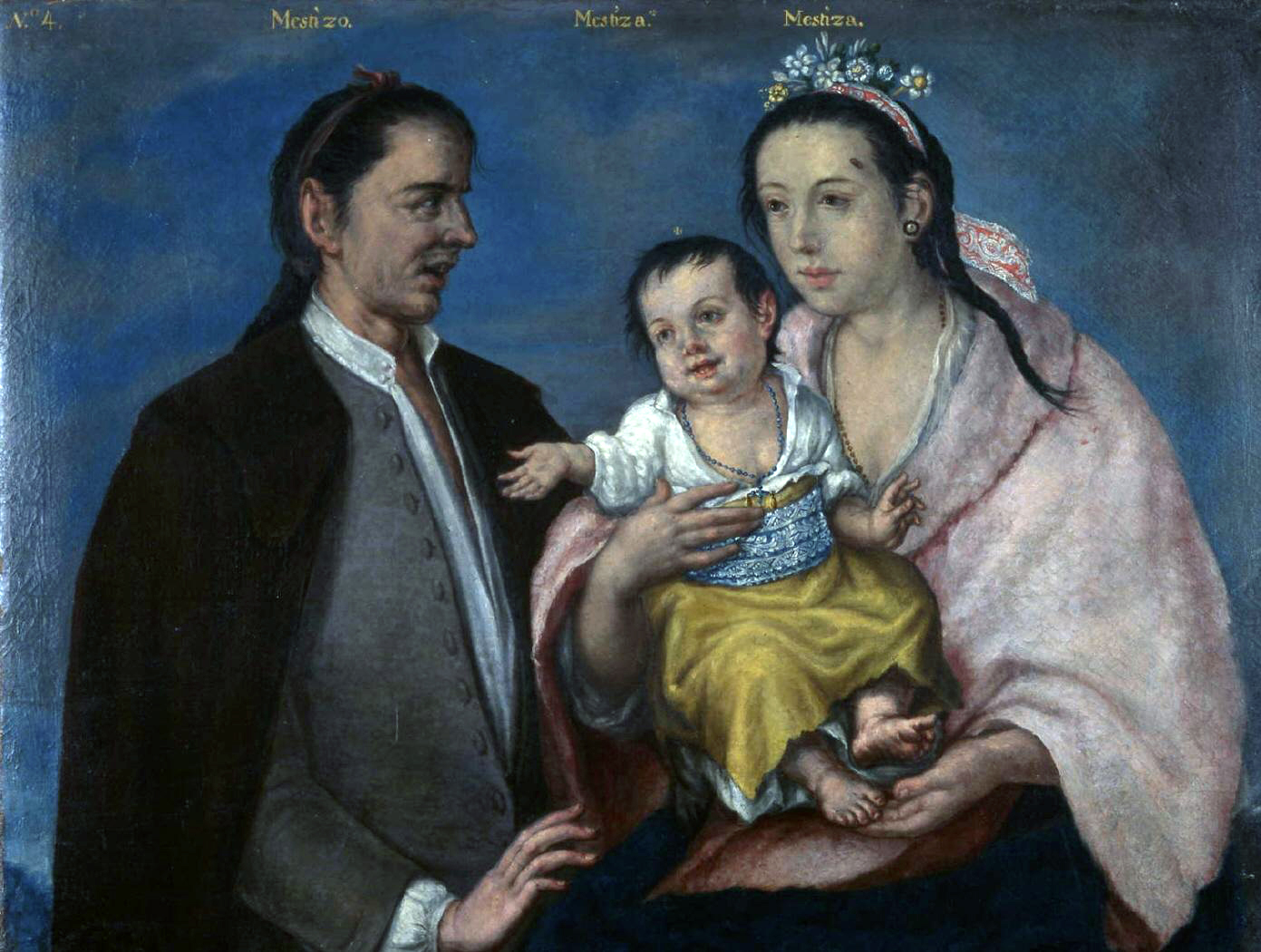
Mestizo, Mestiza, Mestizo Peruvian casta painting, showing intermarriage within a casta category. 18th c.

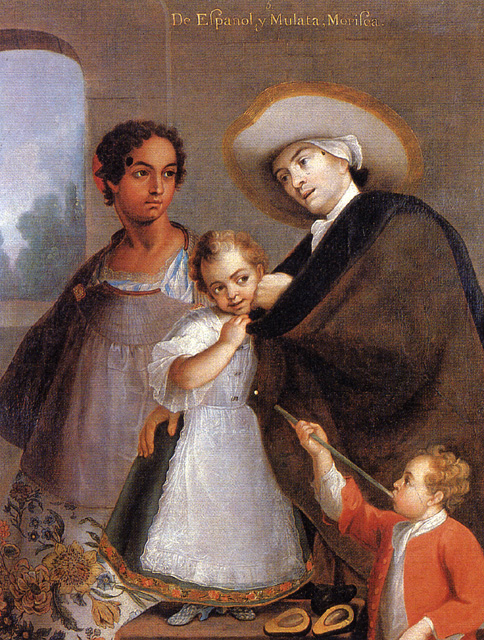
Miguel Cabrera (Mexico) Casta painting, From Spaniard and Mulatta, Morisca. Oil on canvas. Private collection. 18th c.

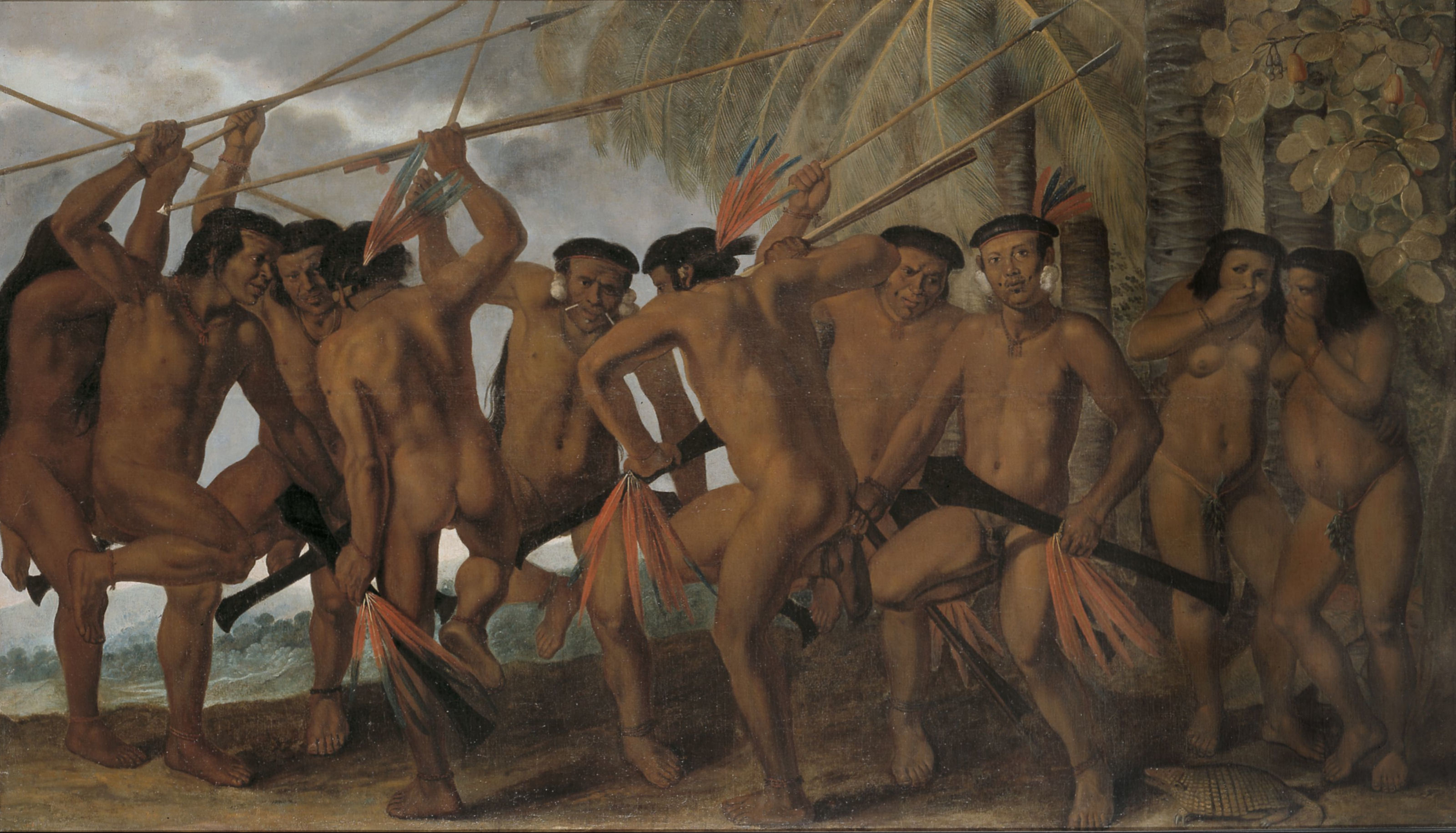
Albert Eckhout, Tupi (Brazil) dancing, 17th c.

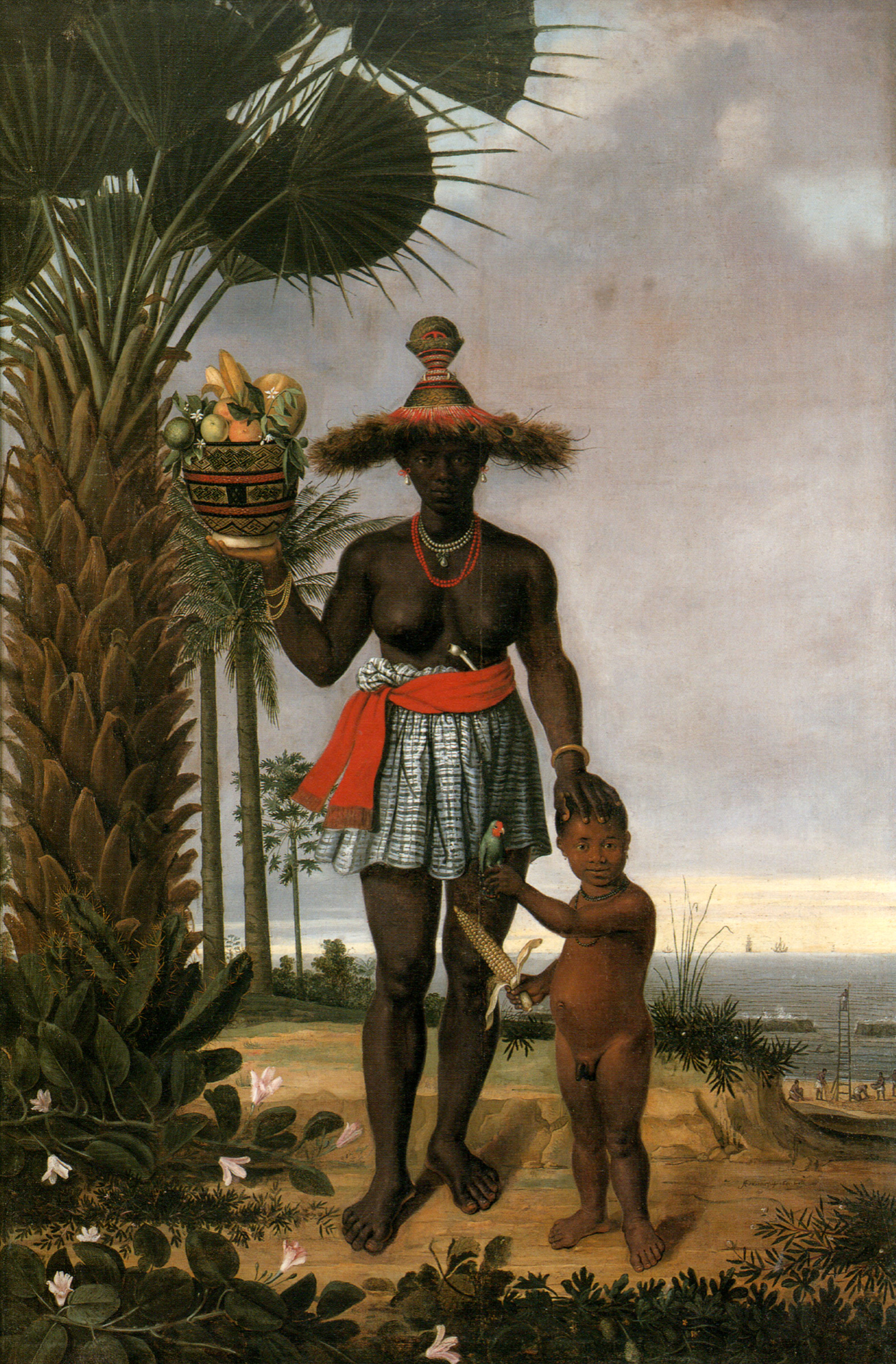
Albert Eckhout African Woman in Brazil, 17th c.

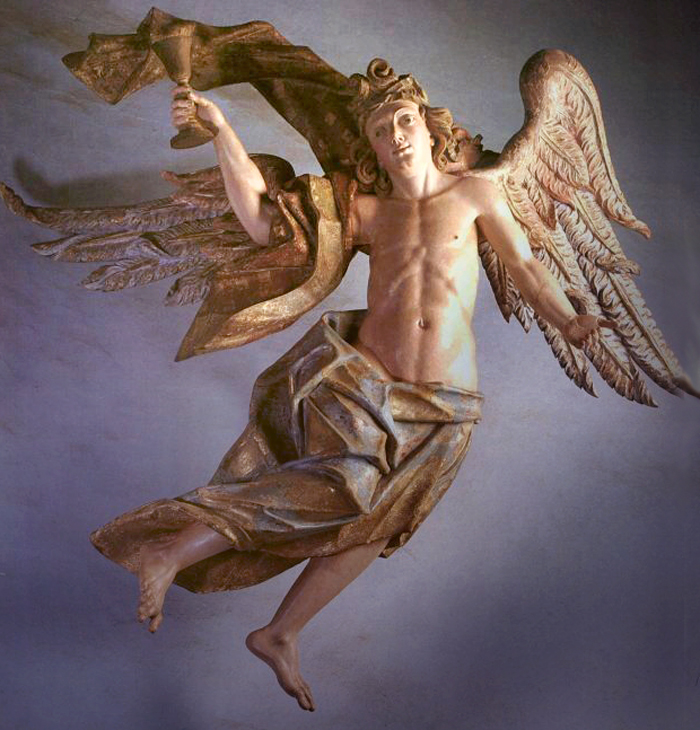
Aleijadinho(Brazil): Angel of the Passion, ca. 1799. Congonhas do Campo

Alexander von Humboldt (German) Drawing of volcano and climatic zones

== Nineteenth-century ==
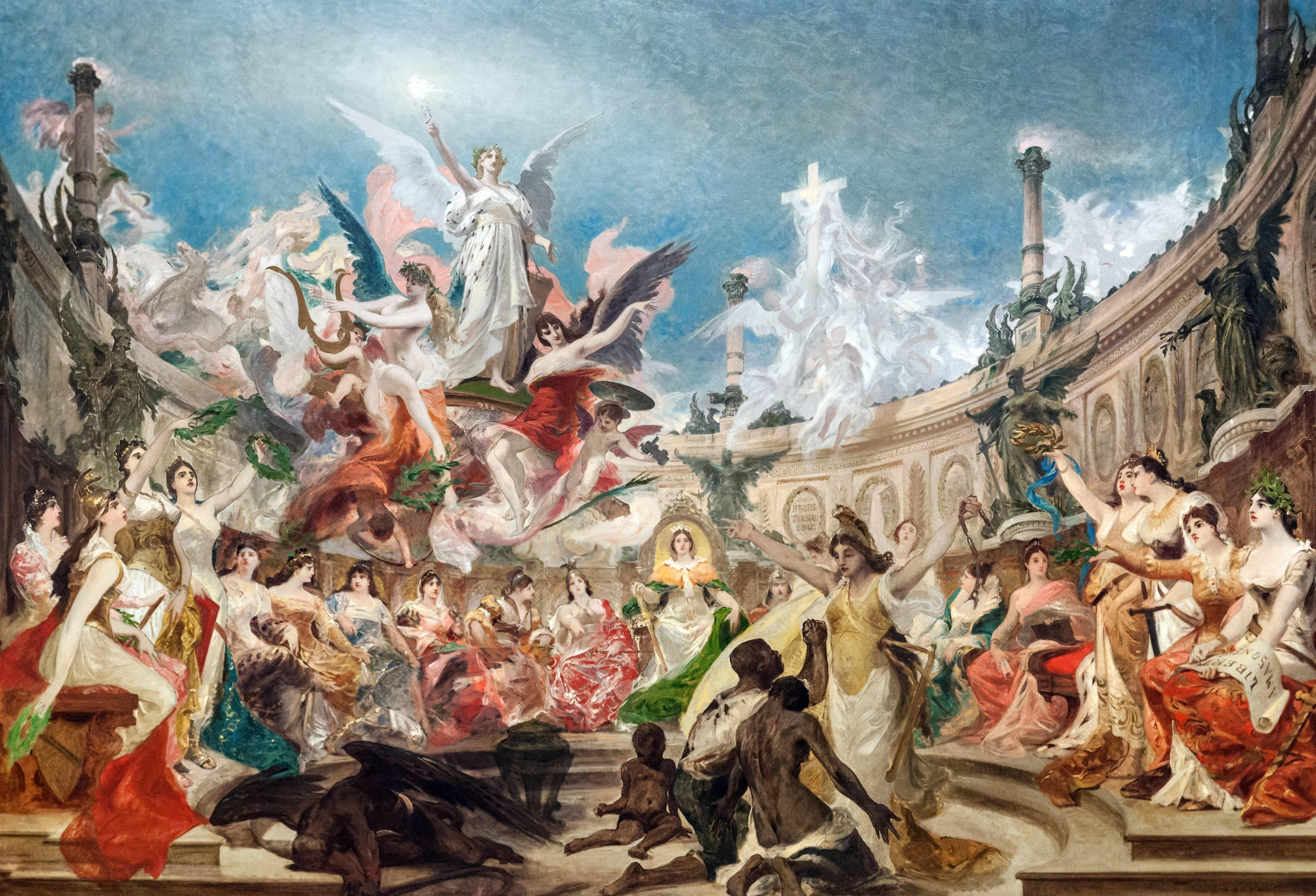
A libertação dos escravos, by Brazilian painter Pedro Américo, oil, 1889

During the 19th Century, parallel to the formation of the first Nation State in Central America and South America, art assumed a political and social role. Far from being a mere aesthetic element, the latin-american artistic production worked like a reflection of its time, mirroring the structural organization of these new societies, and also building and collaborating with the perpetuation of its new subjects through visual representations.

In the first decades, there was a strong presence throughout the continent in which art get’s pulled close to the iconography. In such context, it’s understood that paintings as a iconographic kind of artistic production that works like a visual language that tries to comprehend the meaning of symbols, metaphors and narrative elements, be it explicit or implicit in an artwork, focusing on the analysis of what is being represented and its reasons.

Throughout the period, it has been observed that artistic sources transcended the realm of mere visual registry, assuming the role of a political, social, ethnic and economical construction of the society. The representative power of Latin American art from this period can be delimited by dividing it into two characteristics: the representation of power among individuals within the social sphere, and the paintings representing historical moments singled out as forming the nation.

=== Historical and Academicist Painting ===
At the end of the 18th century and throughout the 19th century, the concepts of nationality and belonging gained centrality in Enlightenment intellectual debates. With the advance of emancipatory sentiments, the subsequent waves of independence, especially in the Americas, and the separatist movements, the need arose to build a collective identity. This effort aimed to enable citizens to recognize themselves as part of a broad social body that would come to demand commitment, loyalty and responsibility from them: the Nation.

To perpetuate this image of unity, States employed various apparatuses as political artifices. Among them, historical painting played a fundamental role in creating a common past that served, among other purposes, as a model of moral correction for citizens. These works recovered past episodes, usually led by mythical figures, portrayed in real or allegorical form to consolidate a mythological narrative of national aggrandizement. Nationalism is often seen being rescued by historical painting artists to pave the implicit discourse conveyed by the works.

Throughout 19th-century Latin America, one perceives the strength of this artistic genre in the fortification of the young nations that were emancipating themselves from their Metropoles. By way of example, the Chilean painter Manuel Antonio Caro recorded the moment of the Abdication of Bernardo O’Higgins which took place on 28 January 1823, when the Supreme Leader of Chile resigned from power to avoid civil war in the country. Pressured by the aristocracy and by uprisings in the provinces, he handed over the office to a Government Junta. The work, conceived over half a century after the event, aims to illustrate a historical passage deemed important for the national memory of Chile.

In Brazil, Victor Meirelles, a painter trained at the Imperial Academy of Fine Arts, records an anthological moment of Brazilian history by painting what was imagined at the time to have been the setting of the First Mass in Brazil, held on 26 April 1500. The homonymous canvas, finished in 1861, presents a crafted and glorified vision of the Catholic Church, a wide participant in the formation of the structural roots of Brazilian society throughout the entire colonial period; it also works the image of the first Portuguese colonisers who conquered the territory after the landing of the squadrons of Pedro Álvares Cabral on the lands that would later come to be recognised as Brazil. Such representations present the narratives that the Brazilian Imperial State at the time wished to perpetuate into the imaginary of its citizens.

=== Hierarchical Representations of Power ===
Nineteenth-century iconography visually exposes the social pyramid of the period and the relationships that shaped individuals across multiple realities. In this type of work, small details such as the way subjects were positioned in space by the artist, their clothing, accessories, and how they were illuminated on the canvas specified which social type was being represented in paintings, prints, and frescoes, revealing who held power and who was subjected to it.

The National elite, broadly influenced by European habits, sought to be represented as dissociated from the supposed tropical backwardness associated with other Latin American peoples, including Indigenous, Black, and mixed-race populations. These new aristocracies sought to associate themselves, through artistic representations and objects such as clothing, furniture, and jewels, as heirs to the civility of their ancestors from Europe.

=== Gallery – Foreign artists in Latin America ===
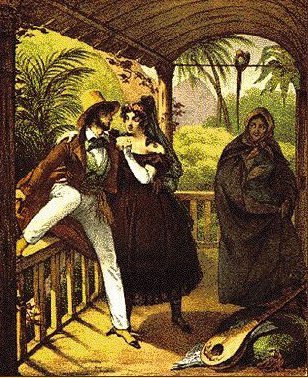
Johann Moritz Rugendas (German) Costumes in Rio, Brazil 1823

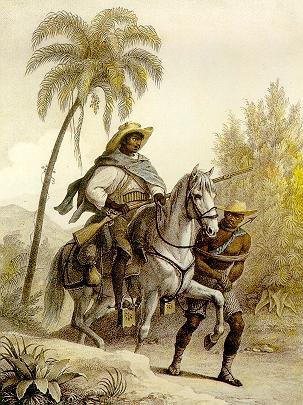
Johann Moritz Rugendas (German) Slave hunter, Brazil 1823

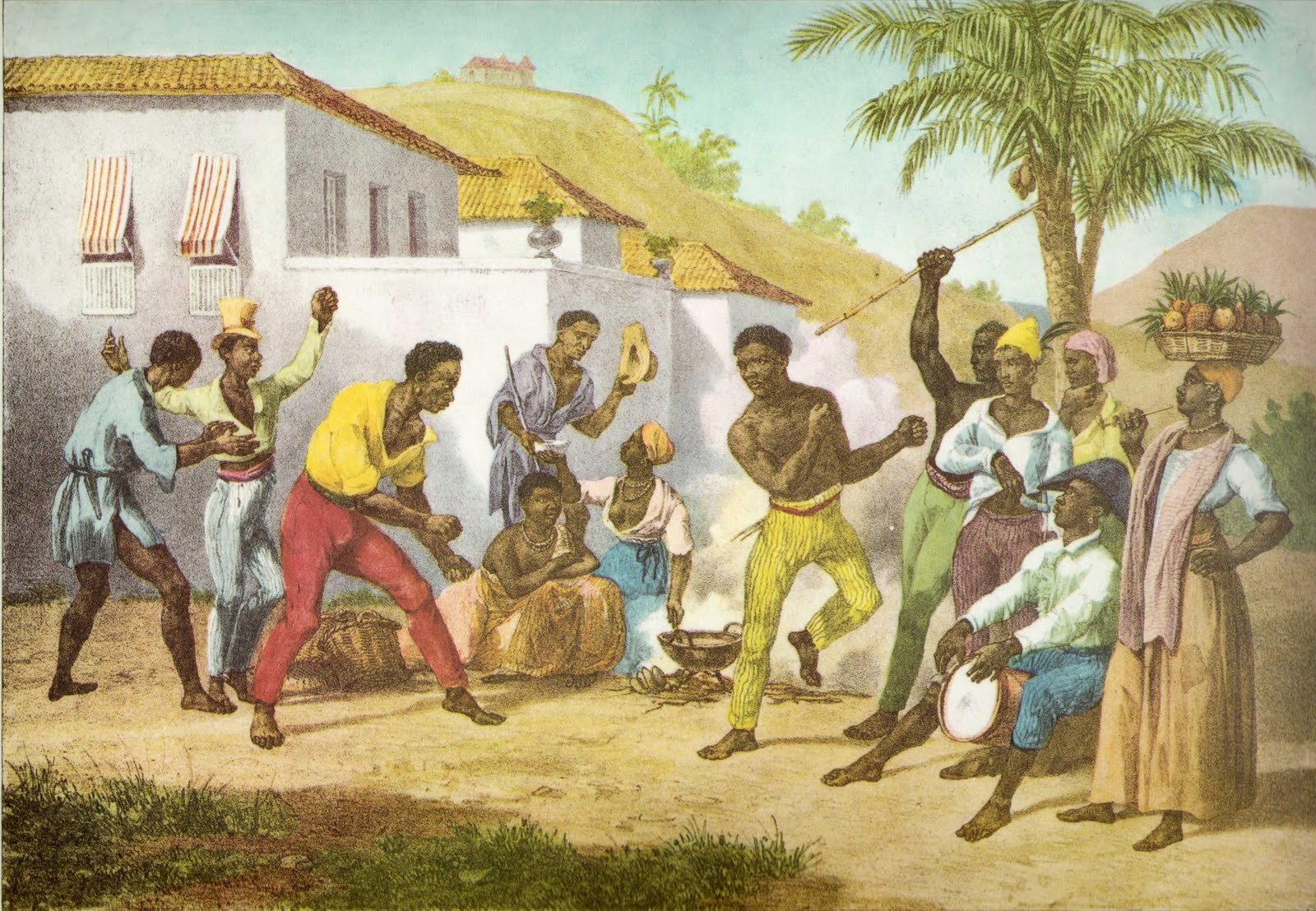
Johann Moritz Rugendas (German) Capoeira or the Dance of War Brazil 1835.

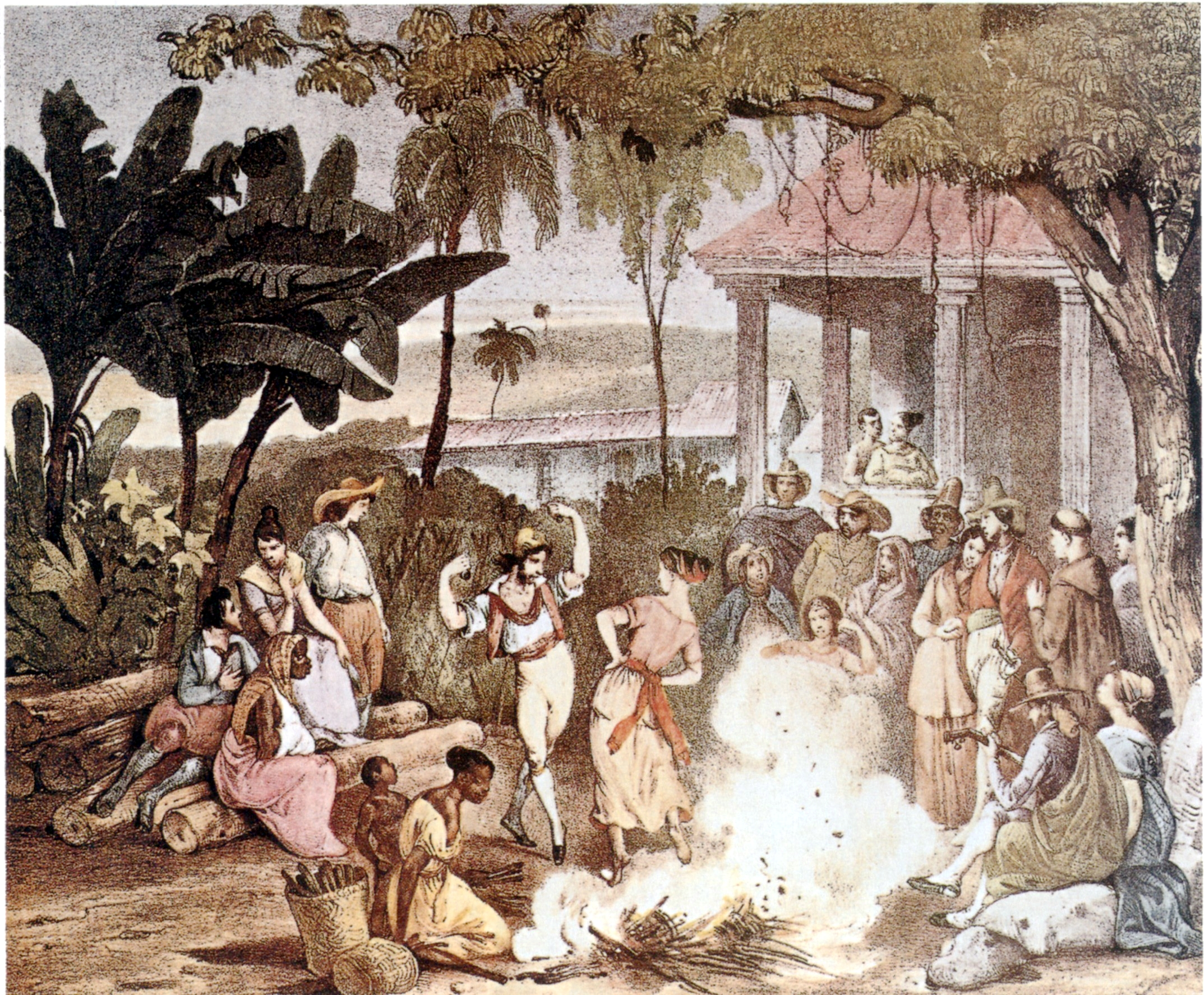
Johann Moritz Rugendas Brazilian dance lundu Brazil 1835

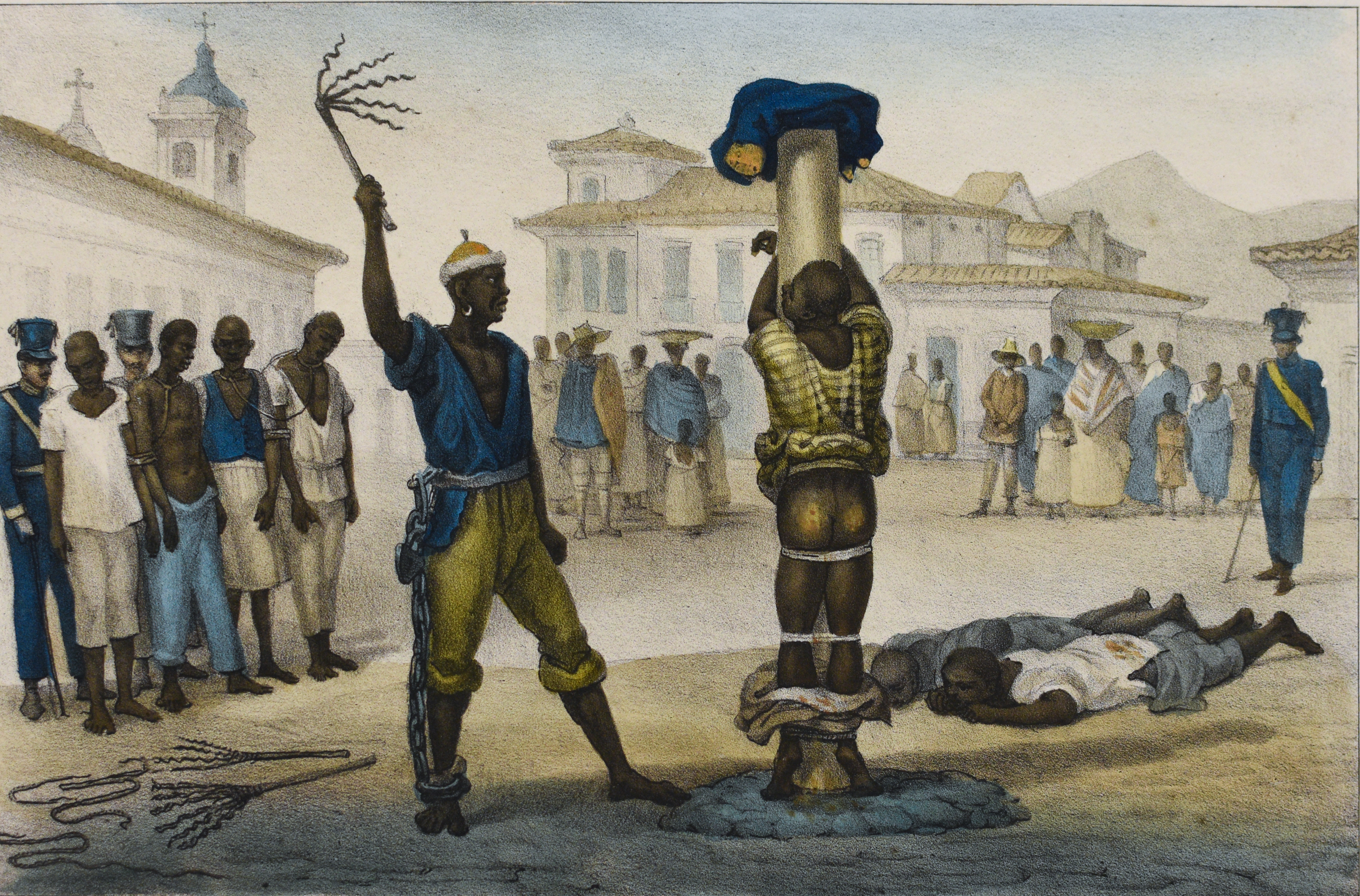
Jean Baptiste Debret (French) "L’execution de la Punition du Fouet" ("Execution of the Punishment of the Whip") (Brazil)

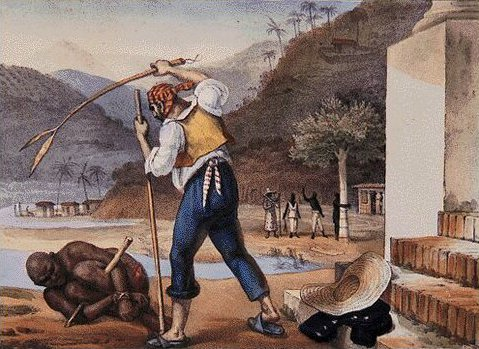
Jean Baptiste Debret (French) "Feitors corrigeant des negres" ("Plantation overseers disciplining blacks") Brazil

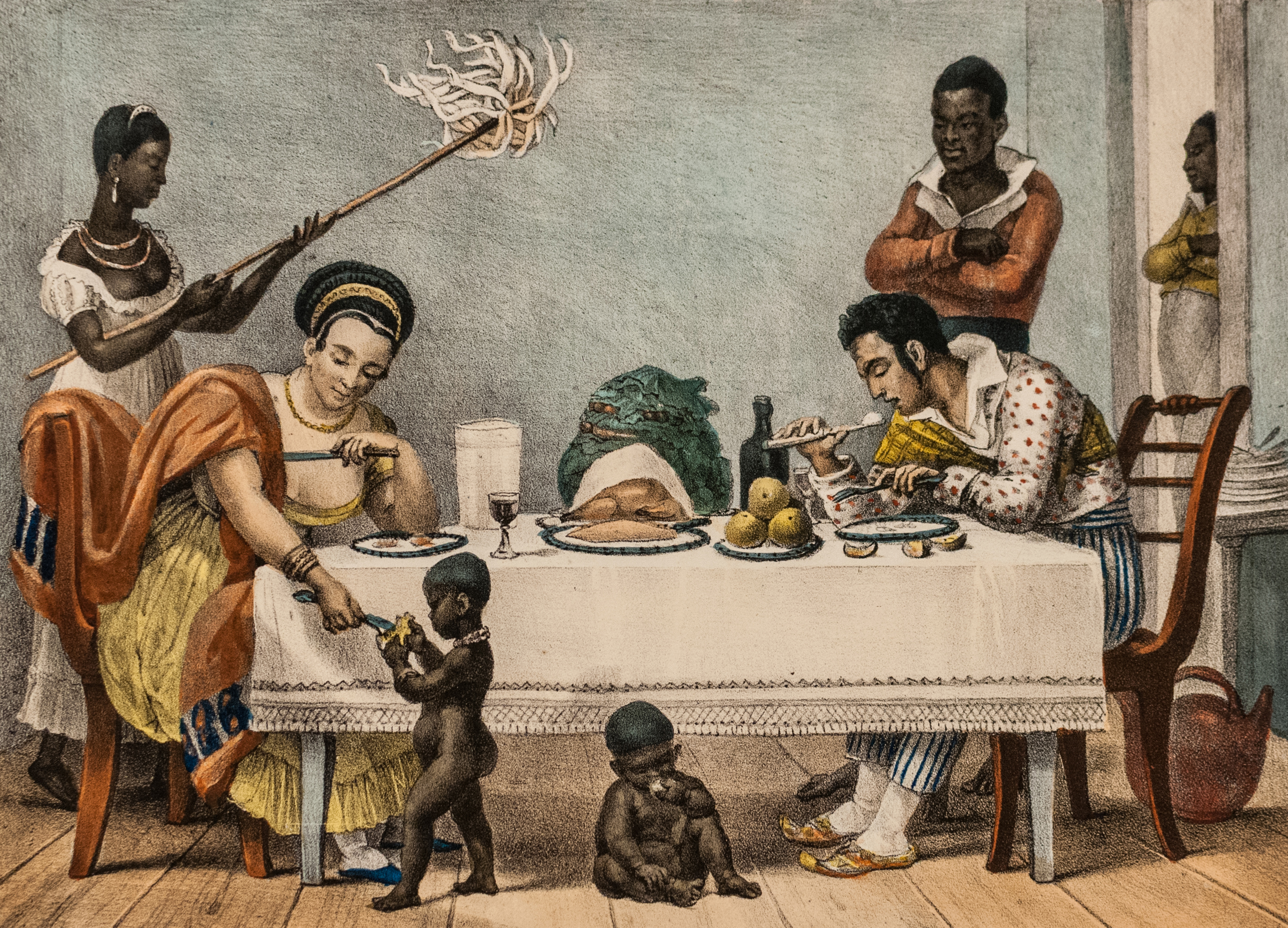
Jean Baptiste Debret (French) Family dining, Brazil

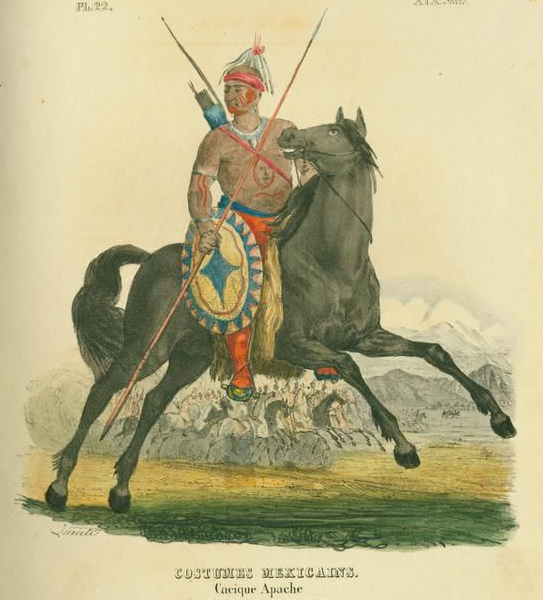
Claudio Linati (Italian) Apache chief. Mexico 1828.

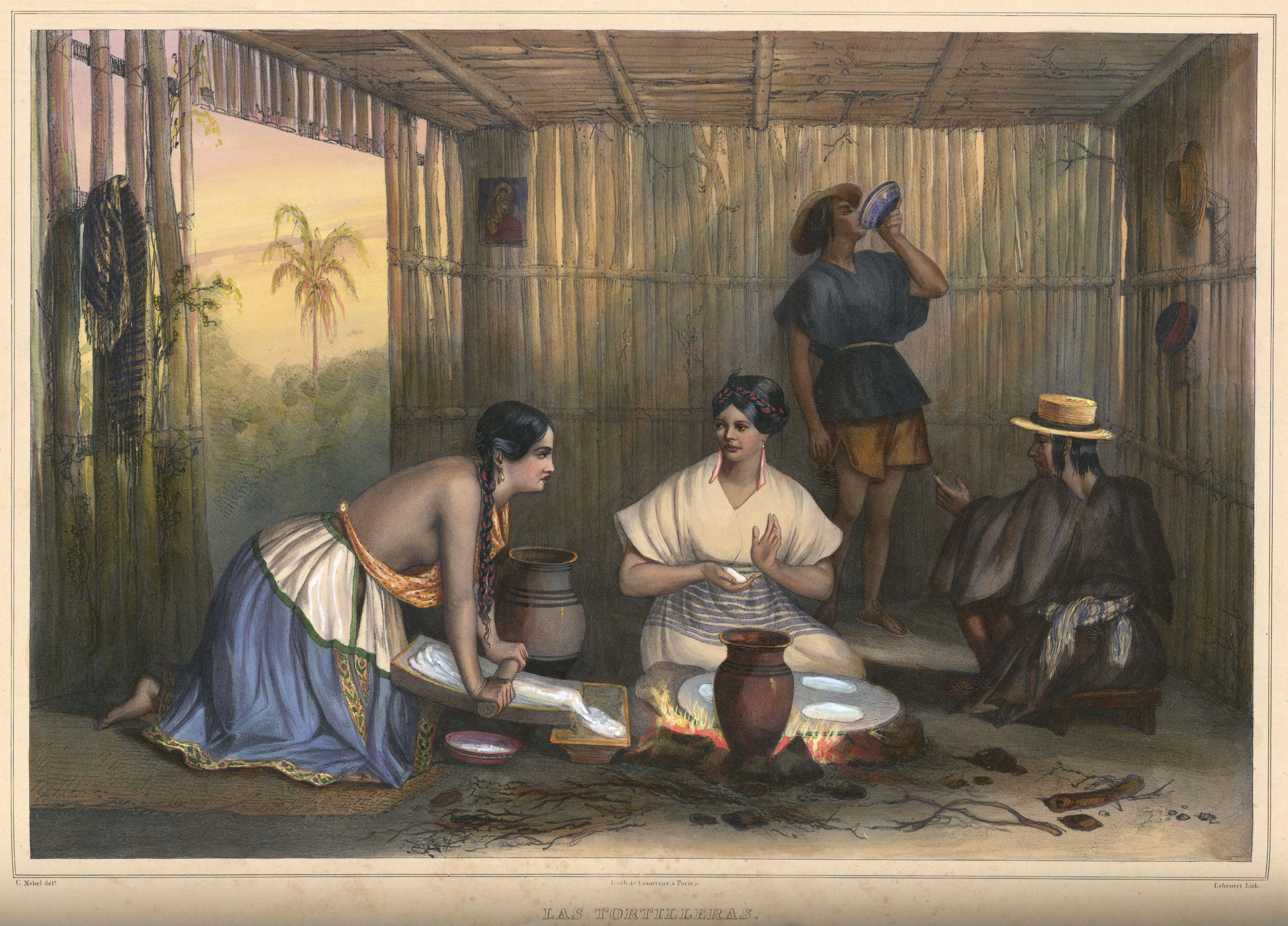
Carl Nebel (German) Las Tortilleras, Voyage pittoresque et archéologique dans la partie la plus intéressante du Mexique. Mexico. Early 19th c.

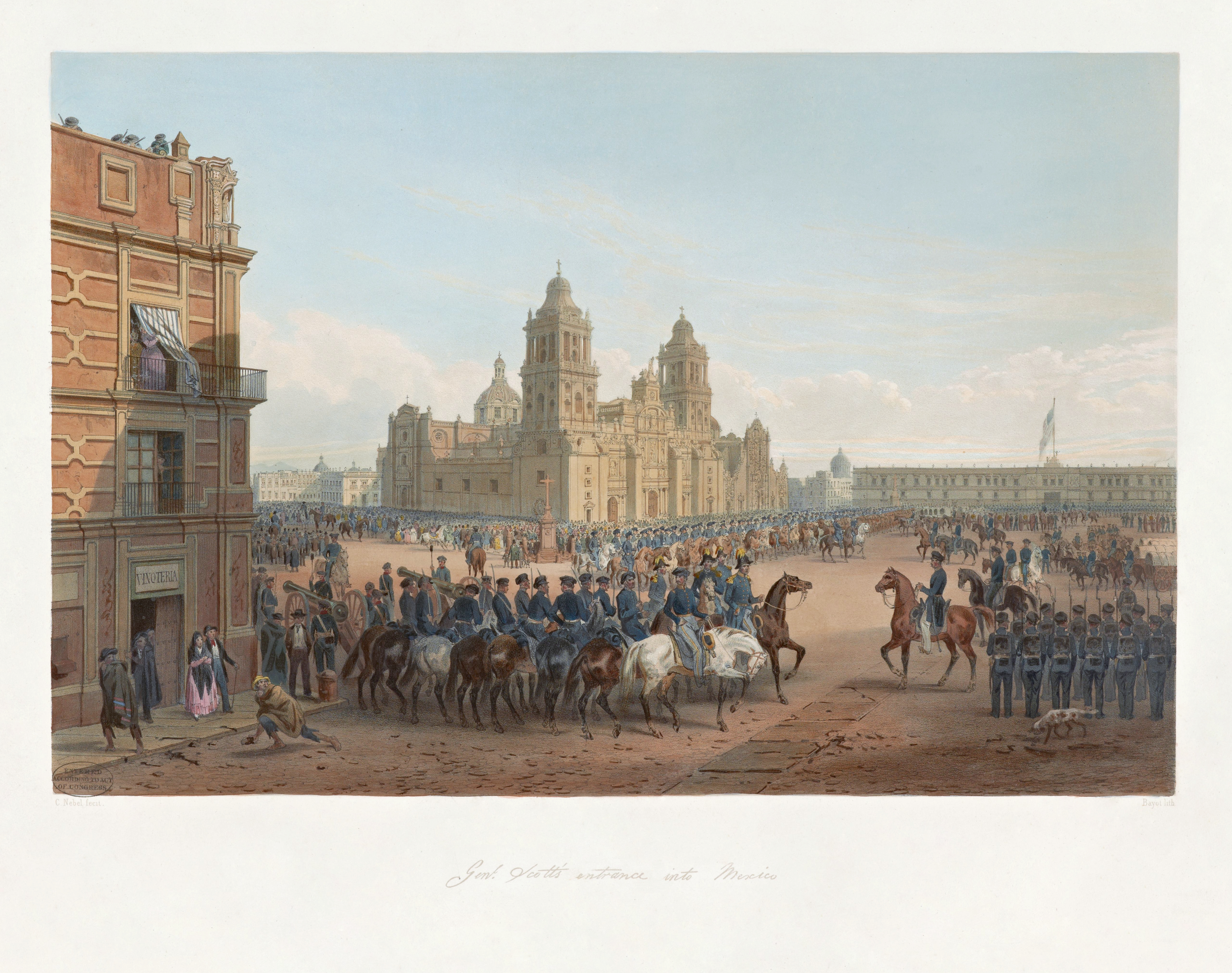
Carl Nebel The Plaza de la Constitución during the Mexican–American War (1846–48)

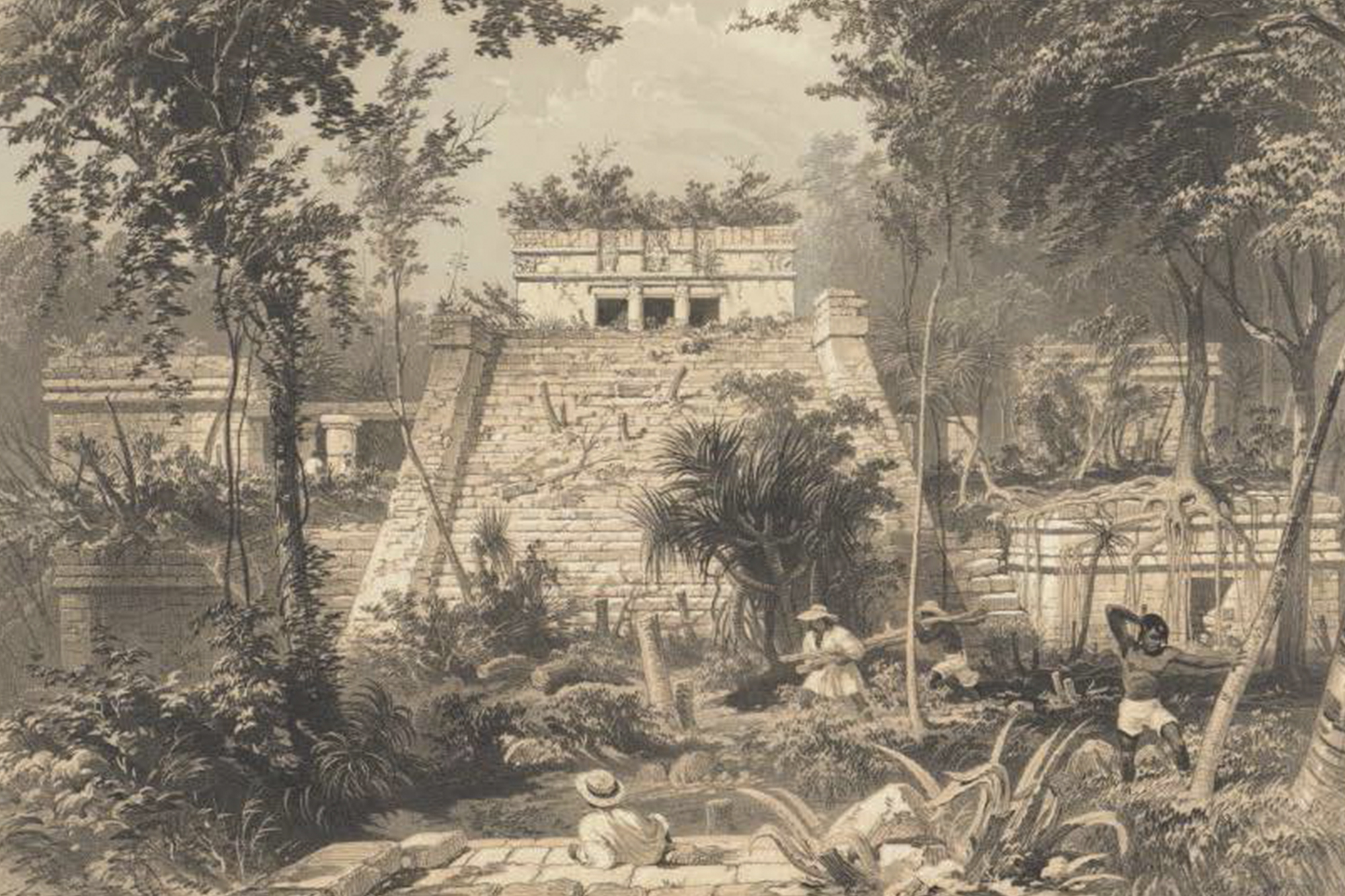
Frederick Catherwood (British). Main temple at Tulum (Mexico), from Views of Ancient Monuments.

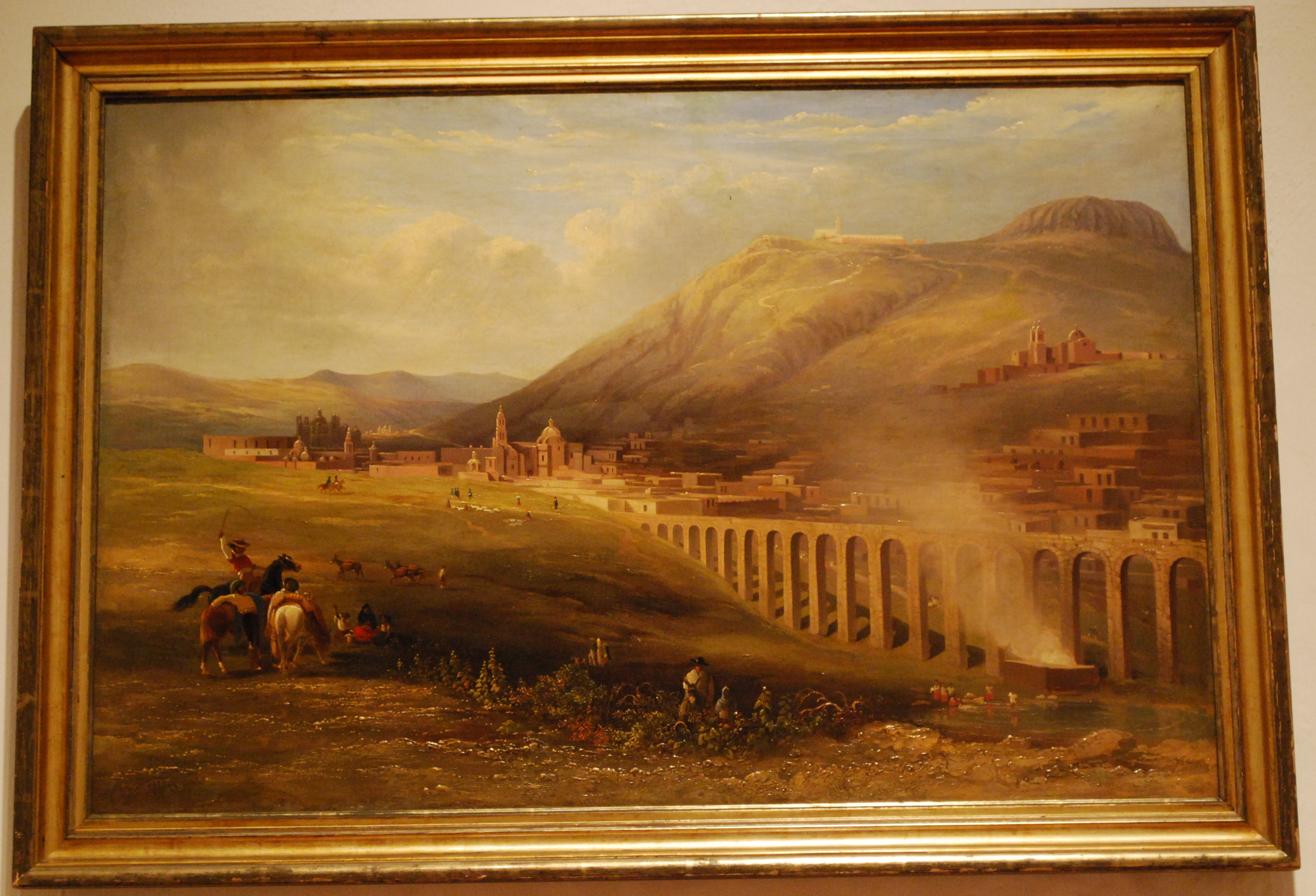
Daniel Thomas Egerton (British), The aqueduct of Zacatecas, Mexico, 1838, now in the Franz Mayer Museum

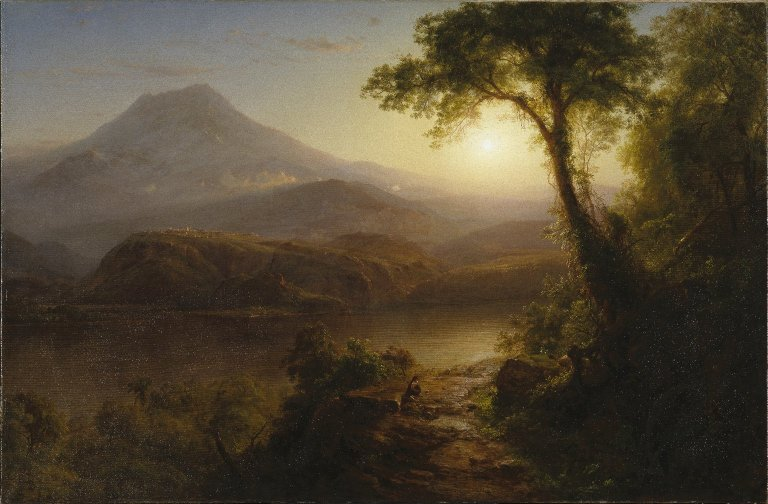
Frederic Edwin Church (U.S.) Tropical Scenery (1873)

=== Gallery – Latin American artists ===
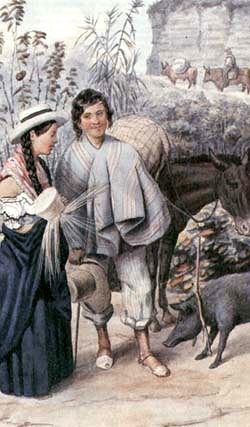
Carmelo Fernández (Venezuela). Muleteer and Hat Weaver in Vélez. 1850. watercolor. National Library of Colombia

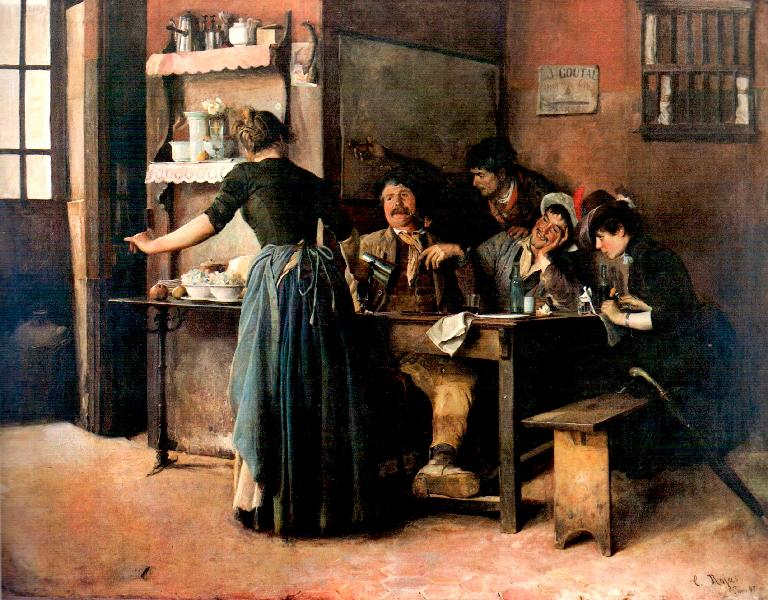
Cristóbal Rojas. (Venezuela) La taberna. 1887.

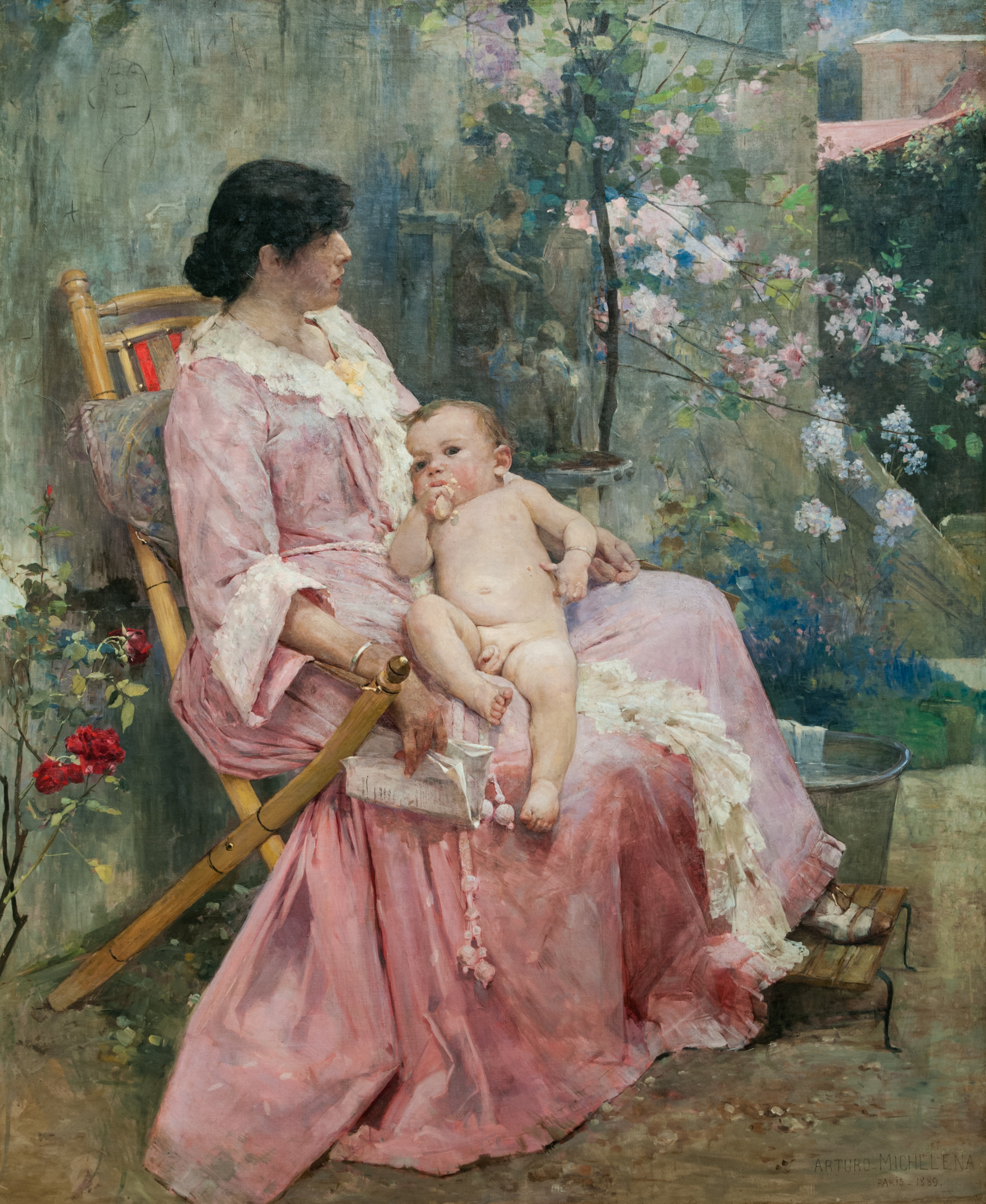
Arturo Michelena (Venezuela) La Joven Madre 1889

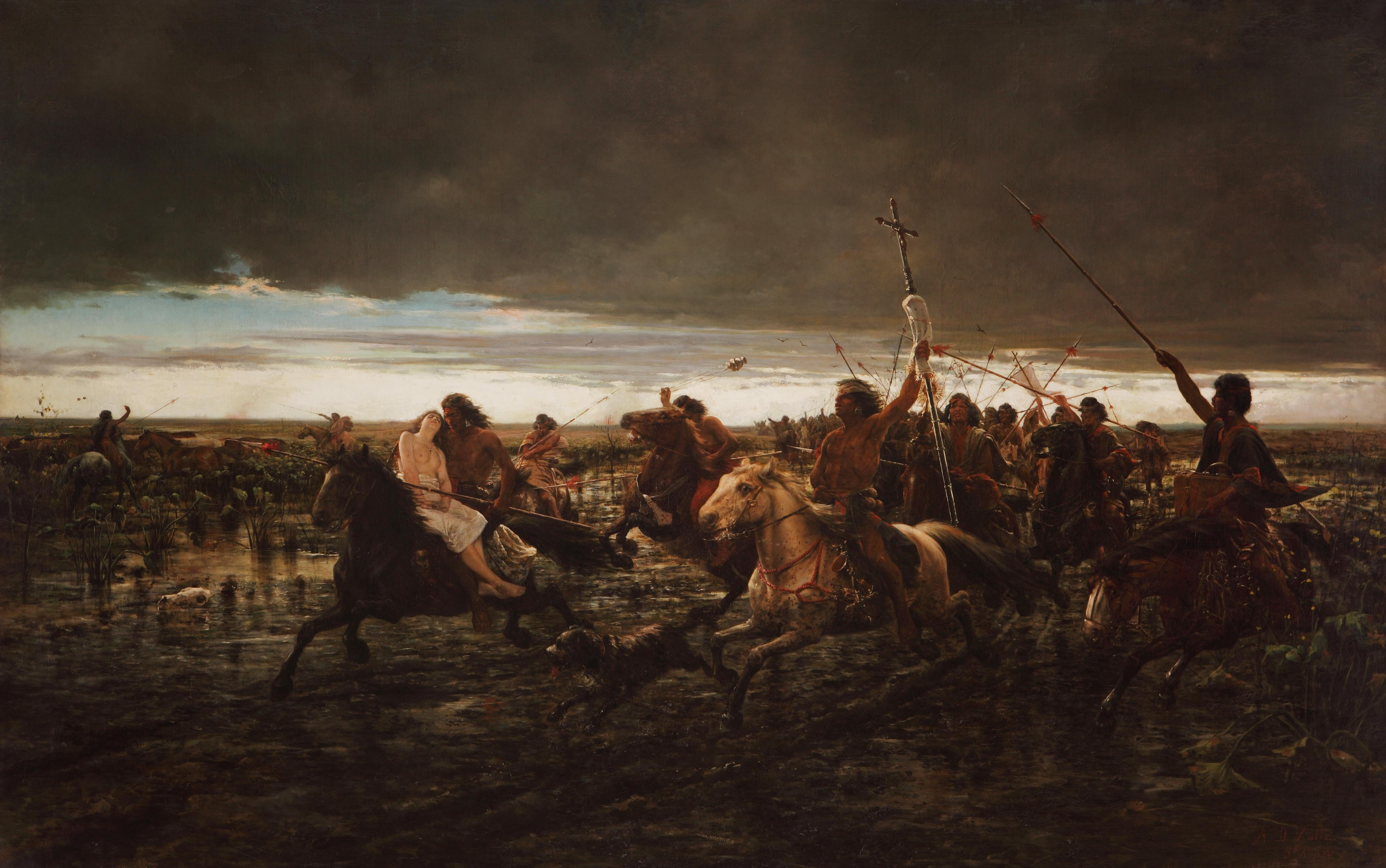
Ángel Della Valle (Argentina) The Return of the Malón (1892)

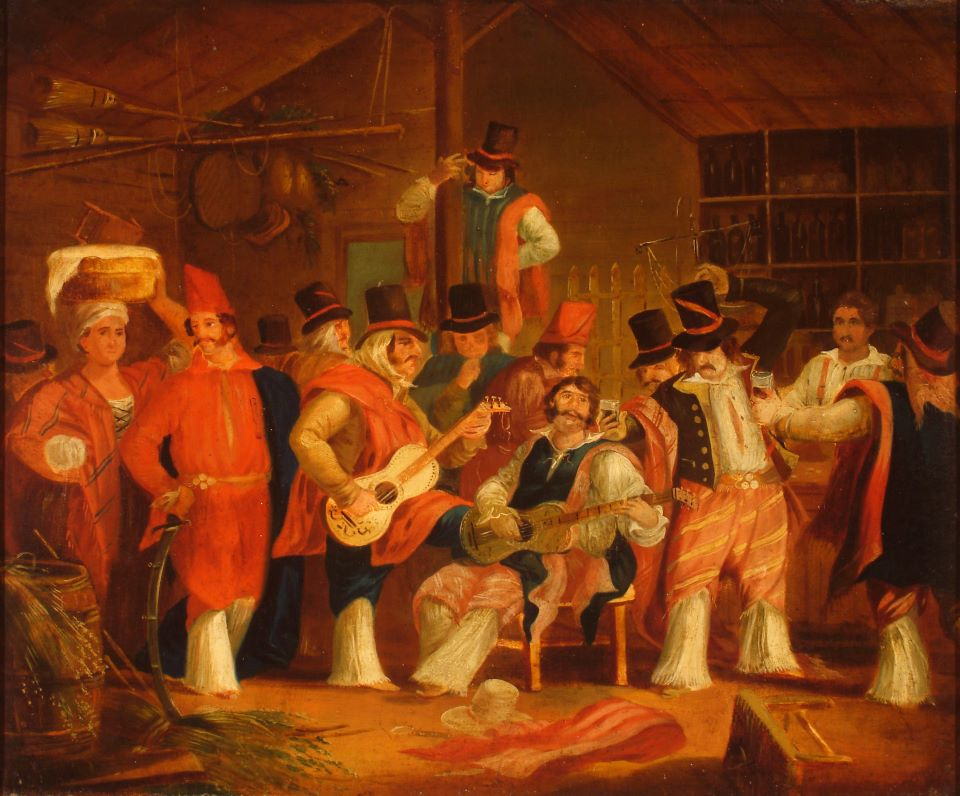
Carlos Morel (Argentina), Payada en una pulpería.

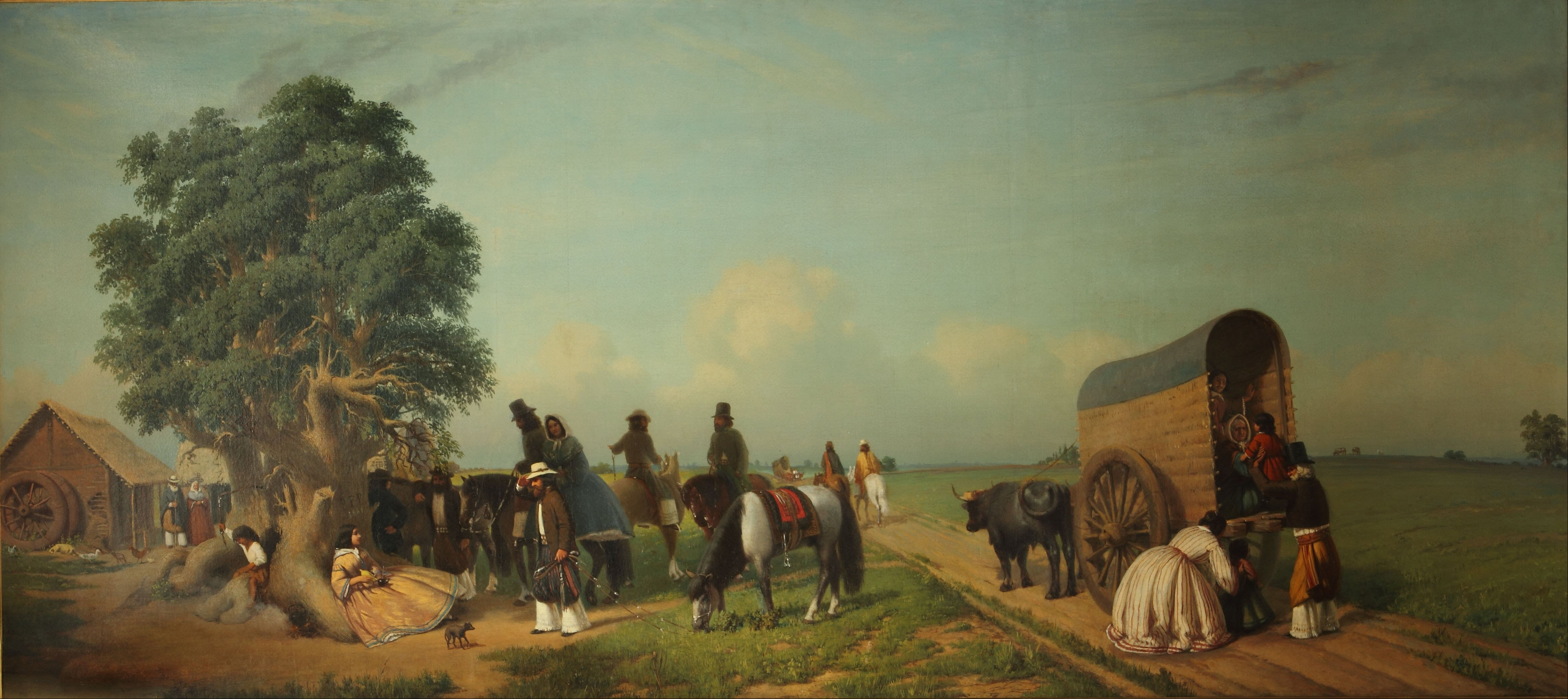
Prilidiano Pueyrredón (Argentina) A Stop in the Countryside

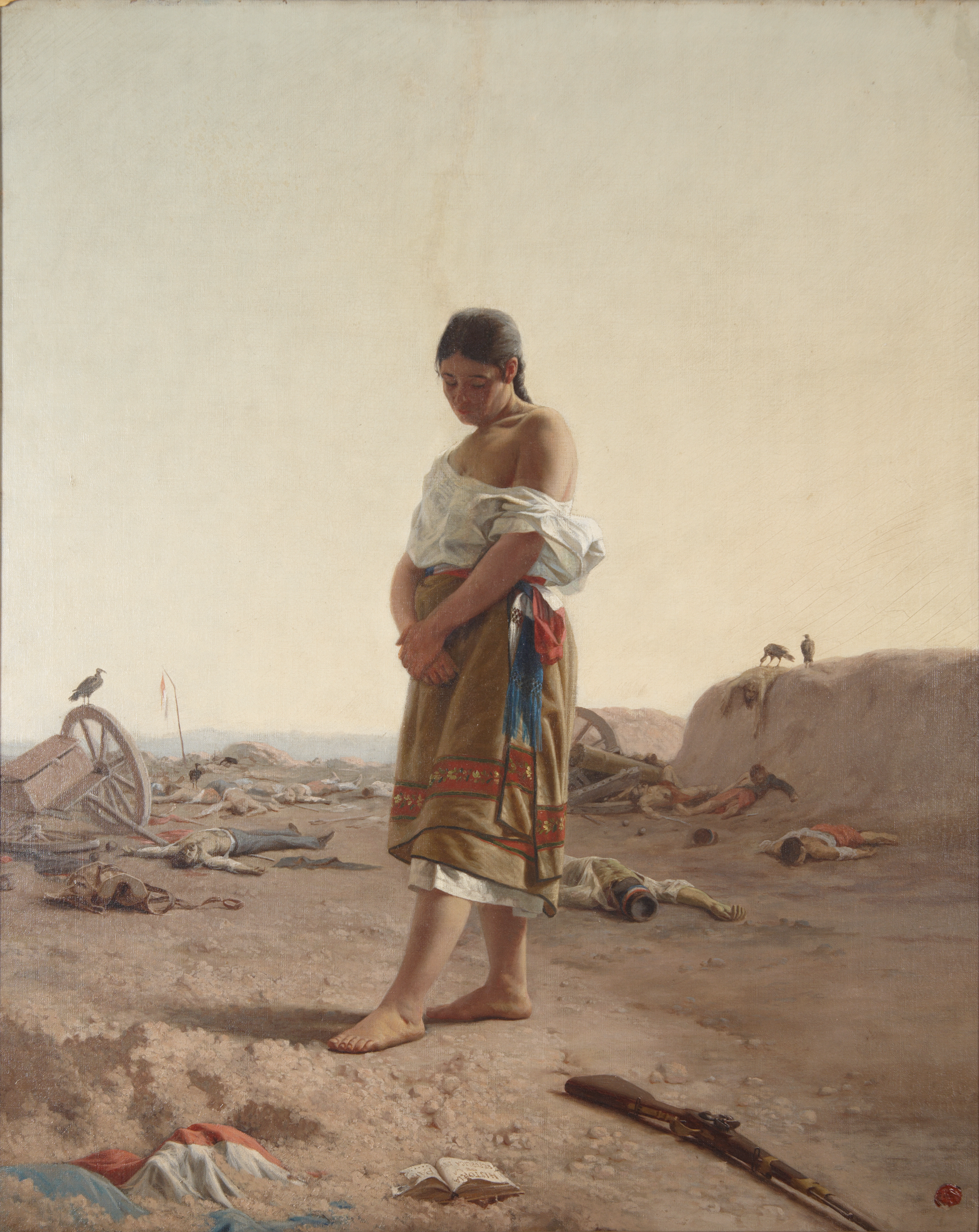
Juan Manuel Blanes (Uruguay) Paraguay: Image of Your Desolate Country (1879)

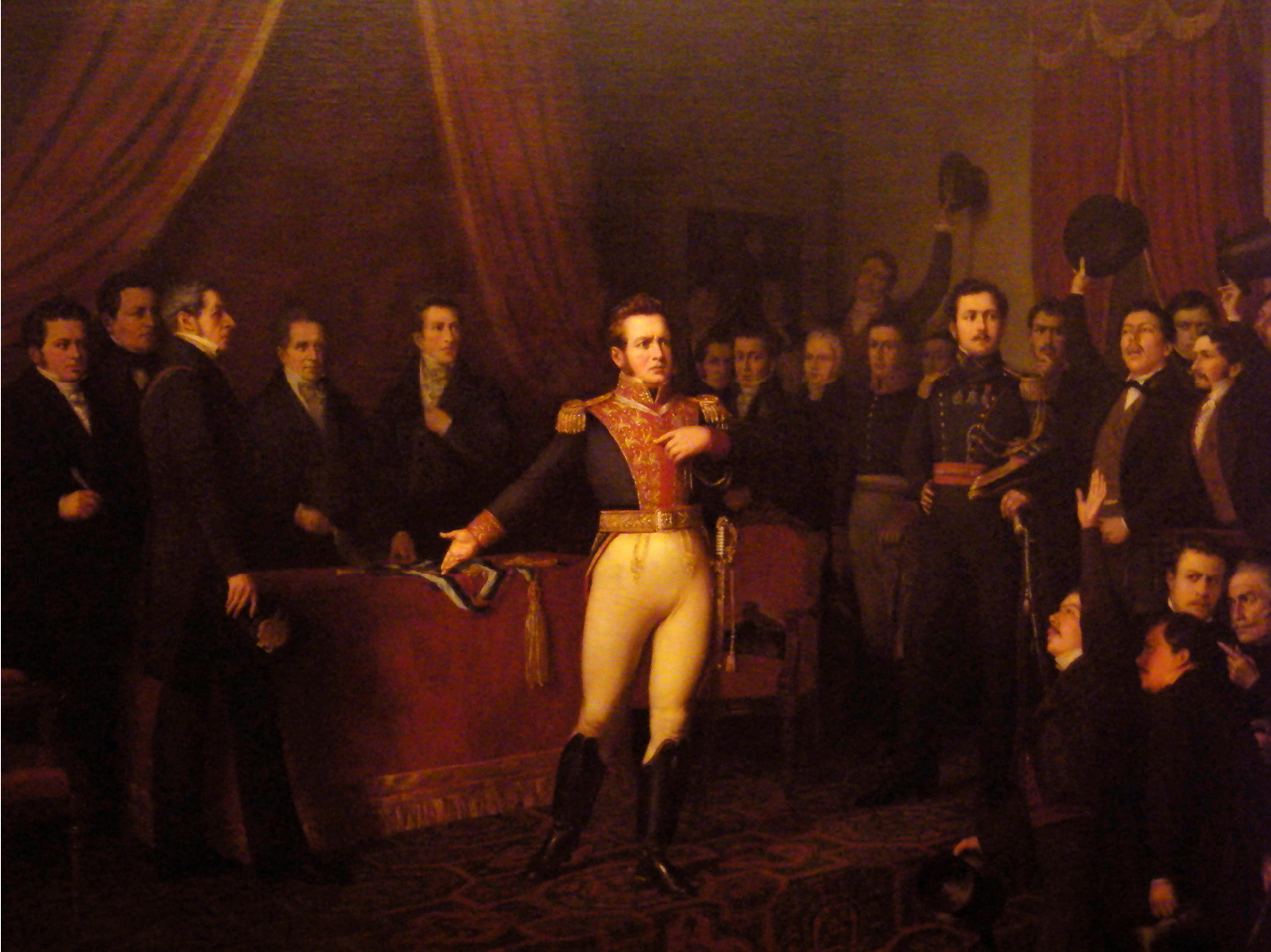
Manuel Antonio Caro (Chile) The Abdication of Bernardo O'Higgins

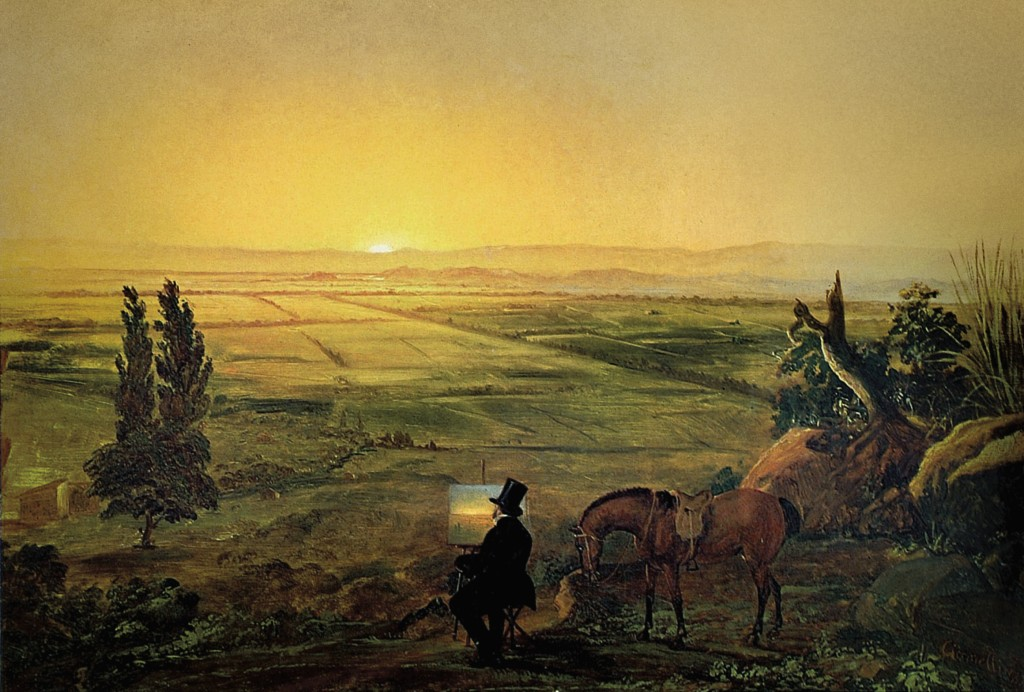
Alejandro Ciccarelli (Chile) Vista de Santiago de Chile desde Peñalolén".

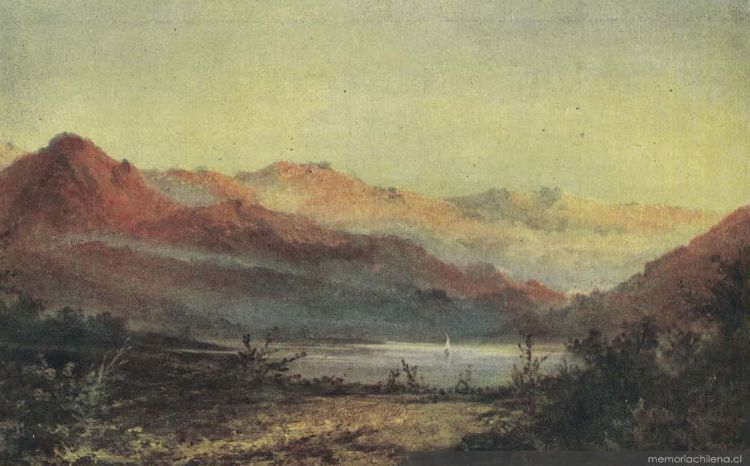
Antonio Smith (Chile) Cordillera and Lake. Late 19th c.

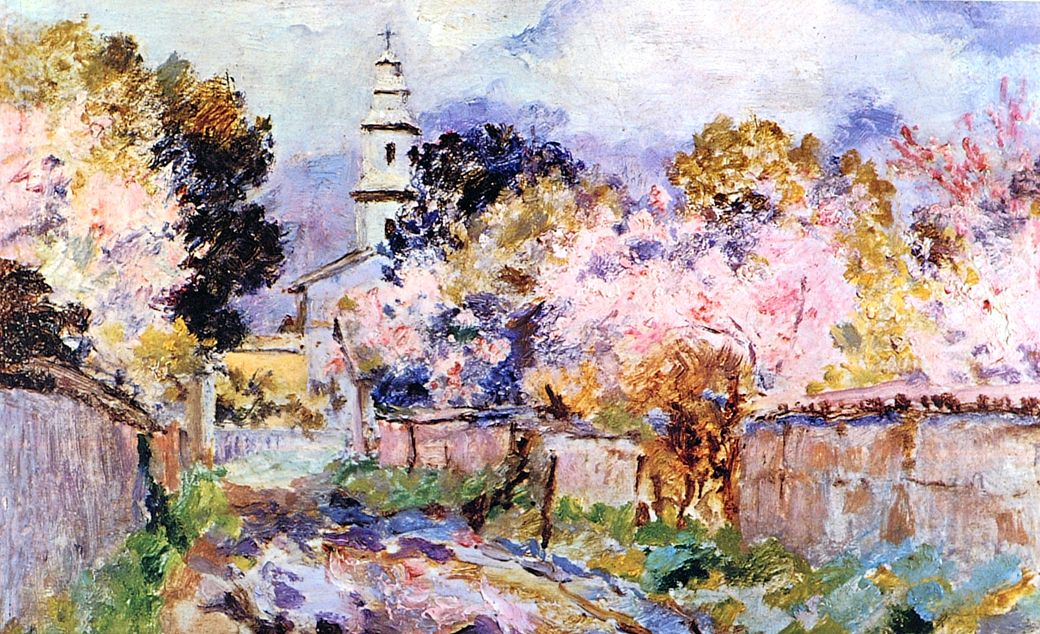
Juan Francisco González (Chile), Calle de Limache. González is considered one of Chile's greatest painters.

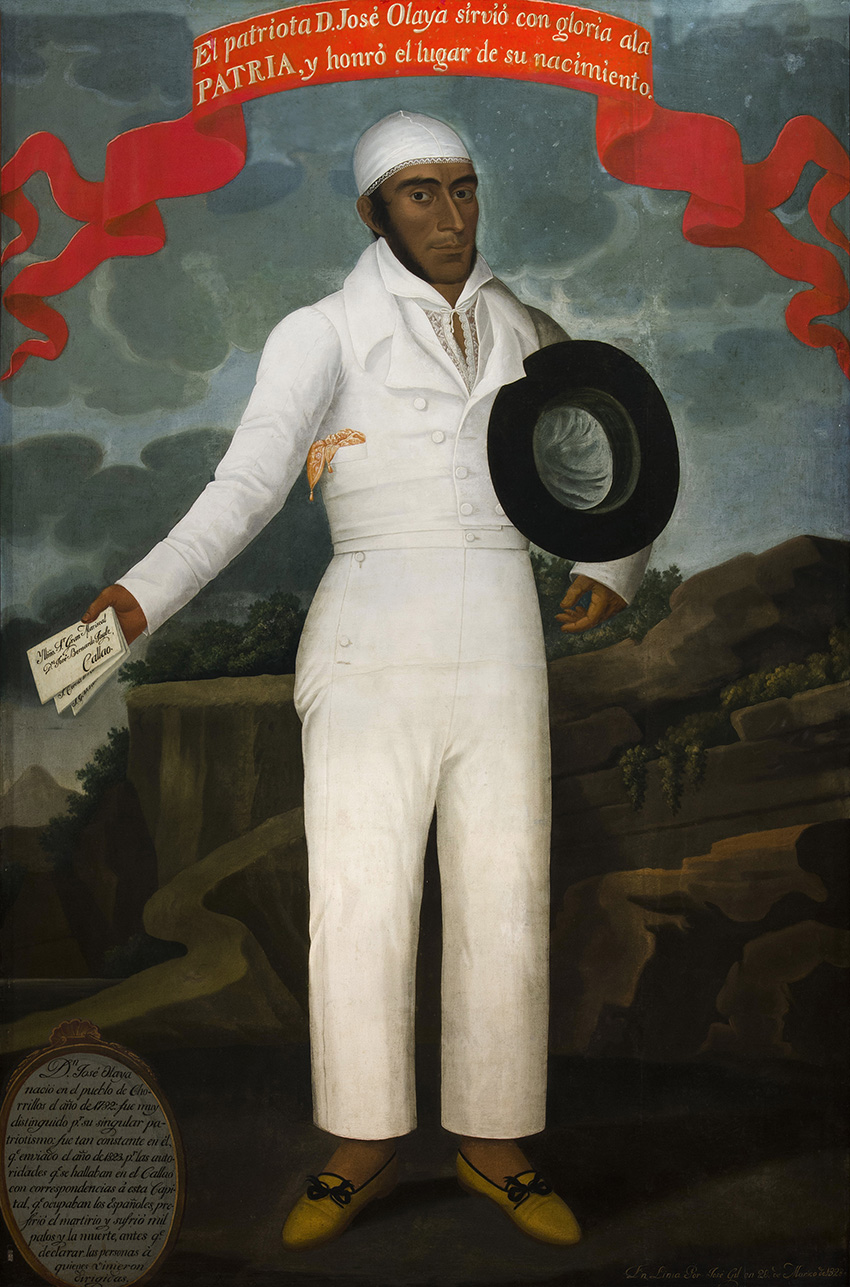
José Gil de Castro (Peru) José Olaya (1828)

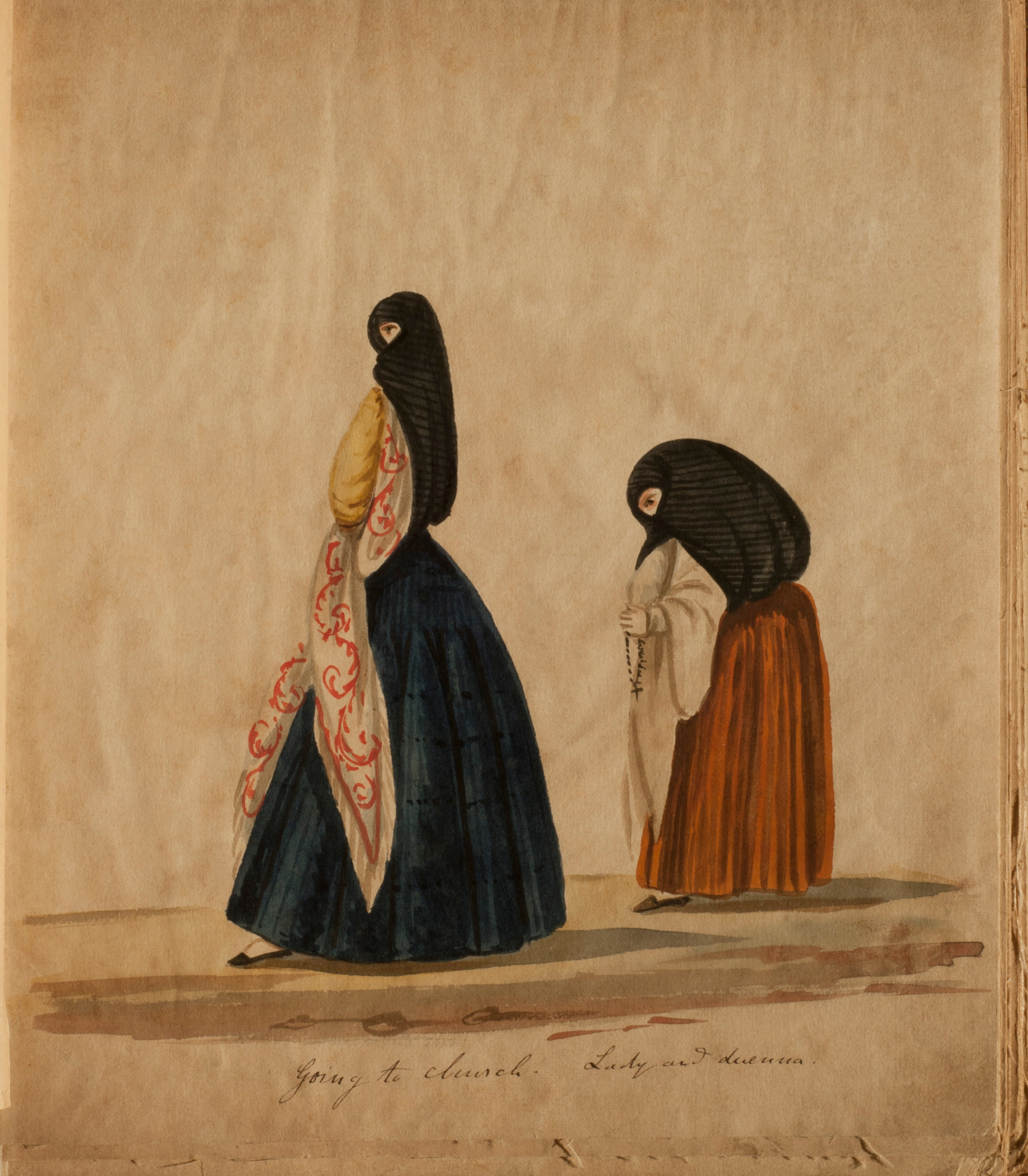
Pancho Fierro, Afro-Peruvian artist, Veiled women (tapadas) going to church

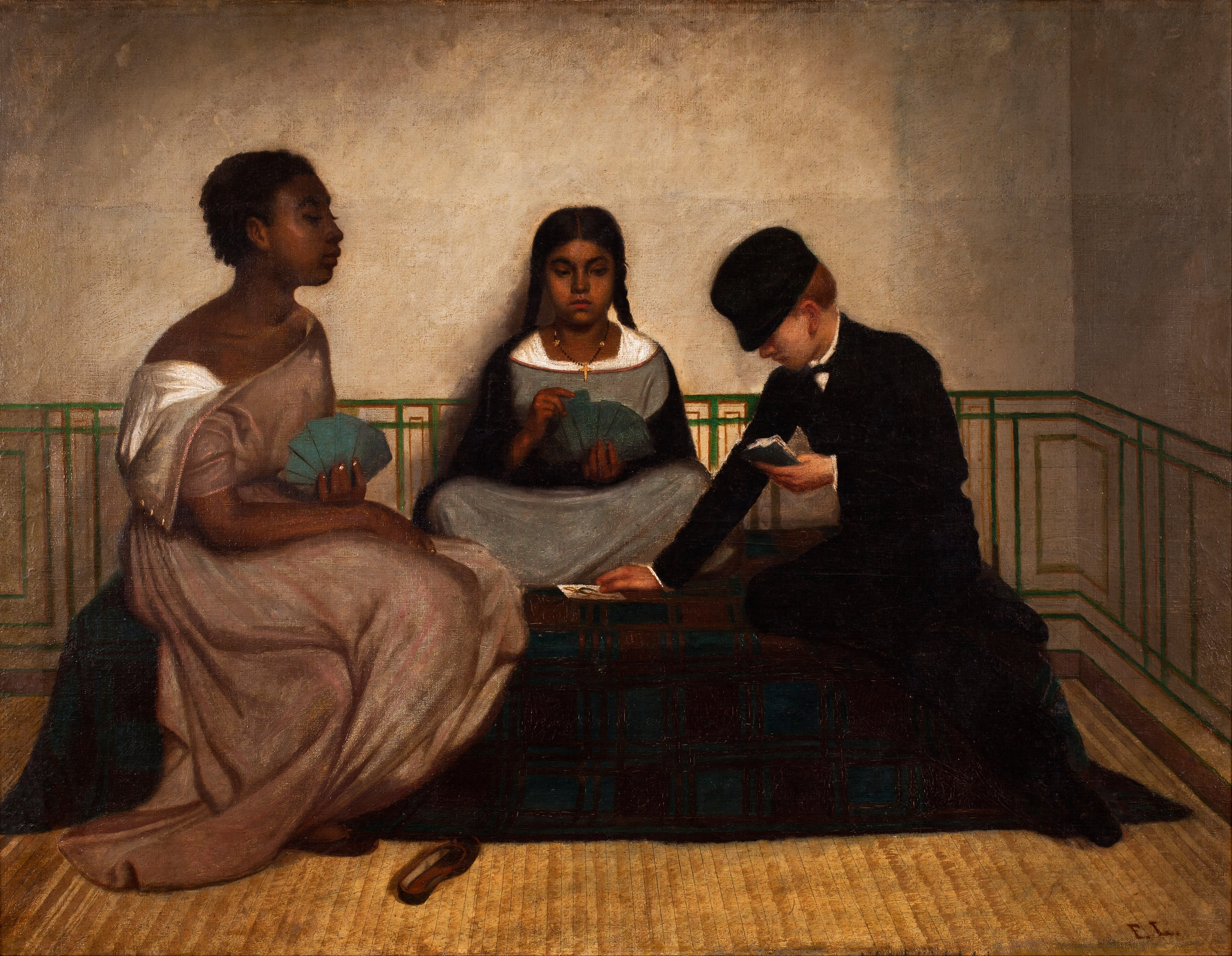
Francisco Laso (Peru) The Three Races or, Equality before the Law

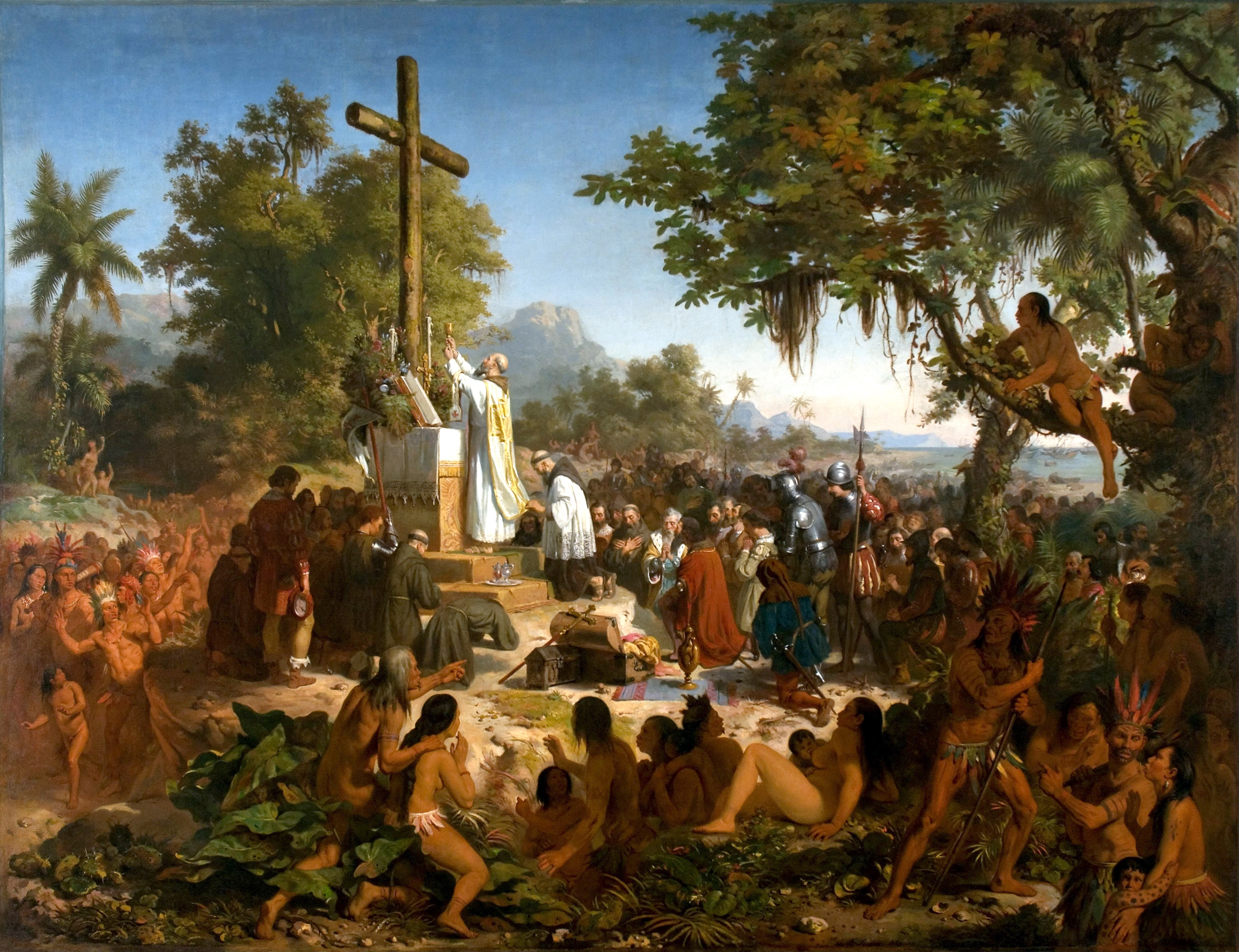
Victor Meirelles: First Mass in Brazil, 1861, Museu Nacional de Belas Artes, an example of Brazilian academic art

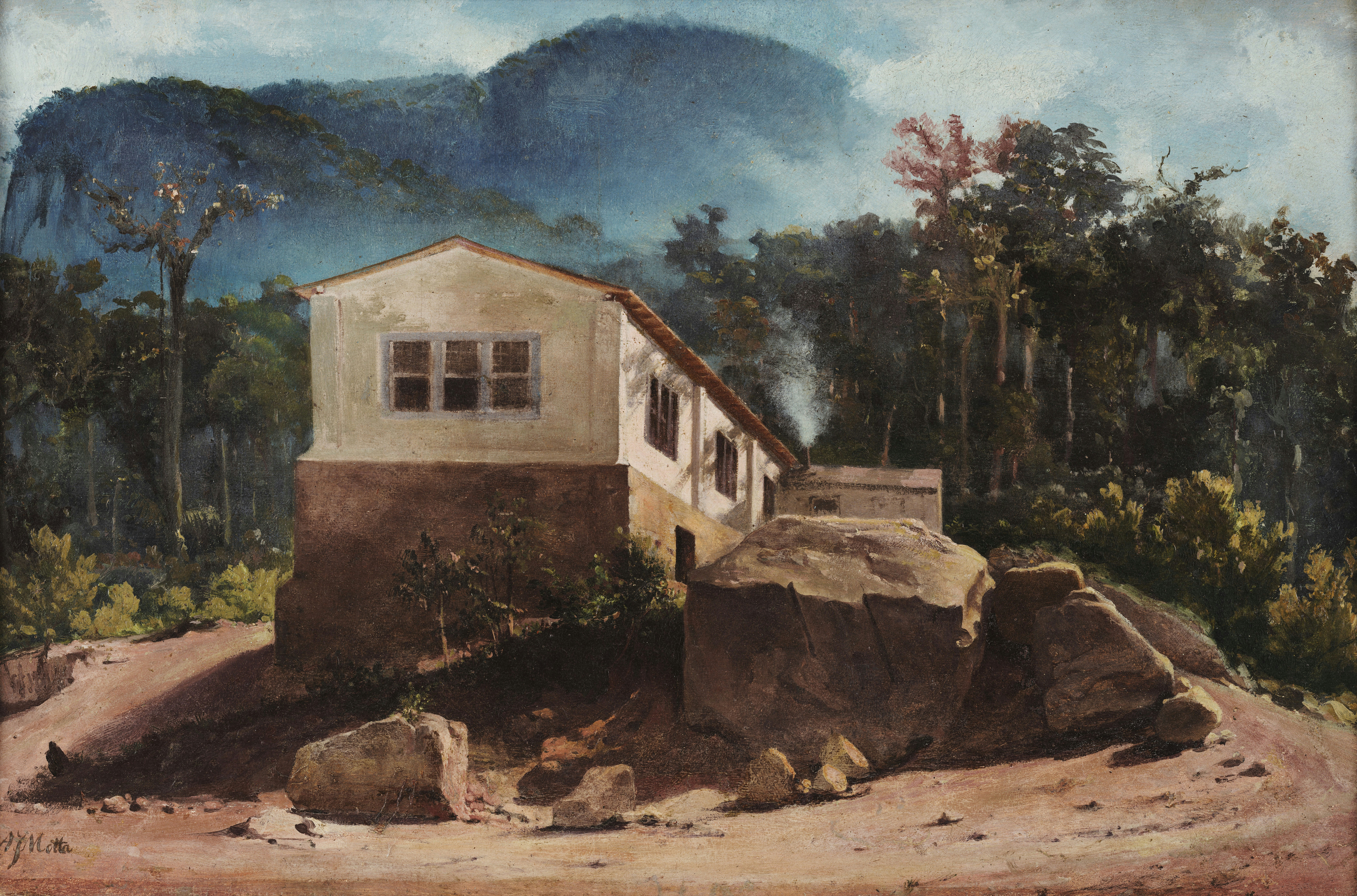
Agostinho José da Mota (Brazil) Factory at Barão de Capanema, 1862, Museu Nacional de Belas Artes

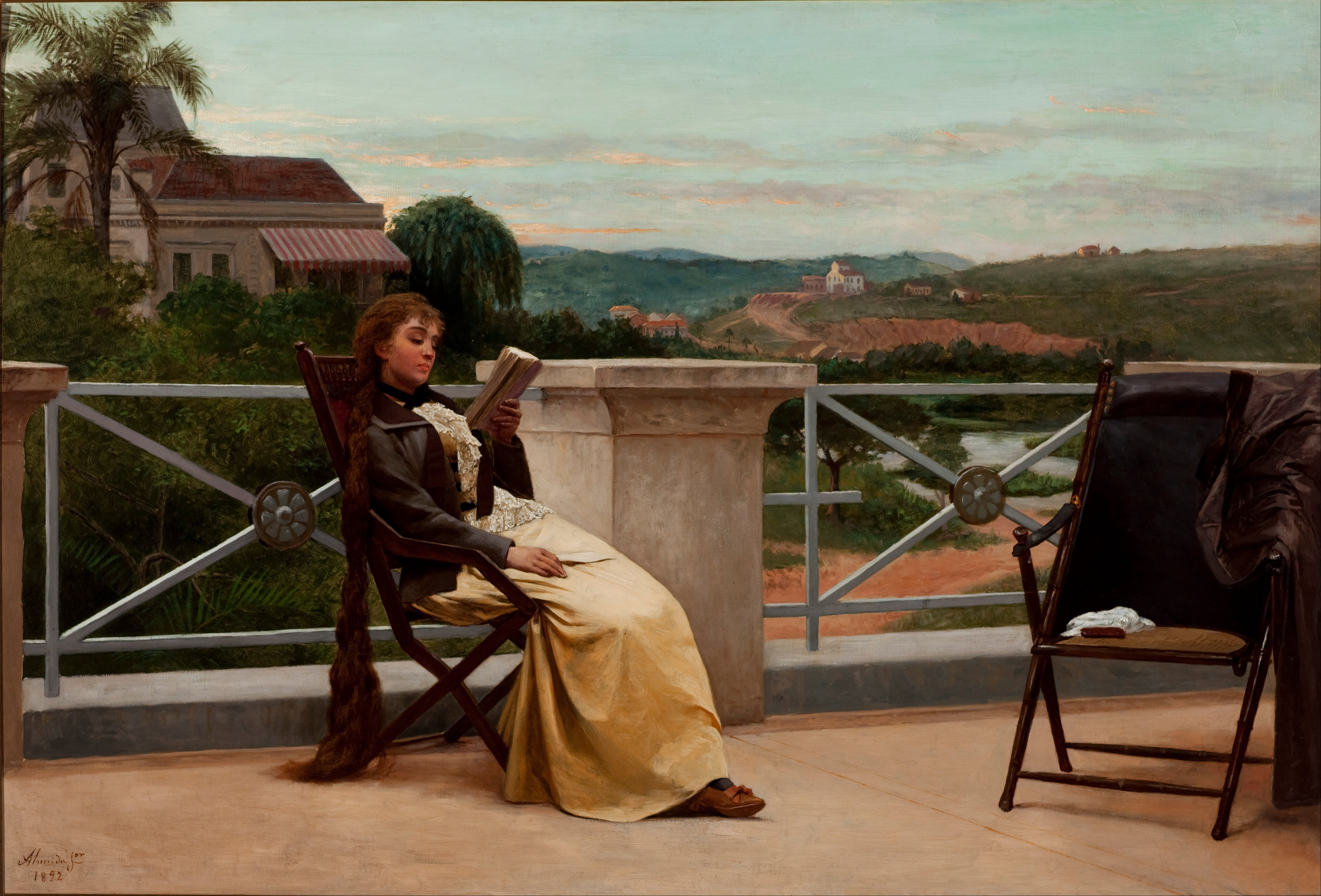
Almeida Júnior (Brazil) Reading Woman, 1892

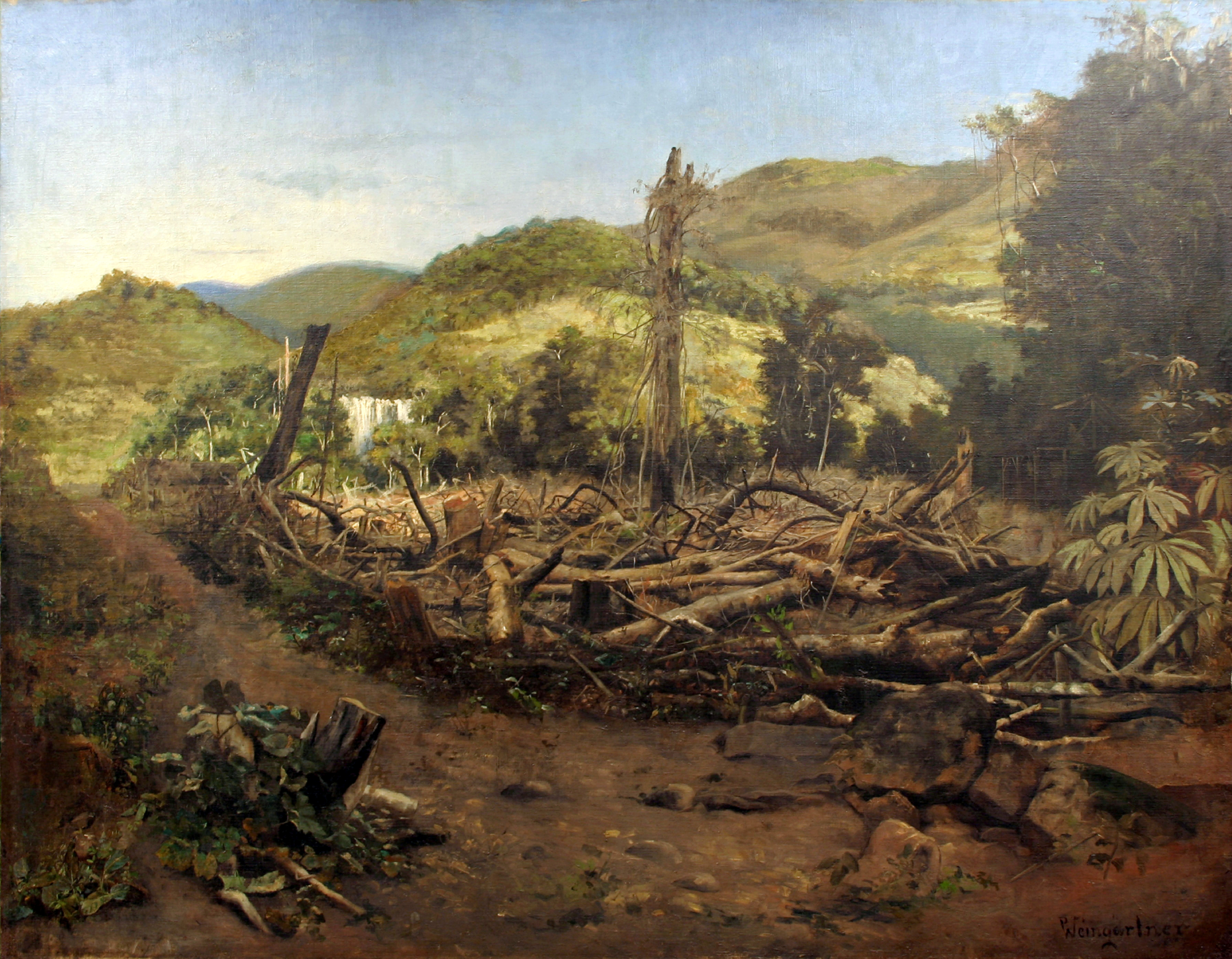
Pedro Weingartner (Brazil). After the Flood Meseu Nacional de Belas Artes, Rio de Janeiro

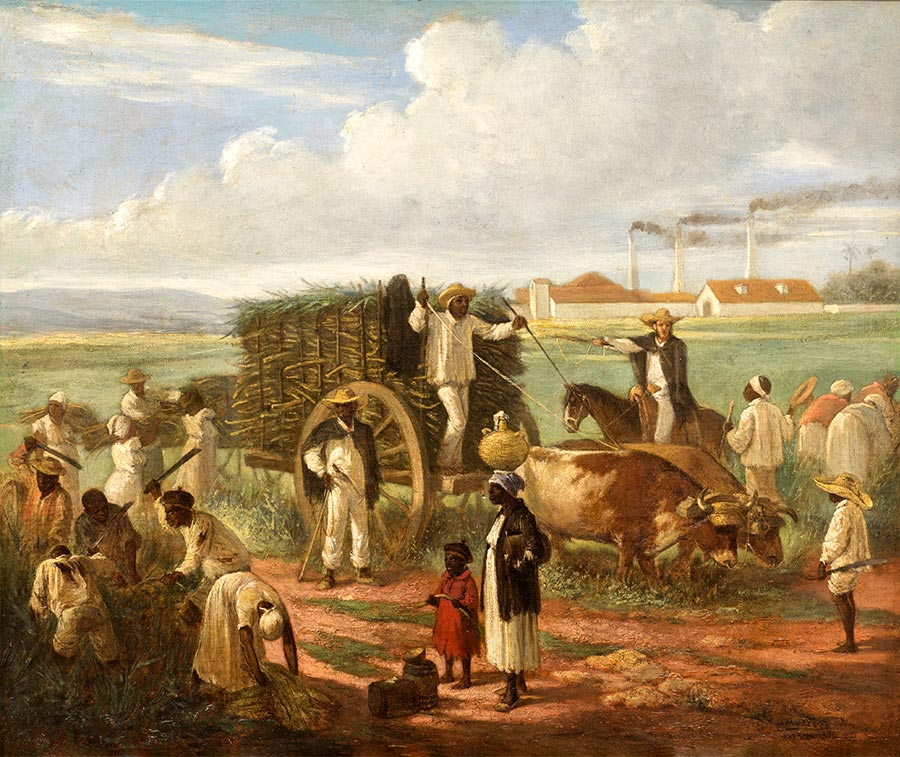
Victor Patricio de Landaluze (Cuba) Cutting Sugar Cane, 1874

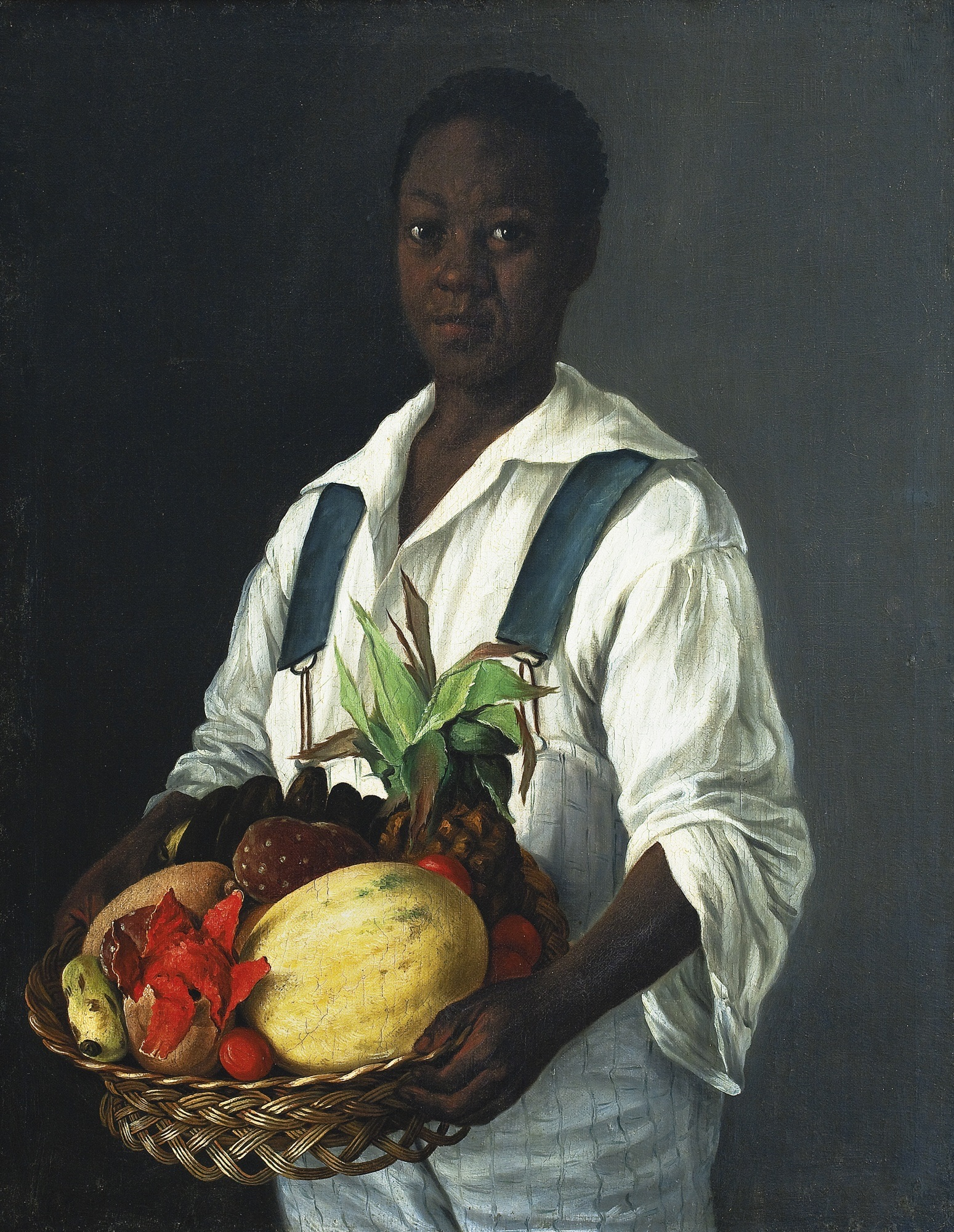
Agustín Arrieta, El Costeño. Private collection. The painting shows a boy from the coast, likely Veracruz, holding a basket of fruits including mamey, tuna and pitahaya

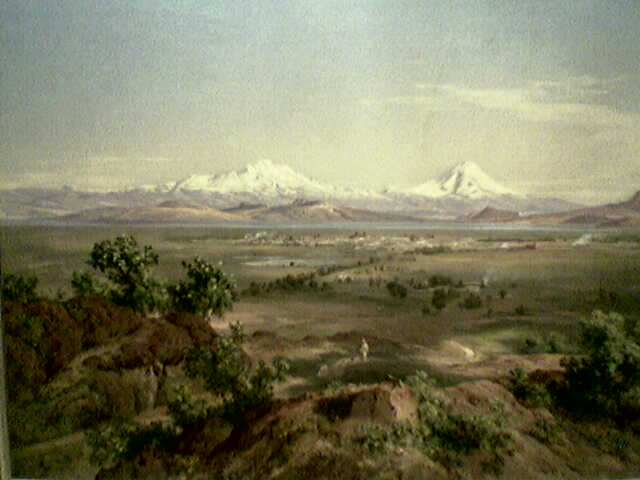
José María Velasco (Mexico) View of the Valley of Mexico

== Modernism ==
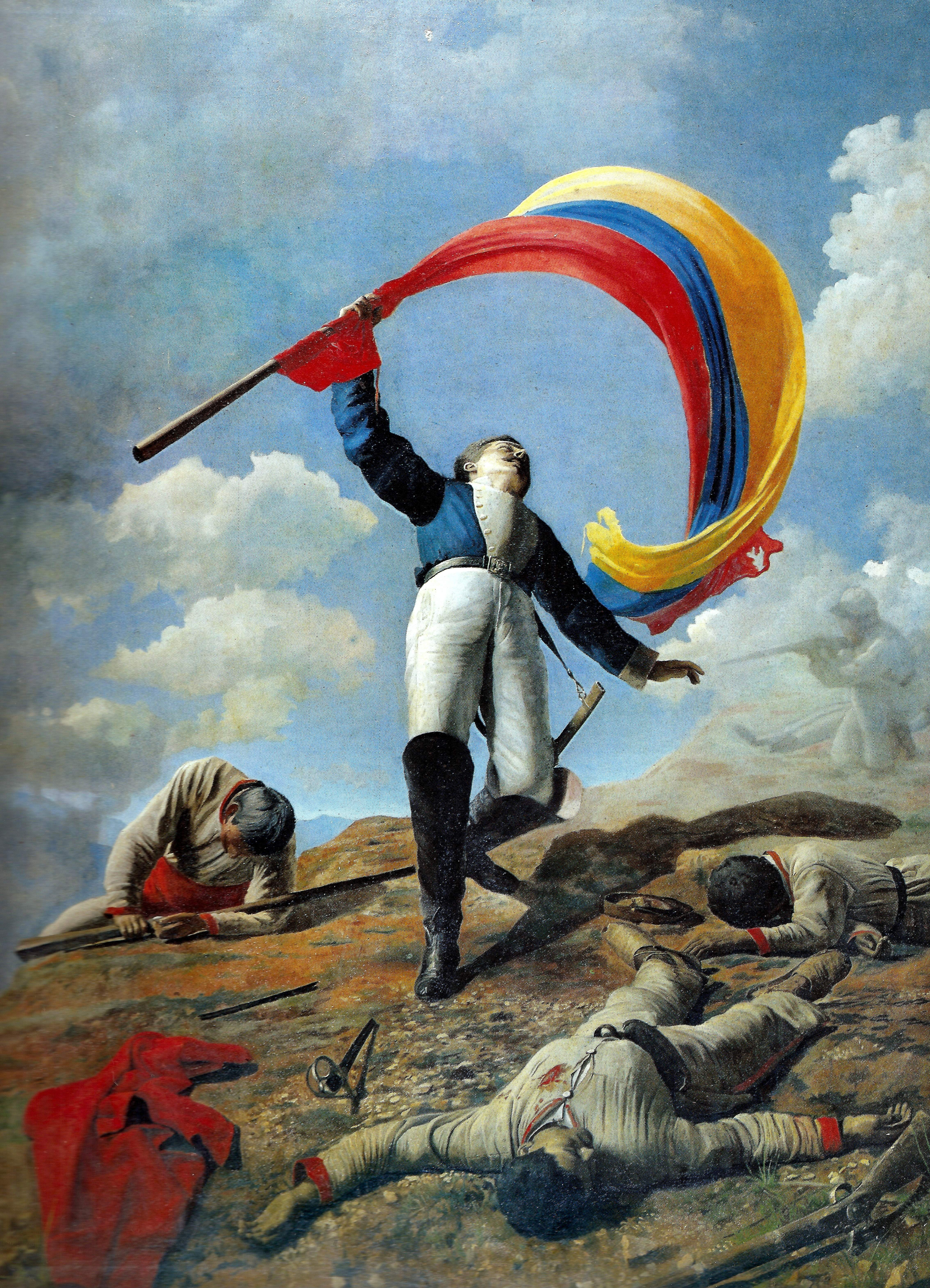
La Muerte de Girardot en Bárbula, by Venezuelan painter Cristóbal Rojas, oil, 1883

Modernism, a Western art movement typified by the rejection of traditional classical styles. This movement holds an ambivalent position in Latin American art. Not all countries developed modernized urban centers at the same time, so Modernism's appearance in Latin America is difficult to date. While Modernism was welcomed by some, others rejected it. Generally speaking, the countries of the Southern Cone were more open to foreign influence, while countries with a stronger indigenous presence such as Mexico, Peru, Ecuador, and Bolivia were resistant to European culture.

A landmark event for Modernism in the region was, the Semana de Arte Moderna or Modern Art Week, a festival that took place in São Paulo, Brazil, in 1922, marking the beginning of Brazil's Modernismo movement. "[T]hough a number of individual Brazilian artists were doing modernist work before the Week, it coalesced and defined the movement and introduced it to Brazilian society at large."

== Constructivist movement ==
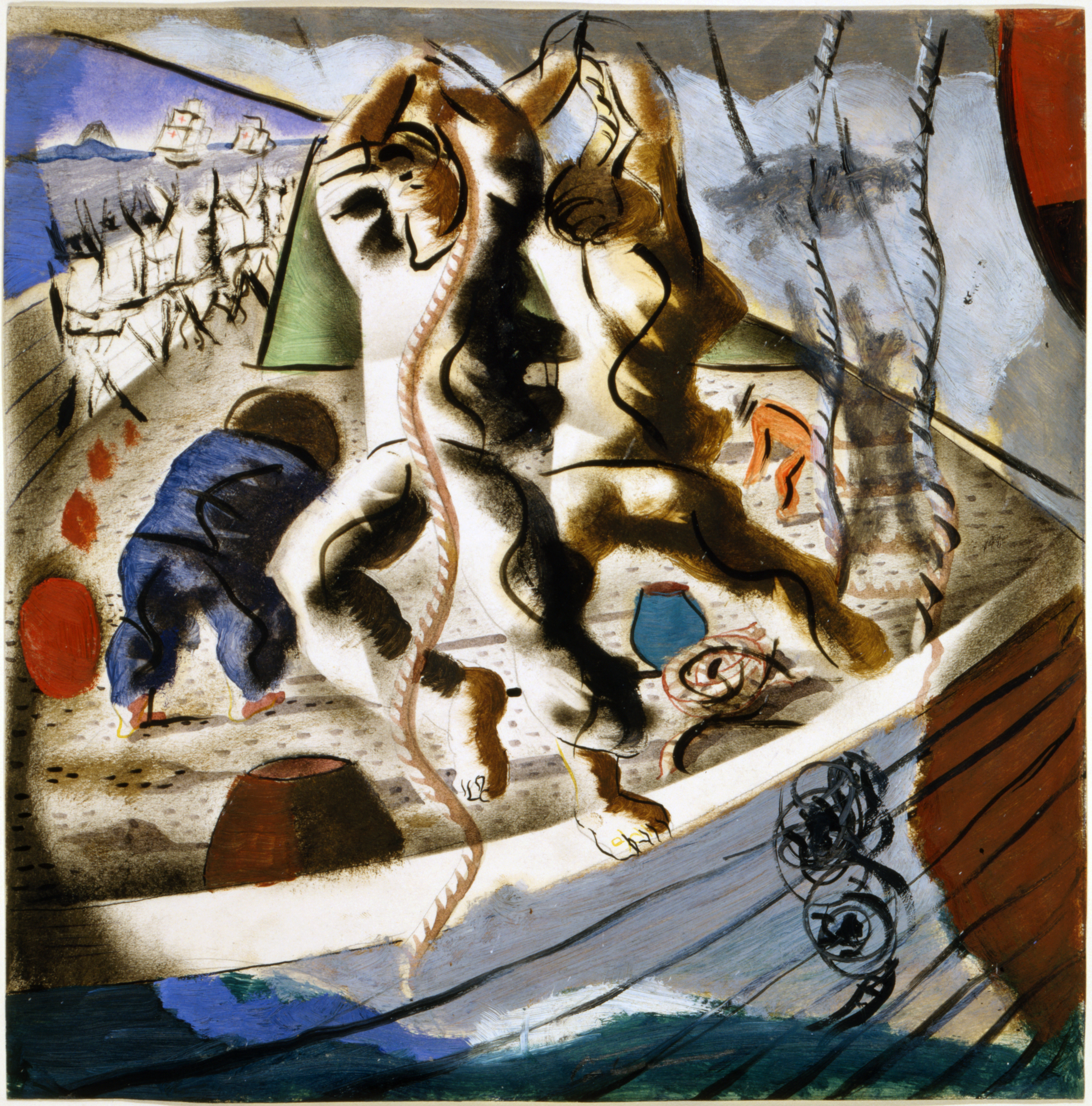
Brazilian artist Candido Portinari, Study for Discovery of the Land mural at the Library of Congress, Washington, D.C.

In general, the artistic Eurocentrism associated with the colonial period began to fade in the early twentieth century, as Latin Americans began to acknowledge their unique identity and started to follow their own path.

From the early twentieth century onward, the art of Latin America was greatly inspired by Constructivism. It quickly spread from Russia to Europe, and then into Latin America. Joaquín Torres García and Manuel Rendón have been credited with bringing the constructivism to Latin America.

After a long and successful career in Europe and the United States, Torres García returned to his native Uruguay in 1934, where he both promoted Constructivism and augmented it into a uniquely Uruguayan movement: Universal Constructivism. Attracting a circle of experienced peers and young artists as followers in Montevideo, in 1935 he founded the Asociación de Arte Constructivo as an art center and exhibition space for his circle. The venue was closed in 1940 due to a lack of funding. In 1943, he opened the Taller Torres-García, a workshop and training center that operated until 1962.

== Muralism ==
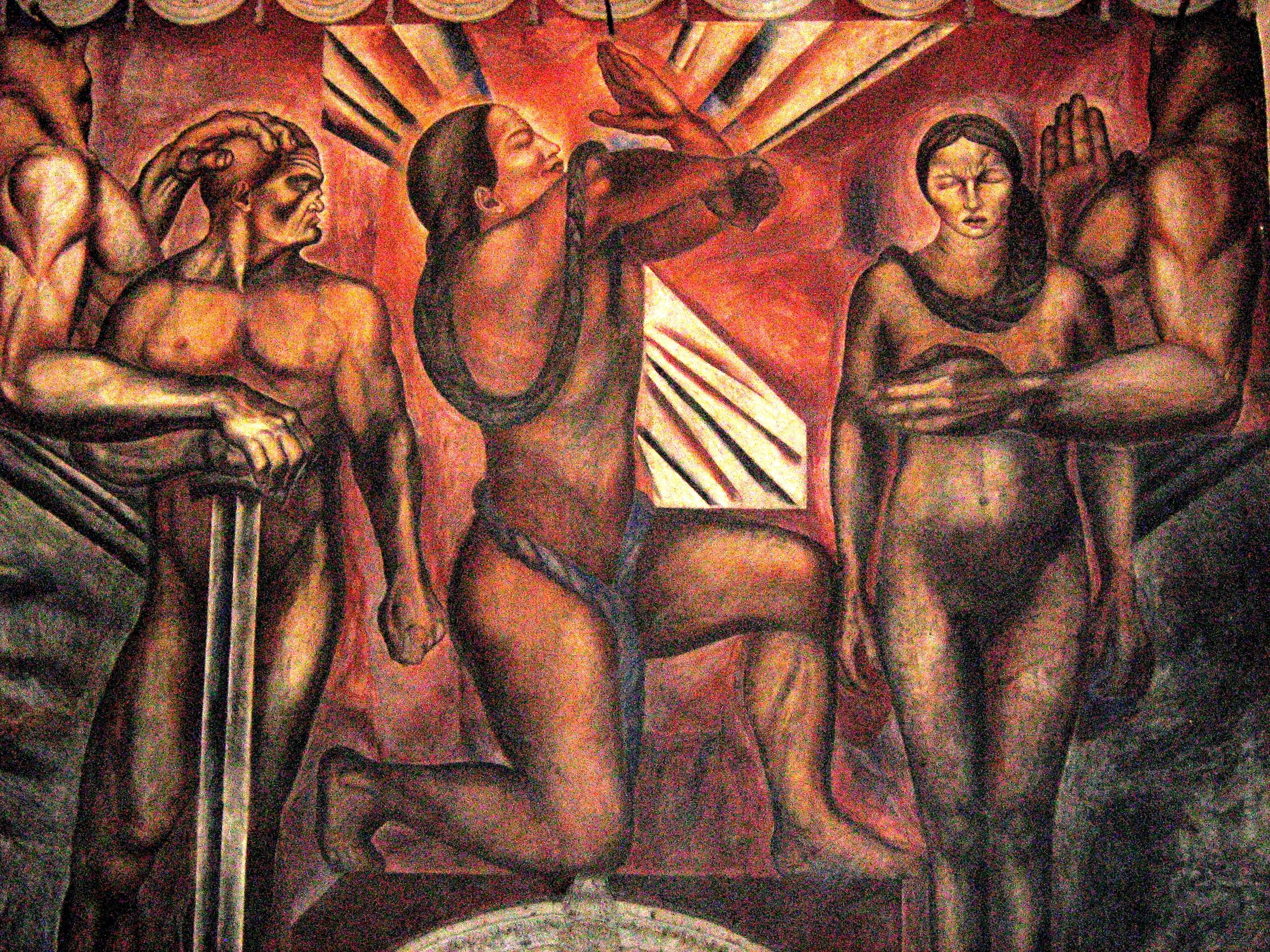
José Clemente Orozco, Mural Omniciencia, 1925

Muralism or Muralismo is an important artistic movement generated in Latin America. It is popularly represented by the Mexican muralism movement of Diego Rivera, David Alfaro Siqueiros, José Clemente Orozco, and Rufino Tamayo. In Chile, José Venturelli and Pedro Nel Gómez were influential muralists. Santiago Martinez Delgado championed muralism in Colombia, as did Gabriel Bracho in Venezuela. In the Dominican Republic, Spanish exile José Vela Zanetti was a prolific muralist, painting over 100 murals in the country. The Ecuadorian artist Oswaldo Guayasamín (a student of Orozco), the Brazilian Candido Portinari, and Bolivian Miguel Alandia Pantoja are also noteworthy. Some of the most impressive Muralista works can be found in Mexico, Colombia, New York, San Francisco, Los Angeles, Chicago and Philadelphia. Mexican Muralism "enjoyed a type of prestige and influence in other countries that no other American art movement had ever experienced." Through Muralism, artists in Latin America found a distinctive art form that provided for political and cultural expression, often focusing on issues of social justice related to their indigenous roots.

== Generación de la Ruptura ==
Generación de la Ruptura, or "Rupture Generation," (sometimes simply known as "Ruptura") is the name given to an art movement in Mexico in the 1960s in which younger artists broke away from the established national style of Muralismo. Born out of the desire of younger artists for greater freedom of style in art, this movement is marked by expressionistic and figurative styles. Mexican artist José Luis Cuevas is credited with initiating the Ruptura. In 1958, Cuevas published a paper called La Cortina del Nopal ("The Cactus Curtain"), which condemned Mexican muralism as overly political, calling it "cheap journalism and harangue" rather than art. Representative artists include José Luis Cuevas, Alberto Gironella, and Rafael Coronel.

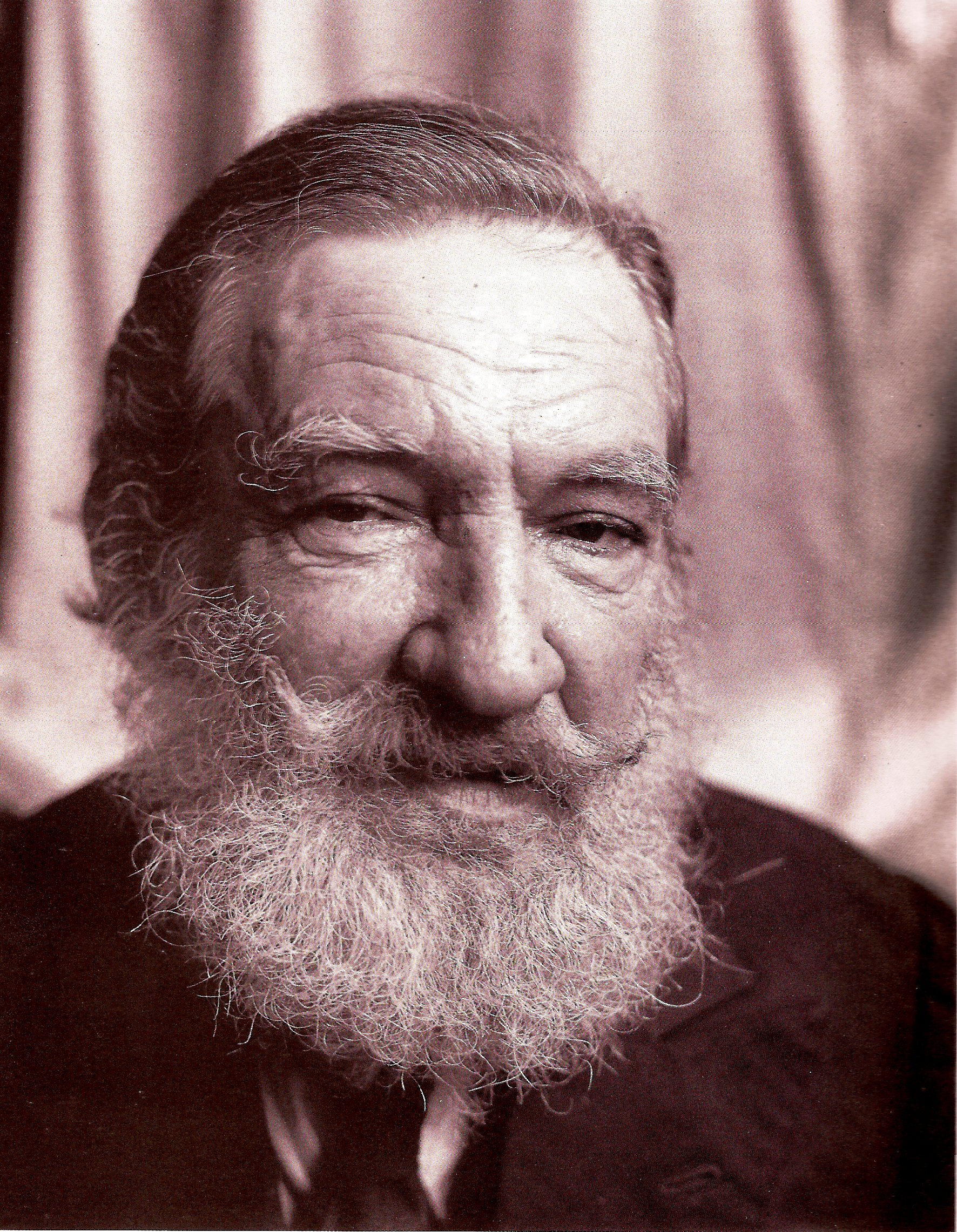
Armando Reverón is one of the most important painters of the century in Latin America

=== Nueva Presencia ===
Nueva Presencia ("new presence") was an artist group founded by artists Arnold Belkin and Francisco Icaza in the early 1960s. In response to WWII atrocities such as the Holocaust and the atomic bomb, the artists of Nueva Presencia shared an anti-aesthetic rejection of contemporary trends in art and believed that the artist had a social responsibility. Their beliefs were outlined in the Nueva Presencia manifesto, which was published in the first issue of the poster review of the same name. "No one, especially the artist, has the right to be indifferent to the social order." Members of the group included Francisco Corzas (b. 1936), Emilio Ortiz (b. 1936), Leonel Góngora (b.1933), Artemio Sepúlveda (b. 1936), and José Muñoz, and photographer Ignacio "Nacho" López.

== Surrealism ==
The French poet and founder of Surrealism, André Breton, after visiting Mexico in 1938, proclaimed it to be "the surrealist country par excellence." Surrealism, an artistic movement originating in post-World War I Europe, strongly impacted the art of Latin America. This is where the Mestizo culture, the legacy of European conquer over indigenous peoples, embodies contradiction, a central value of Surrealism.

The widely known Mexican painter Frida Kahlo painted self-portraits and depictions of traditional Mexican culture in a style that combines Realism, Symbolism and Surrealism. Although, Kahlo did not commend this label, once saying, "They thought I was a Surrealist, but I wasn't. I never painted dreams. I painted my own reality." Kahlo's work commands the highest selling price of all Latin American paintings, and the second-highest for any female artist. Other female Mexican Surrealists include Leonora Carrington (a British woman who relocated to Mexico) and Remedios Varo (a Spanish exile). Mexican artist Alberto Gironella, Chilean artists Roberto Matta, Mario Carreño Morales, and Nemesio Antúnez, Cuban artist Wifredo Lam, and Argentine artist Roberto Aizenberg have also been classified as Surrealists.

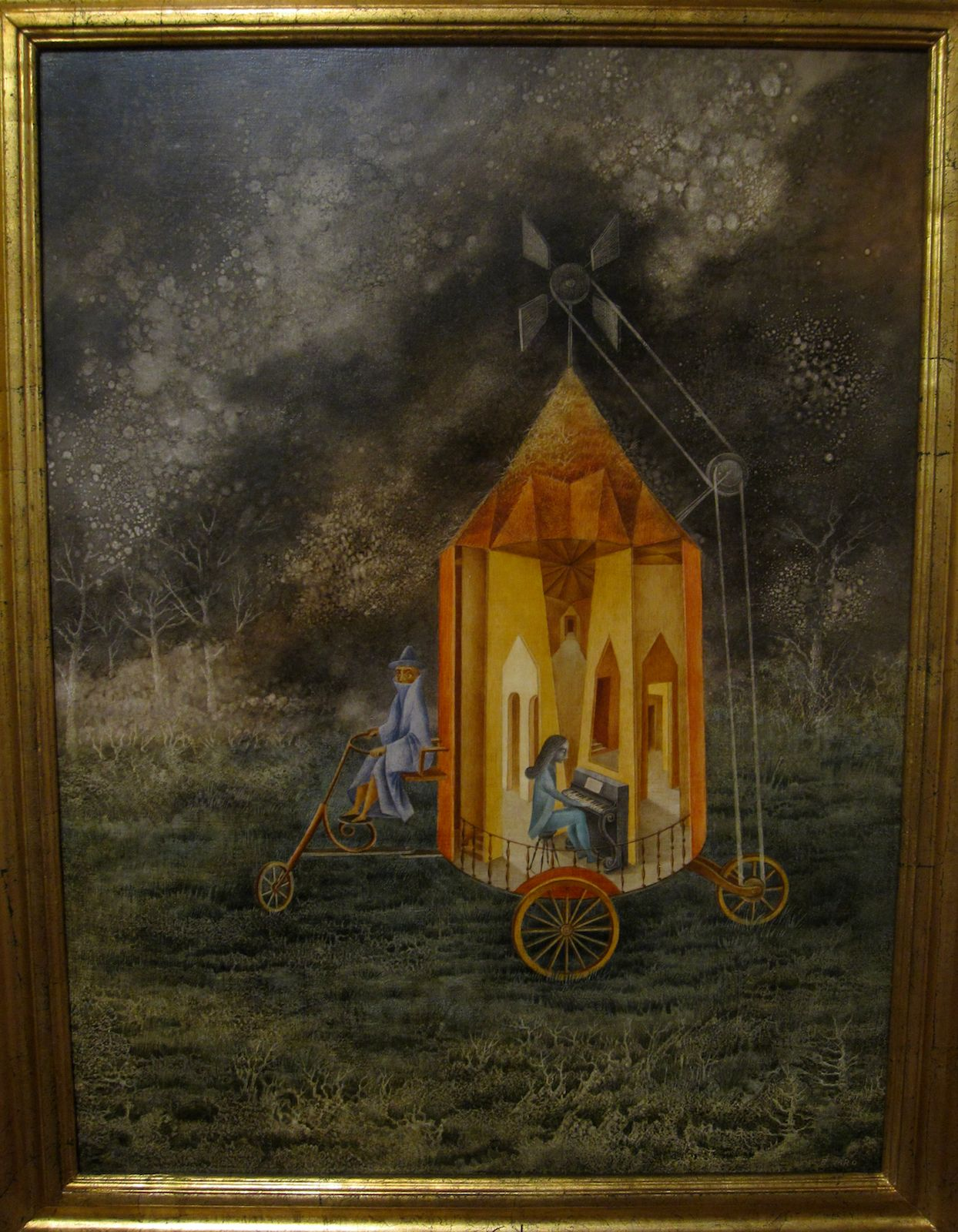
Remedios Varo (Mexico) Roulotte, 1956

== Contemporary art ==
Since roughly the 1970s, artists from all parts of Latin America have made important contributions to international contemporary art, from conceptual sculptors like Doris Salcedo (from Colombia) and Daniel Lind-Ramos (from Puerto Rico), to painters like Myrna Báez (from Puerto Rico), to artists working in media like photography, such as Vik Muniz (from Brazil).

In Mexico, printmaking has served as a medium for political expression and social movements since the early 20th century. Following the 2006 uprising in Oaxaca, politically engaged collectives including ASARO, Colectivo Subterráneos, and Lapiztola formed to address contemporary issues through relief printmaking and public muralism.

== Styles and trends ==
=== Figuration ===
European classical art styles have made a long-lasting impression on the art of Latin America. Into the twentieth century, many Latin American artists continued to be schooled in the traditional 19th-century style, resulting in a continued emphasis on figurative work. Due to the far reach of figuration, the work often spans upon a number of different styles such as Realism, Pop art, Expressionism, and Surrealism, only naming a few. While these artists confront issues that range from the personal to the political, many have a shared interest in indigenous issues and the heritage of European cultural imperialism.

One movement devoted to figuration was Otra Figuración (Other Figuration), an Argentine artist group and commune formed in 1961 and disbanded in 1966. Members Rómulo Macció, Ernesto Deira, Jorge de la Vega, and Luis Felipe Noé lived together and shared a studio in Buenos Aires. Artists of Otra Figuración worked in an expressionistic abstract figurative style featuring vivid colors and collage. Although Otra Figuración were contemporaries of Nueva Presencia, there was no direct contact between the two groups. People who are sometimes associated with the group are Raquel Forner, Antonio Berni, Alberto Heredia, and Antonio Seguí.

=== Parody and sociopolitical critique ===
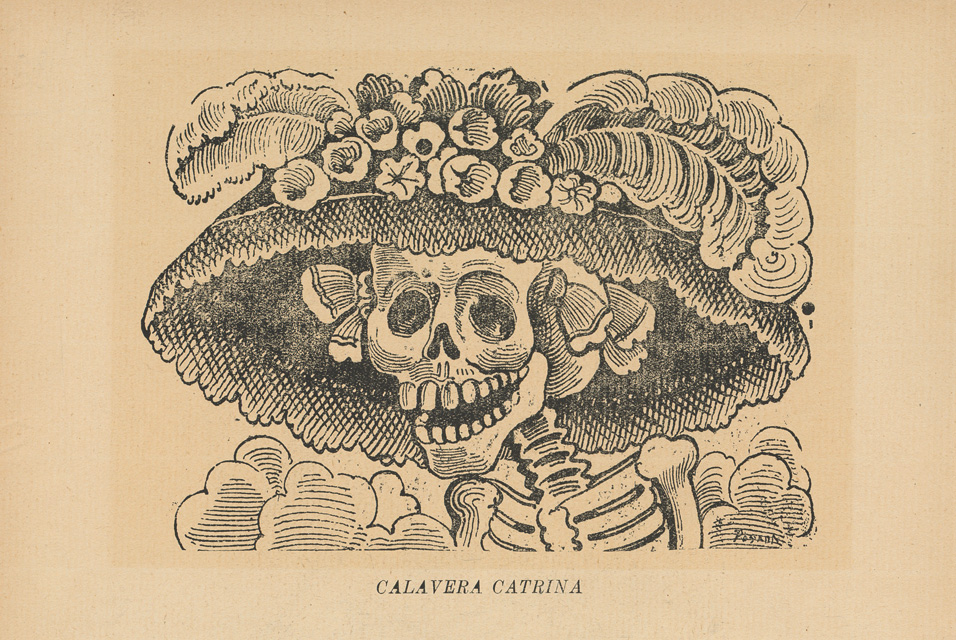
José Guadalupe Posada (Mexico) La Calavera Catrina

Art in Latin America has often been used as a means of social and political critique. Mexican graphic artist José Guadalupe Posada drew harsh images of Mexican elites as skeletons, calaveras. This was done prior to the Mexican Revolution, strongly influencing later artists, such as Diego Rivera. A common practice among Latin American figurative artists is to parody Old Master paintings, especially those of the Spanish court produced by Diego Velázquez in the 17th century. These parodies serve a dual purpose, referring to the artistic and cultural history of Latin America, and critiquing the legacy of European cultural imperialism in Latin American nations. Artists Fernando Botero, Herman Braun-Vega and Alberto Gironella frequently employed this technique.

Colombian figurative artist Fernando Botero, whose work features unique "puffy" figures in various situations addressing themes of power, war, and social issues, has used this technique to draw parallels between current governing bodies and the Spanish monarchy. His 1967 painting The Presidential Family, is an early example. The painting, echoing Diego Velázquez's 1656 Spanish court painting Las Meninas (The Maids of Honor), contains a self-portrait of Botero standing behind a large canvas. The thick, "puffy" presidential family, decked out in fashionable finery and staring blandly out of the canvas, appear socially superior, drawing attention to social inequality. According to Botero, his "puffy" figures are not meant to be satirical. He painted a powerful series of canvases, which are based on photos of torture by the U.S. military of Iraqi prisoners at Abu Ghraib prison.

The deformation you see is the result of my involvement with painting. The monumental and, in my eyes, sensually provocative volumes stem from this. Whether they appear fat or not does not interest me. It has hardly any meaning for my painting. My concern is with formal fullness, abundance. And that is something entirely different.

Among Peruvian painter Herman Braun-Vega, the appropriation of works of the old masters is almost systematic from the 1970s. The characters he borrows from the iconography of European painting are often confronted with the social and political situation of Latin America. In his painting La leçon... à la campagne (Rembrandt) in 1984, he takes the scene from Rembrandt’s painting The Anatomy Lesson of Dr. Nicolaes Tulp, transporting it outside to the countryside and substituting for certain characters from the original painting, contemporary Latin American characters who refer to the social and political situation of South America as confirmed by the texts of the press clippings transfers of the newspaper Le Monde which structures the feet of the corpse in the cubist way. In 1987, in his painting Double focus over the West (Velazquez and Picasso), he turned Velazquez's painting Las Meninas into a critic of the power of the Church by replacing the royal couple in the mirror of the back of the room by Pope John Paul II receiving Kurt Waldheim in the Vatican. Among many other examples, we can still cite the painting Los caprichos del F.M.I. (Goya) of 2003 where El Tiempo y las viejas and some engravings from Los caprichos de Goya are featured to criticize the sermonizers of the International Monetary Fund.

Mexican painter and collagist Alberto Gironella, whose style mixes elements of Surrealism and Pop art, also produced parodies of official Spanish court paintings. He completed dozens of versions of Velásquez's Queen Mariana from 1652. Gironella's parodies critique the Spanish rule of Mexico by incorporating subversive imagery. ‘’La Reina de los Yugos’’ or "The Queen of Yokes" (1975–81) depicts Mariana with a skirt made of upside-down ox yokes, signifying both Spanish dominance over Mexico's indigenous peoples, and those people's subversion of Spanish rule. The yokes are rendered useless by being upturned. "[Gironella's] hallmark was the use of particular Spanish Grocery cans (sardines, mussels, etc.) in his works, and soda bottle caps nailed or glued around the rim of his paintings."

Cuban artist Sandra Ramos' paintings, etchings, installations, collages, and digital animation often tackle taboo subjects in contemporary Cuban society such as racism, mass migration, communism and social injustices in contemporary Cuban society.

== Photography ==
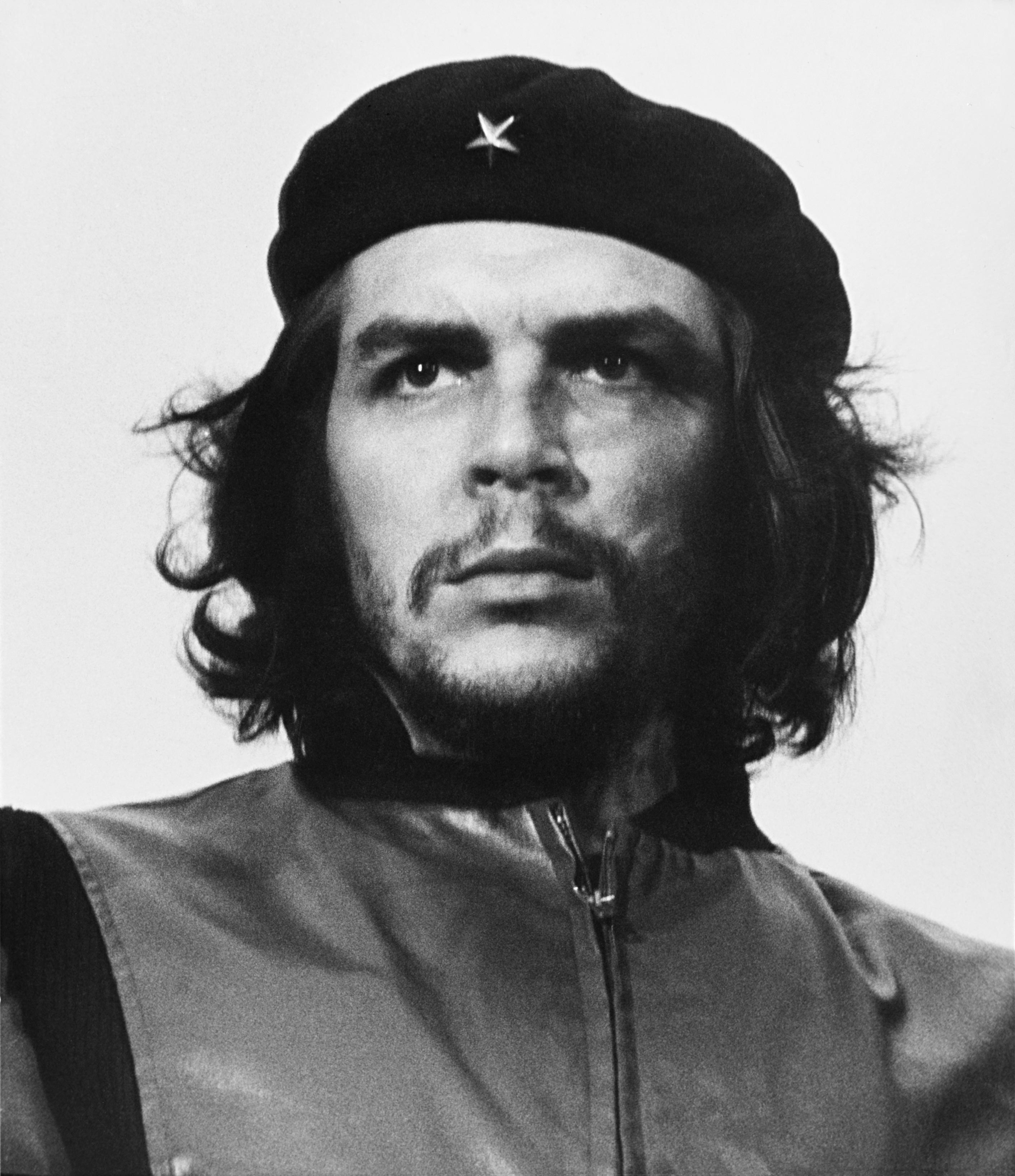
Guerrillero Heroico Picture taken of Che Guevara by Alberto Korda on March 5, 1960, at the La Coubre memorial service.

Photographers captured on film, indigenous peoples as well as distinct social types, such as the gauchos of Argentina. A number of Latin Americans have made significant contributions to modern photography. Guy Veloso and José Bassit photograph the Brazilian religiosity. Guillermo Kahlo photographed Mexican colonial buildings and infrastructure, such as the railway bridge at Metlac. Agustín Casasola himself took many images of the Mexican Revolution, and compiled an extensive archive of Mexican photos. Other photographers include indigenous Peruvian Martín Chambi, Mexican Graciela Iturbide, and Cuban Alberto Korda, famous for his iconic image of Che Guevara. Mario Testino is a noted Peruvian fashion photographer. In addition, a number of non-Latin American photographers have focused on the area, including Tina Modotti and Edward Weston in Mexico. Guatemalan national María Cristina Orive has worked in Argentina with Sara Facio. Ecuadoran Hugo Cifuentes has garnered attention.

=== Gallery ===
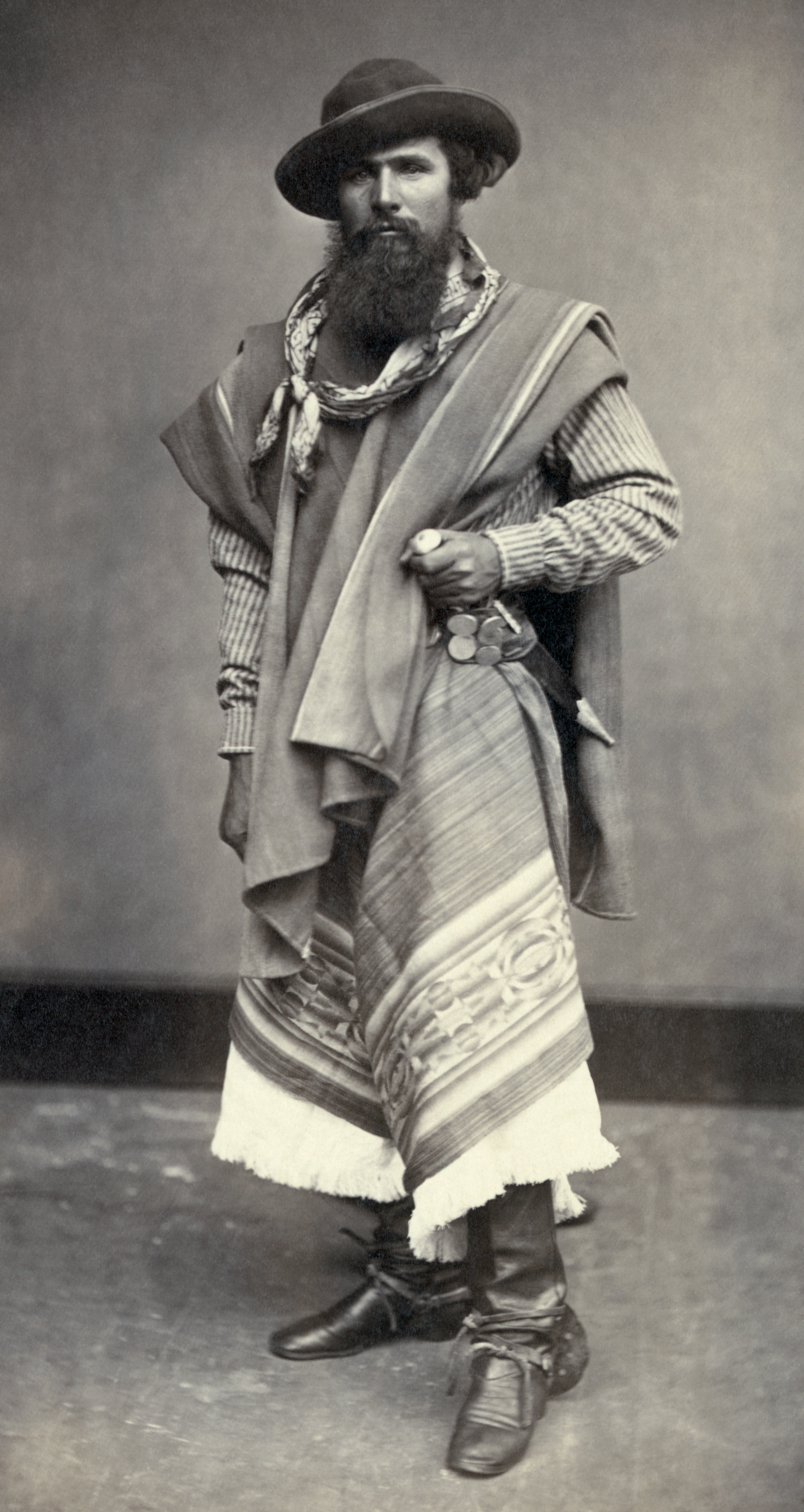
Photo of an Argentine gaucho. Courret Hermanos Fotogs., Lima, Peru (1868)

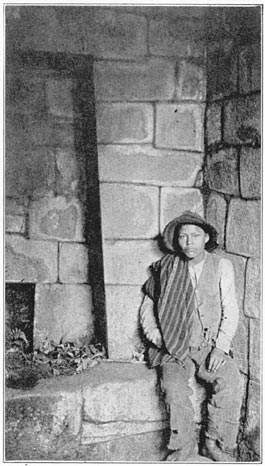
Martín Chambi (Peru) photo of a man at Machu Picchu, published in Inca Land. Explorations in the Highlands of Peru, 1922

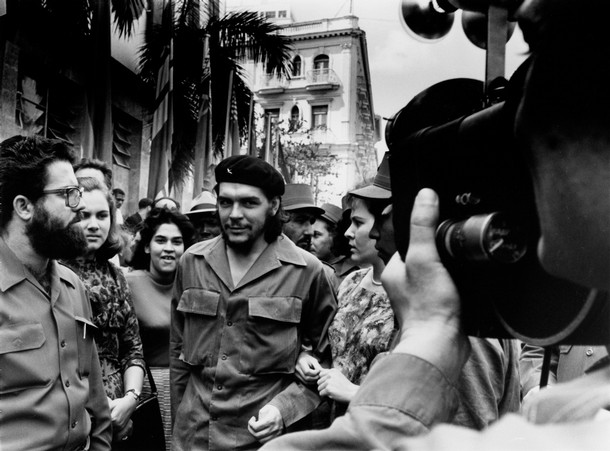
Alberto Korda taking a picture of Che Guevara, with arms linked to his wife Aleida March.

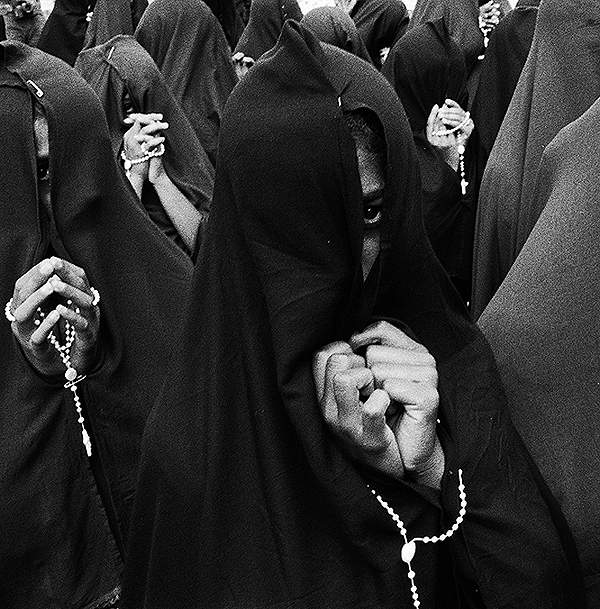
Guy Veloso. Brazilian Penitents, 2002. Gelatin silver print

== See also ==
- Argentine art
- Bolivian art
- Brazilian art
- Chilean art
- Colombian art
- Costa Rican art
- Cuban art
- Dominican art
- Ecuadorian art
- Guatemalan art
- Honduran art
- Mexican art
- Nicaraguan art
- Panamanian art
- Paraguayan art
- Peruvian art
- Puerto Rican art
- Salvadoran art
- Uruguayan art
- Venezuelan art
- List of Latin American artists
- Latin American culture
- Mexican Muralism
- Chilote School of Religious Imagery
- Indochristian art
- Paraguayan Indian art
- Pre-Columbian art
- Visual arts by indigenous peoples of South America
