= 1886 in art =

Events from the year 1886 in art.

== Events ==
- c. March 1 – Vincent van Gogh moves to Paris to stay with his brother Theo.
- March 16 – It is announced in the House of Commons of the United Kingdom to acclamation that John Constable's painting The Hay Wain (1821) has been presented to the National Gallery in London by collector Henry Vaughan and hung there today.
- April 12 – New English Art Club opens its first exhibition, at the Egyptian Hall, London, to the public, providing an alternative to the Royal Academy for younger artists, such as Philip Wilson Steer, under the influence of Paris.
- April 28 – Paul Cézanne marries his model and former lover Marie-Hortense Fiquet, despite having publicly stated that he has no feelings for her.
- May 15–June 15 – Eighth and last collective Impressionist exhibition in Paris at 1 rue Laffitte introduces Georges Seurat's A Sunday Afternoon on the Island of La Grande Jatte among other early examples of pontillism exhibited separately and includes a group of Degas nudes.
- June 30 – Royal Holloway College for women, established by patent medicine manufacturer Thomas Holloway (died 1883), opened by Queen Victoria at Egham in Surrey, England, incorporating a picture gallery for which the founder has acquired a collection of predominantly modern British works; this is the first art gallery in Britain intended primarily for viewing by women.
- July – Paul Gauguin joins the Pont-Aven School of artists for the summer.
- August 21–September 21 – Second exhibition by the Société des Artistes Indépendants in Paris. Henri Rousseau exhibits for the first time and Seurat's A Sunday Afternoon on the Island of La Grande Jatte causes the critic Félix Fénéon to describe the technique of pointillism and chromoluminarist style being developed by Seurat and Paul Signac as neo-impressionism.
- October 28 – Dedication of Frédéric Auguste Bartholdi's Statue of Liberty in New York Harbor.
- P. H. Emerson publishes his first photographic book, Life and Landscape on the Norfolk Broads.
- Publication in French of Irish-born writer George Moore's autobiographical novel Confessions of a Young Man describing bohemian life in 1870s Paris among the Impressionists.
- Publication of Émile Zola's novel L'Œuvre based on his friendship with Paul Cézanne.

== Awards ==
- Prix de Rome (painting) – Charles Lebayle, Claudius Proclaimed Emperor

== Works ==
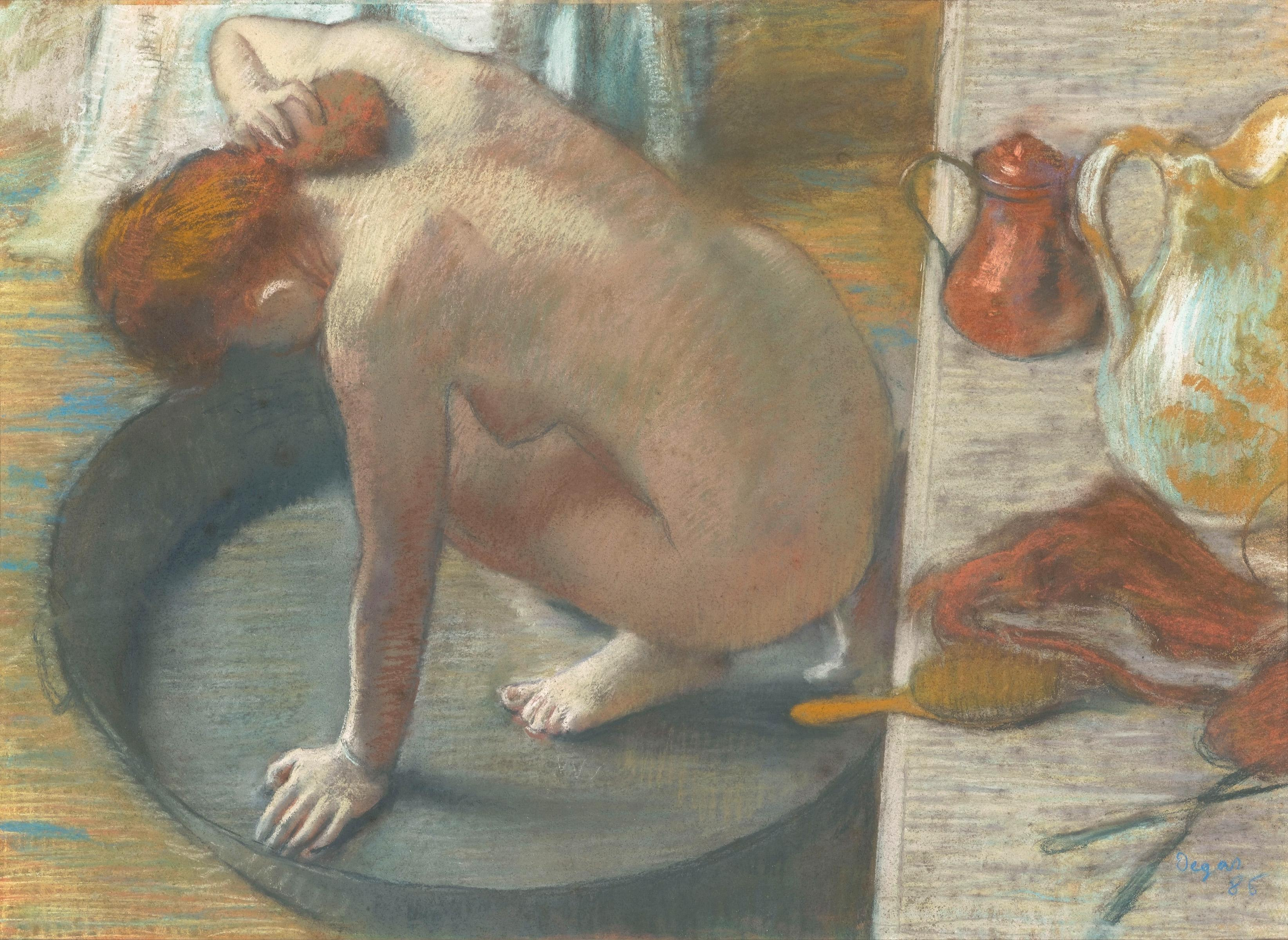
Degas – The Tub

- Ivan Aivazovsky – Storm
- Lawrence Alma-Tadema – The Apodyterium
- William Bliss Baker
  - Fallen Monarchs
  - Under the Apple-Trees
- Emmanuel Benner – Mary Magdalene in the Desert
- Anna Bilińska – At the Seashore
- Frederick Brown – Hard Times
- Alexander Calandrelli – Equestrian statue of Frederick William IV (Berlin)
- Gustaf Cederström
  - The Baptists
  - The Salvation Army
- William Merritt Chase – Hattie
- Emmeline Deane – Anna Bilińska
- Edgar Degas
  - The Tub (Musée d'Orsay, Paris)
  - Woman in the Bath (Hill-Stead Museum, Farmington, Connecticut)
- Lowes Cato Dickinson – The Lawn at Goodwood
- Alexander Doyle – Statue of Benjamin Harvey Hill
- Albert Dubois-Pillet
  - The Banks of the Seine at Neuilly
  - Three barges moored alongside an industrial town
- Paul Gauguin – Still Life with Profile of Laval
- Nikolai Ge – Sophia and Alexandra Tolstaya
- Jean-Léon Gérôme
  - Bonaparte Before the Sphinx
  - The End of the Session
- James Gowans and John Stevenson Rhind – Brass Founders' Pillar
- James Guthrie – In the Orchard
- Margaret Bernadine Hall – Fantine
- Vilhelm Hammershøi – Frederikke Hammershøi, the artist's mother
- Winslow Homer – Eight Bells
- Pierre-Georges Jeanniot – La ligne de feu, 16 août 1870
- Fernand Khnopff – The Garden
- Benjamin Williams Leader – Evening After Rain, Worcestershire
- Alexander Litovchenko – Tsar Alexis and Archbishop Nikon Venerating the Relics of Patriarch Philip
- Edwin Long – The Discovery of Moses
- John Everett Millais
  - Portia
  - Portrait of Thomas Oldham Barlow
- Claude Monet
  - Haystack at Giverny
  - The Manneporte at Étretat
  - The Port Coton Pyramids
  - Study of a Figure Outdoors: Woman with a Parasol, facing left
- Albert Joseph Moore – Silver
- Henry Moore – Mount's Bay
- Edvard Munch – The Sick Child
- Edward Poynter – Mary, Countess of Wemyss
- Jean-François Raffaëlli – At the Caster's
- Cristóbal Rojas – La miseria
- John Singer Sargent
  - Carnation, Lily, Lily, Rose
  - Millet's Garden
- Georges Seurat
  - The Lighthouse at Honfleur
  - A Sunday Afternoon on the Island of La Grande Jatte – 1884 (Art Institute of Chicago)
- Henryk Siemiradzki – Christ with Martha and Mary
- Solomon Joseph Solomon – Ajax and Cassandra
- Vincent van Gogh
  - Le Moulin de la Galette (series)
  - Skull of a Skeleton with Burning Cigarette (approximate date)
  - Vase with Poppies
- Georg von Rosen – Nils Adolf Erik Nordenskiöld with the Vega
- George Frederick Watts – Hope
- Anders Zorn – Sommarnöje

== Births ==
- January – René Beeh, German painter and draughtsman from Alsace (died 1922)
- March 1 – Oskar Kokoschka, Austrian artist, poet and playwright (died 1980)
- March 15 – Gerda Wegener, Danish artist (died 1940)
- April 19 – Hermine David, French painter (died 1970)
- June 14 – Archibald Nicoll, New Zealand painter (died 1953)
- August 7 – Wilhelm Gimmi, Swiss painter (died 1965)
- September 1 – Tarsila do Amaral, Brazilian modernist artist (died 1973)
- September 16 – Jean Arp, Alsatian artist and writer (died 1966)
- October 17 – Andrej Bicenko, Russian fresco painter and muralist (died 1973)
- December 8 – Diego Rivera, Mexican painter and muralist (died 1957)
- December 15 – Jean Paul Slusser, painter, designer, art critic, professor, and director of the University of Michigan Museum of Art (died 1981)
- Viktor Jansson, Finnish sculptor (died 1958)
- Duncan Phillips, American art collector and critic (died 1966)

== Deaths ==
- January 7 – Richard Dadd, painter (born 1817)
- April 16 – Andrew Nicholl, Irish painter (born 1804)
- May 19 – Arthur Quartley – American painter (born 1839)
- June 29 – Adolphe Joseph Thomas Monticelli, French painter (born 1824)
- July 21 – Karl von Piloty, painter (born 1826)
- August 25 – Charles Callahan Perkins, art critic and author (born 1823)
- September 17 – Asher Brown Durand, painter of the Hudson River School (born 1796)
- September 23 – Thomas Webster, painter (born 1800)
- November 20 – William Bliss Baker, American painter (born 1859)
