= 1965 in art =

Events from the year 1965 in art.

== Events ==
- March 19 – A record price of 760,000 guineas is paid at Christie's London auction house for Rembrandt's painting Titus.
- May – Avant-garde artists Marta Minujín and Rubén Santantonín present La Menesunda in Buenos Aires, one of the first installations in art history.
- September – Indica Gallery counterculture bookshop and art gallery opens in London.
- October 7 – Release in the United States of the biographical film The Agony and the Ecstasy with Charlton Heston portraying Michelangelo.
- December – Max's Kansas City nightclub opens in New York City; it quickly became a hangout of choice for artists and sculptors of the New York School and other members of the avant-garde.

== Exhibitions ==
- January - Shape and Structure (with works by Frank Stella, Neil Williams, Charles Hinman, Will Insley, Larry Bell, Donald Judd, Robert Morris, Carl Andre, and Robert Murray) and curated by Henry Geldzahler, Barbara Rose, and Frank Stella).

== Awards ==
- Archibald Prize: Clifton Pugh – R A Henderson
- John Moores Painting Prize – Michael Tyzack for " Alesso 'B' "
- British sculptor Barbara Hepworth is created a Dame.

== Works ==
- Yaacov Agam – Double Metamorphosis II
- Joseph Beuys – How to Explain Pictures to a Dead Hare (performance piece)
- Salvador Dalí - La Gare de Perpignan
- Mark di Suvero – Bunyon's Chess (sculpture, Seattle)
- Lucian Freud – Reflection with Two Children (self-portrait)
- Norman Lewis
  - Unknown Title (March on Washington)
  - Untitled
- L. S. Lowry
  - Huddersfield
  - Industrial Scene
- Miguel Miramontes – Equestrian statue of José María Morelos
- Roman Opałka – 1965 /1 – ∞
- John Petts – Birmingham, Alabama, 16th Street Baptist Church, West Window
- Fairfield Porter – Elizabeth
- James Rosenquist – F-111
- Andy Warhol – Empire (film, released)
- Carel Willink – To the Future
- David Wynne – Busts of Joan Baez and Oskar Kokoschka
- John Fitzgerald Kennedy Memorial (Portland, Oregon)

== Births ==
- January 21 – Robert Del Naja, English graffiti artist and trip hop musician
- February 20 – Miriam Mone, Northern Irish fashion designer (died 2007)
- March 9 – Brom, American illustrator
- April 20 – Mark Mallia, Maltese painter and sculptor (died 2024)
- June 7 – Damien Hirst, English artist and art collector
- July 9 – Jason Rhoades, American installation artist (died 2006)
- December 16 – Ellen Gallagher, American artist
- date unknown
  - Hurvin Anderson, English painter
  - Tacita Dean, English-born visual artist
  - Andrea Fraser, American performance artist
  - Elizabeth Peyton, American portrait painter
  - Susan Philipsz, Scottish sound artist
  - Jessica Voorsanger, American-born visual artist
  - Alison Watt, Scottish painter

== Deaths ==
- January 3 – Milton Avery, American painter (born 1885)
- January 7 – Anne Redpath, Scottish still life painter (born 1895)
- January 27 – Abraham Walkowitz, American painter working in the Modernist style (born 1878)
- January 30 – Bernard Fleetwood-Walker, English artist (born 1893)
- February 18 – Yevgeny Charushin, Russian graphic artists (born 1901)
- February 24 – Frank H. Mason, English marine and poster painter (born 1875)
- May 7 – Charles Sheeler, American modernist painter and photographer (born 1883)
- May 19 – Albin Polasek, Czech American sculptor (born 1879)
- May 20 – Charles Camoin, French Fauvist painter (born 1879)
- June 14 – Zoltán Kemény, Hungarian Swiss sculptor (born 1907)
- June 21 – Piotr Buchkin, Russian painter and graphic artist (born 1886)
- June 26 – G. David Thompson, American industrialist and collector of modern art (born 1899)
- August 27 – Le Corbusier, Swiss-born French architect and painter (born 1887)
- August 29 – Wilhelm Gimmi, Swiss painter (born 1886)
- September 17 – Wilhelm Heise, German painter (born 1892)
- October 19 – Edward Willis Redfield, American landscape painter (born 1869)
- December 24 – Adolf Hyła, Polish painter and art teacher (born 1897)
- December 27 – Edgar Ende, German painter (born 1901)
- date unknown – George Barker, American painter (born 1882)

== See also ==
- 1965 in fine arts of the Soviet Union
