= Minujín =

Minujín is a surname. Notable people with the surname include:

- Juan Minujín (born 1975), Argentine actor
- Marta Minujín (born 1943), Argentine conceptual and performance artist
