= Equestrian statue of Frederick William IV =

Sculpture in Berlin, Germany

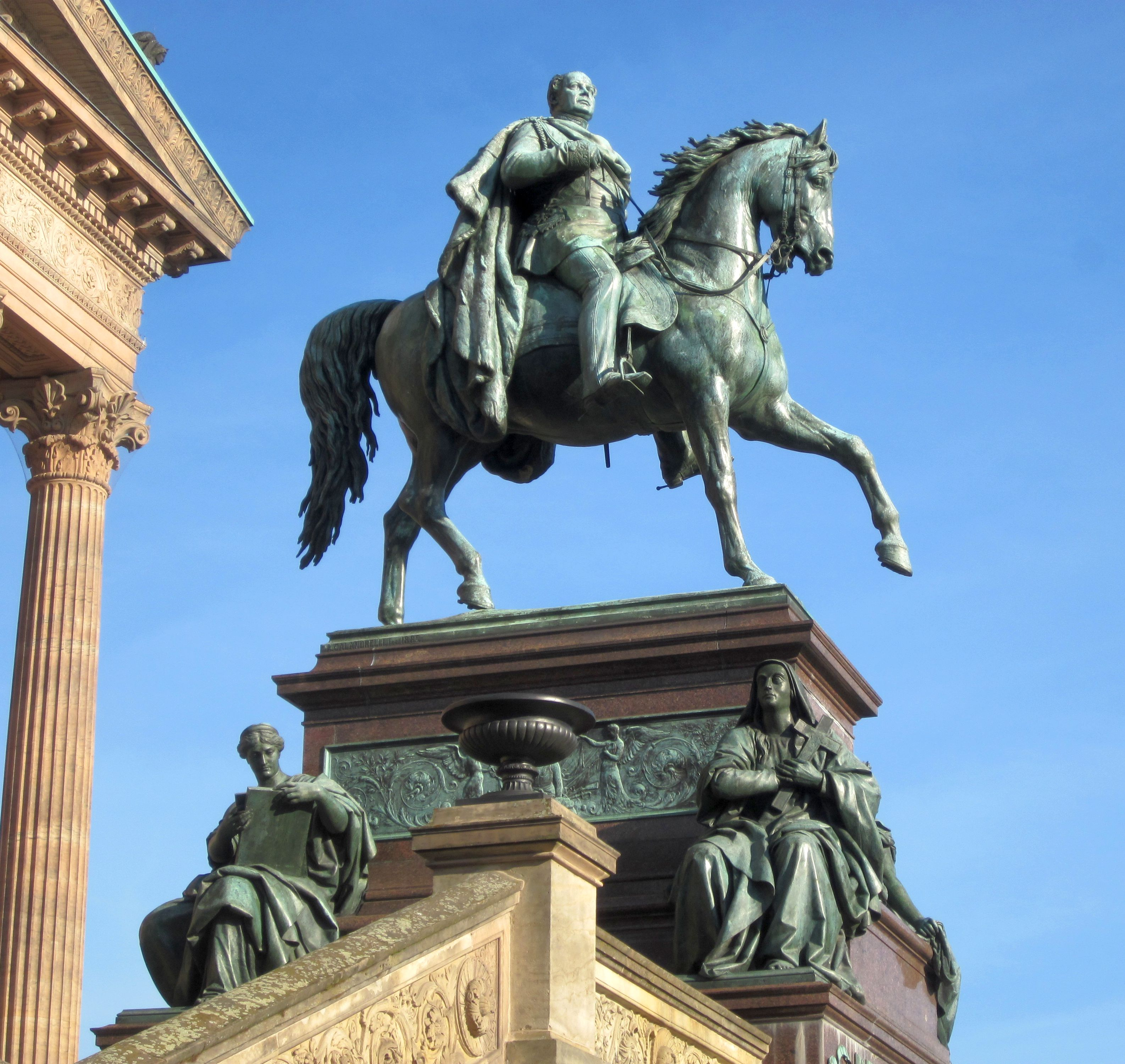
- Artist: Alexander Calandrelli
- Subject: Frederick William IV of Prussia
- Location: Berlin, Germany; 52.5206°N 13.3986°E

The equestrian statue of Frederick William IV is an 1875–86 sculpture of Frederick William IV of Prussia by Alexander Calandrelli, installed in front of the Alte Nationalgalerie in Berlin, Germany.

== See also ==
- 1886 in art
