= Charles Laval =

19th-century French painter

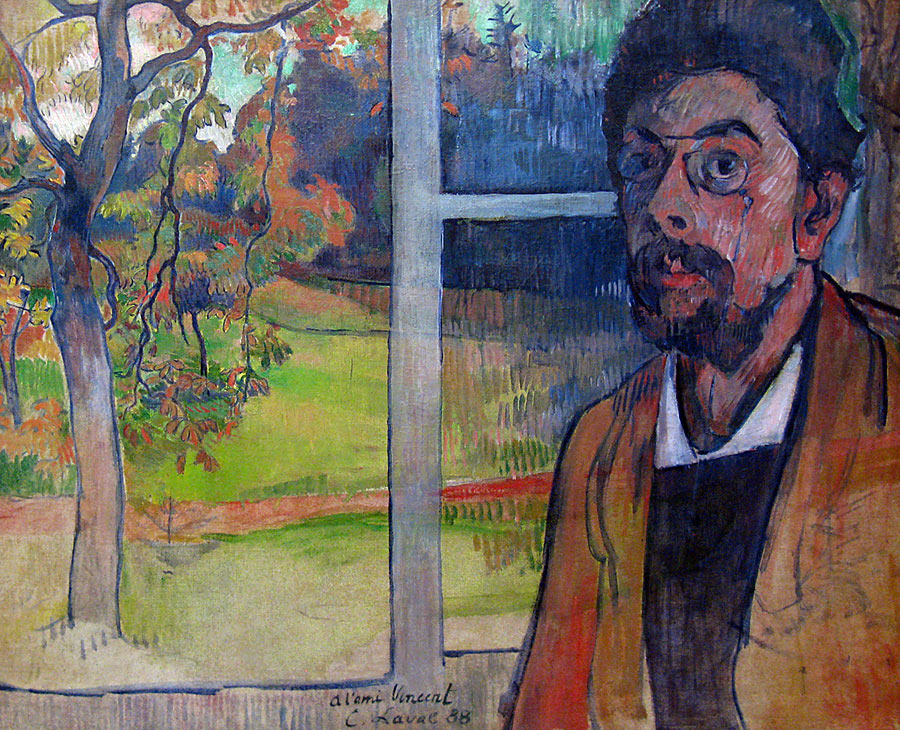
Charles Laval, Self Portrait, 1888, oil on canvas, 50 × 60 cm Van Gogh Museum Amsterdam

Charles Laval (French pronunciation: [ʃaʁl laval]; 17 March 1862 – 27 April 1894) was a French painter associated with the Synthetic movement and Pont-Aven School.

Laval was born in Paris, and was a contemporary and friend of Paul Gauguin and Vincent van Gogh. Gauguin created a portrait of him in 1886 looking at one of Gauguin's ceramic sculptures, entitled Still Life with Profile of Laval.

== Laval and Gauguin ==
Paul Gauguin, Still Life with Profile of Laval, 1886, Indianapolis Museum of Art

Paul Gauguin and Laval both came to Pension Gloanec in Pont-Aven in 1886 and became friends. In search of an exoticism that could provide the key to art, Gauguin and Laval went to Panama in 1887. To gain some subsidies, Laval performs academic portraits (all lost), using his experience received from Leon Bonnat. A series of mishaps caused Laval and Gauguin to leave Central America for the island of Martinique. There he made a small series of landscapes speckled with bright colors, that have been erroneously attributed to Gauguin in the past. Laval died of an illness complicated by tuberculosis in 1894 at the age of 32.

== Laval and Van Gogh ==
Laval’s self-portrait came about because of an agreement between Van Gogh and several of his friends. Van Gogh asked Laval, Paul Gauguin and Émile Bernard to send him a portrait, in exchange for one of his own self-portraits.

Van Gogh was impressed by Laval's contribution. He included a small drawing of the Laval portrait in a letter to Theo, in order to give his brother an idea of the painting. He described Laval's painting as powerful, distinguished and precisely one of the paintings that you talk about: that one has in one's possession before others have recognized the talent.

== Selected bibliography ==
- John Rewald, Post-Impressionism, from Van Gogh to Gauguin, Paris, 1961
- Wladyslawa Jaworska, Gauguin and the School of Pont-Aven, Neuchatel, 1971
- Sophie Monneret, Impressionism and his era, vol. 1, Paris, 1978 1, Paris, 1978
- Karen Pope, Gauguin and Martinique, Austin, 1980
- Welsh-Bogomila Ovsharov, Vincent van Gogh & the Birth of Cloisonism, Toronto, 1981
- Victor Merlhes, Correspondence of Paul Gauguin 1872-1888, Paris, 1984
- John Loiza, How Gauguin made a wonderful discovery of Martinique, Le Carbet, 1990
- Émile Bernard, Commentaries on Art, Volume I, Paris, 1994
- Daniel Wildenstein, Sylvie Crussard, Catalogue raisonné of the work of Paul Gauguin 1873-1888, Paris, 2001
Charles Laval's paintings

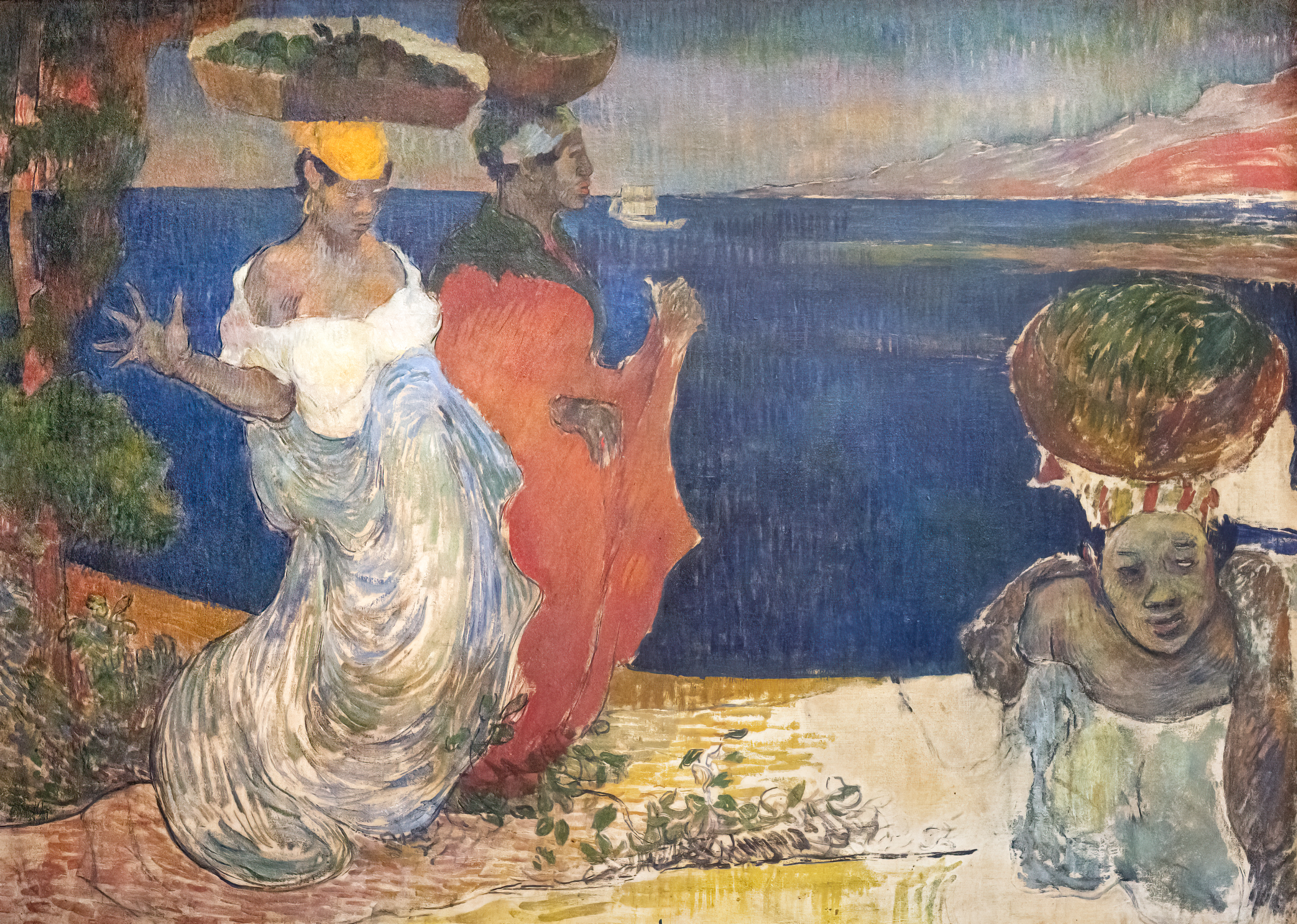
Women by the sea

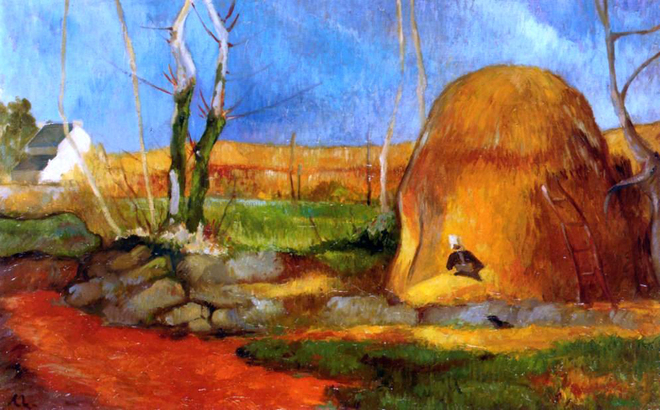
Harvest in Brittany

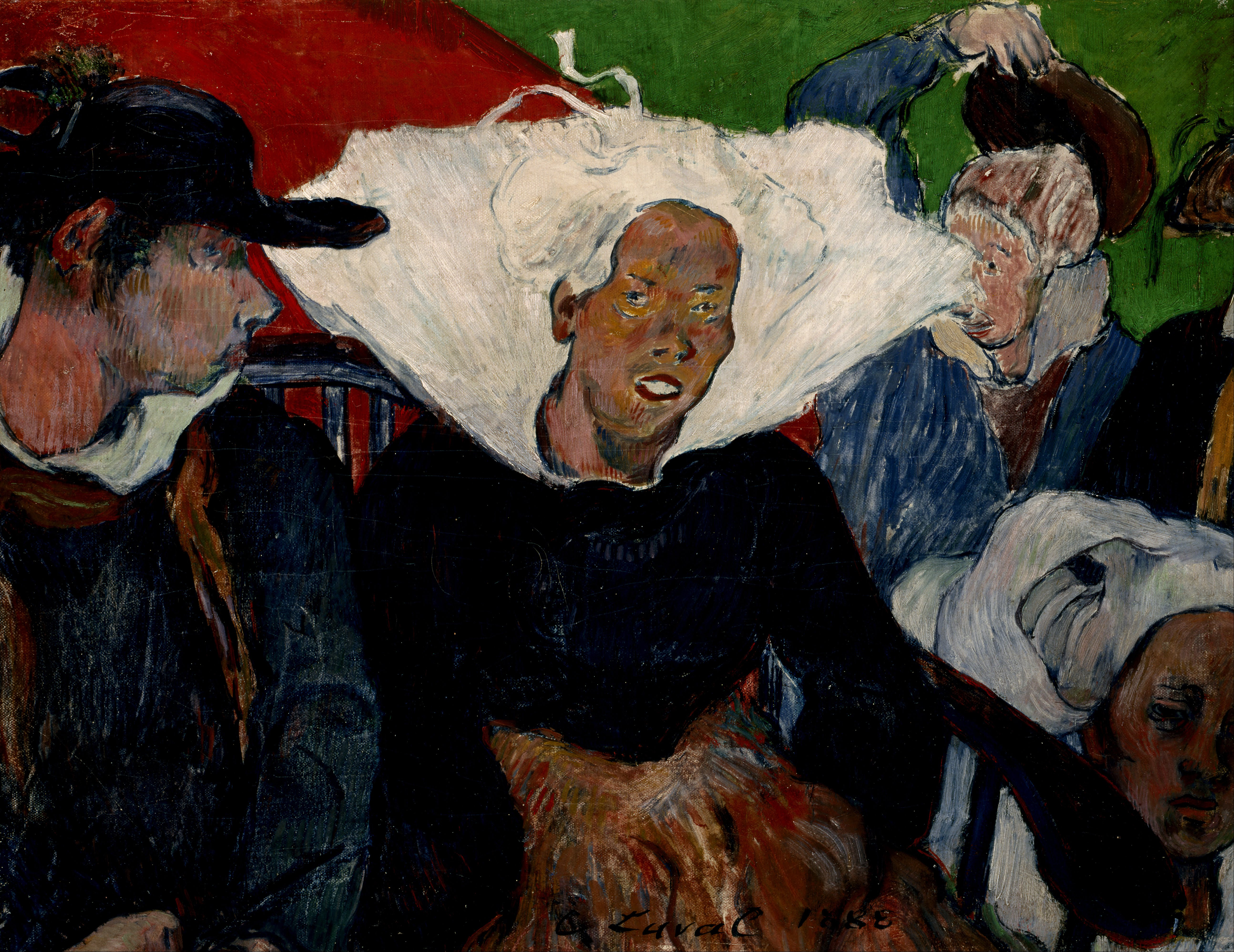
Going to Market, Brittany

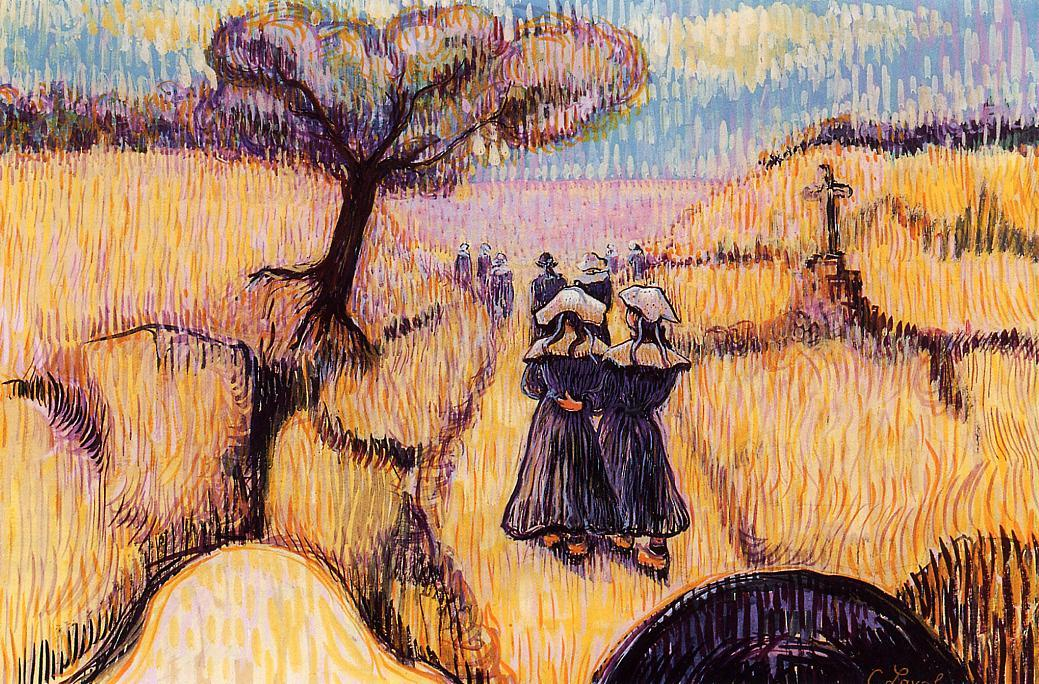
Bretons

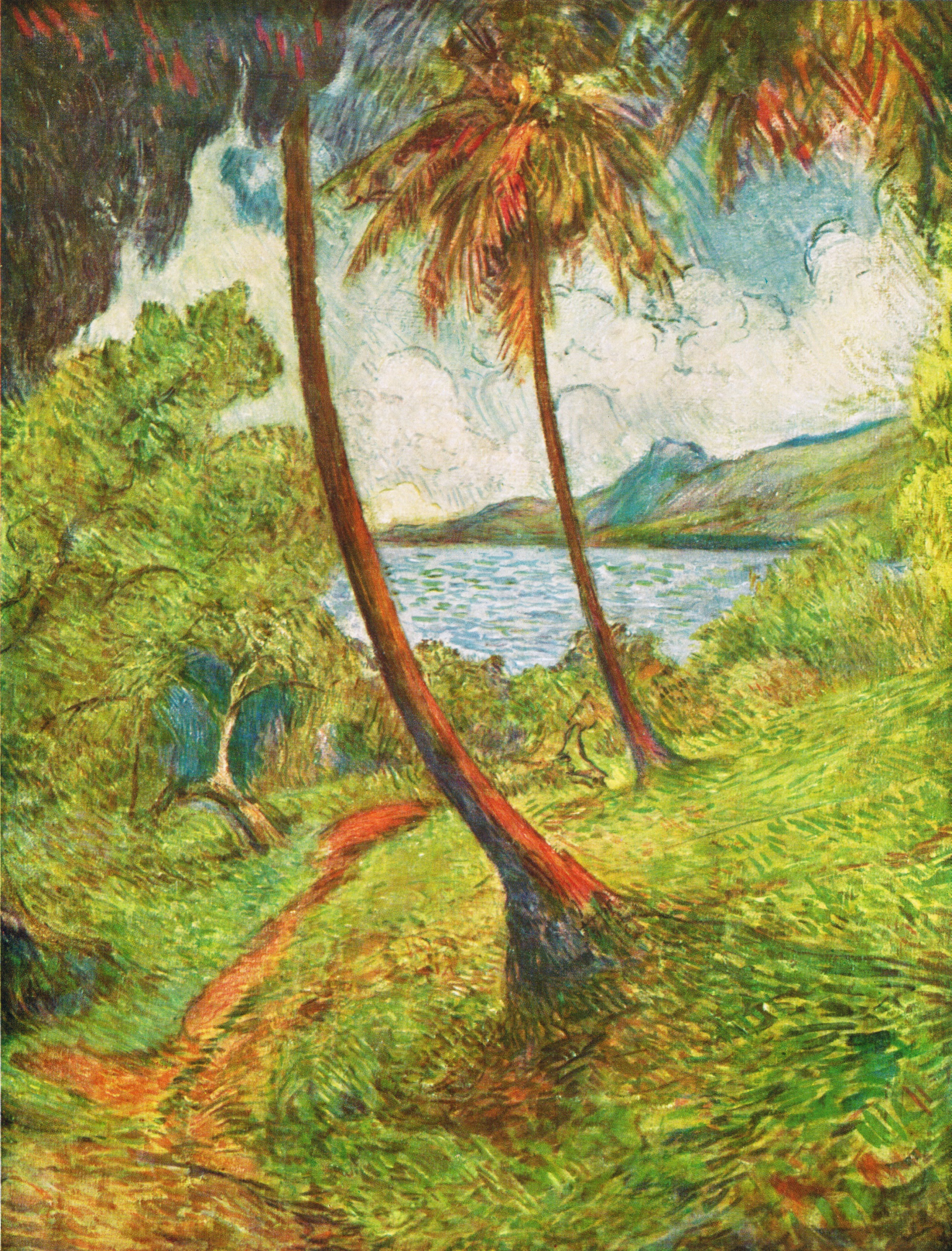
Landscape of Martinique, (1887)
