= Lucien Bégule =

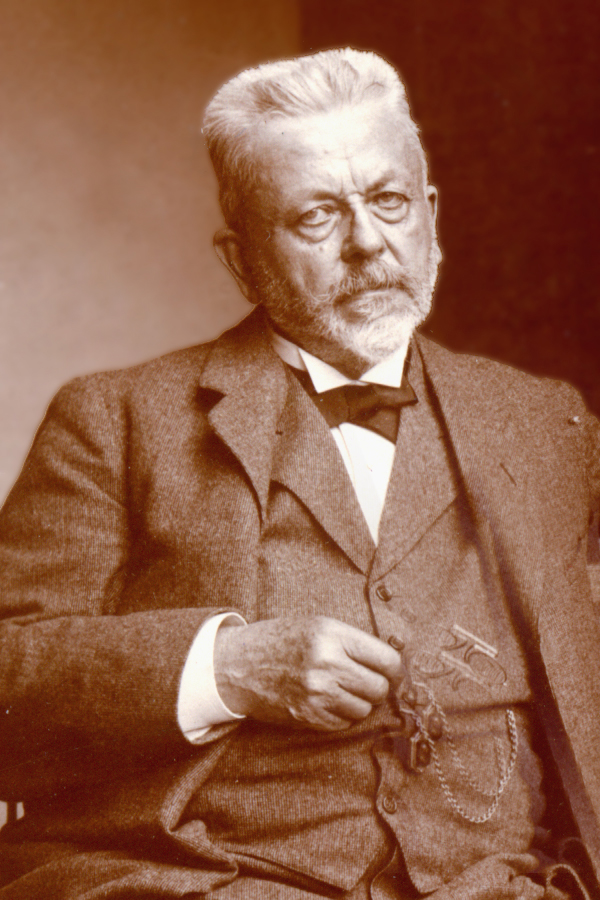
Lucien Bégule (self-photographed, 1914)

Lucien Bégule (10 May 1848, Saint-Genis-Laval - 1 February 1935, Lyon) was a French stained-glass painter, archaeologist, and amateur photographer.

== Biography ==
He was born to Georges Bégule (1805-1882), an auctioneer, and his wife, Stéphanie née Peillon, the daughter of a failed sugar cane grower in Cuba. The atmosphere in his home was both strictly religious and artistic. At the age of eight, he discovered the Histoire générale de la France par les manuscrits by Abel Hugo. He made copies of its manuscript illustrations, which inspired his interest in the Middle Ages. The following year, he was sent a to boarding school in La Mulatière. At fifteen, he entered Notre Dame de Mongré High School where, thanks to his chemistry teacher, he developed an interest in photography.

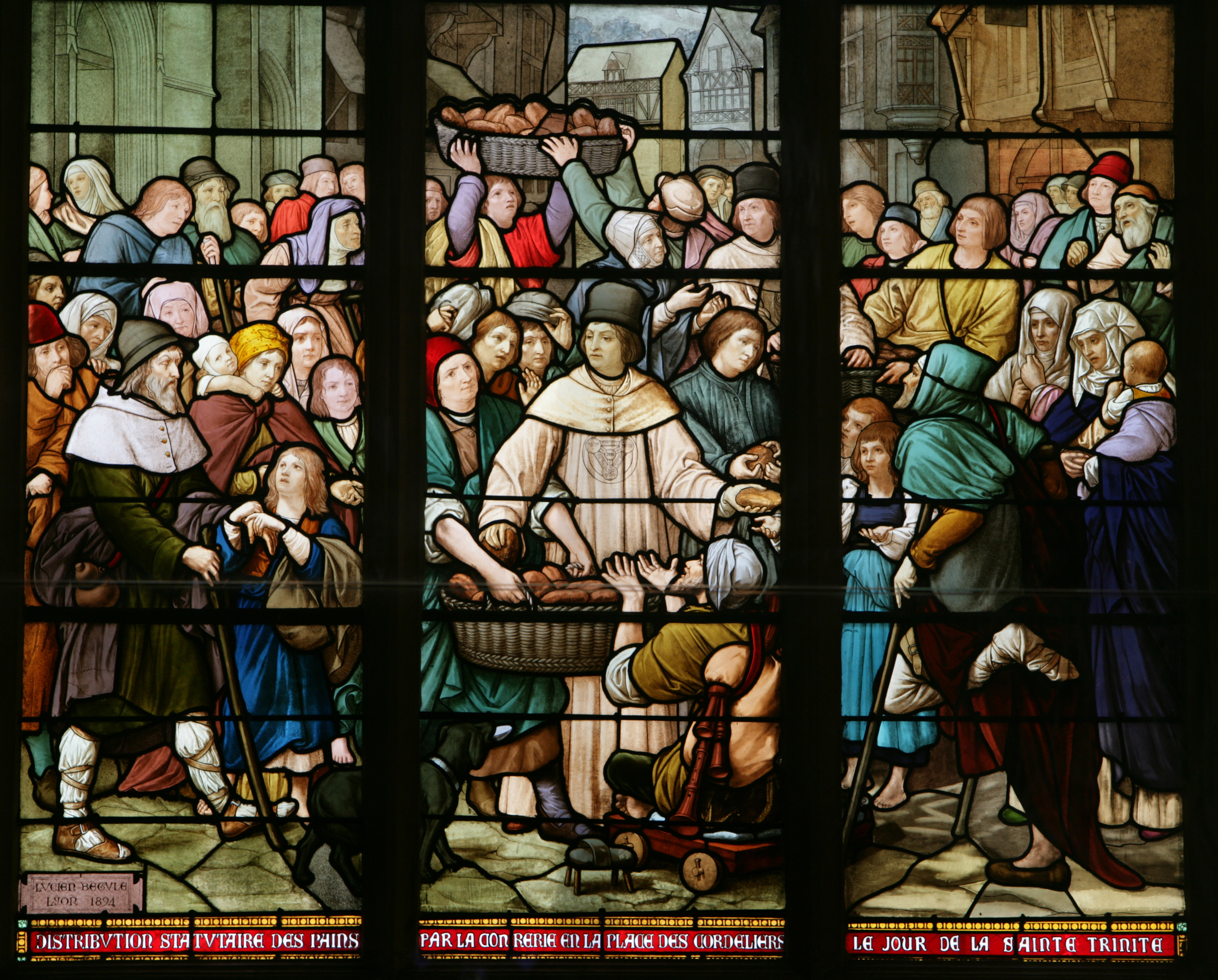
Saint Nicetius feeding the poor, Saint-Nizier Church, from a design by Louis Jacquesson de la Chevreuse

Later, through one of his fellow students, he made the acquaintance of Jean-Baptiste Chatigny, and began to work in his art studio. He also had lessons in ornamental and decorative arts from Pierre Bossan. At the age of twenty, he assisted Bossan in planning the construction of the Basilica of Notre-Dame de Fourvière. Chaligny's brother-in-law, Pierre Miciol, owned a glass painting workshop. Bégule became his partner in 1873, and collaborated with him on several projects. They separated in 1875, due to financial problems, and he set up his own workshop, but attracted little business. From 1877 to 1880, he collaborated with the ornamental painter, Jacobé Razuret (1829-1895). While there, he made a study of the cathedrals in Chartres, Sens, Bourges and Troyes, and decided to devote himself entirely to glass painting.

In 1879, he obtained permission, and financial support, from his father to build a studio and workshop behind their family home. It was opened for business in 1880. That same year saw the birth of his son, Joseph-Émile, who would also become a glass painter. Most of his work was initially done for use in Lyon, although he served the départements of Loire and Ardèche as well. Later, he would fulfill orders from throughout France. As his reputation spread, some came from cities overseas; including Nagasaki (the Immaculate Conception Cathedral), Cairo (the palace of Tigrane Pasha), and Rio de Janeiro (church of the Sisters of saint Vincent de Paul).

His peak productive years were 1891 to 1898. Eventually, his workshop would create over four hundred windows; though many were variations on basic designs. Due to his interest in the Middle Ages and archaeology, he made certain that his windows were done in a scrupulously archaic style. He also participated in numerous restoration projects. While concentrating on sacred buildings, his works are present in secular settings as well; mostly homes, where they are not accessible for viewing by the public. Occasionally, notable artists were invited to participate in the design process; including Eugène Grasset, Charles Lebayle, and Tony Tollet. A depiction of Saint George and the Dragon, from a design by Grasset, was displayed at the Exposition Universelle (1889), and is now in the collection of the Museum of Fine Arts of Lyon.

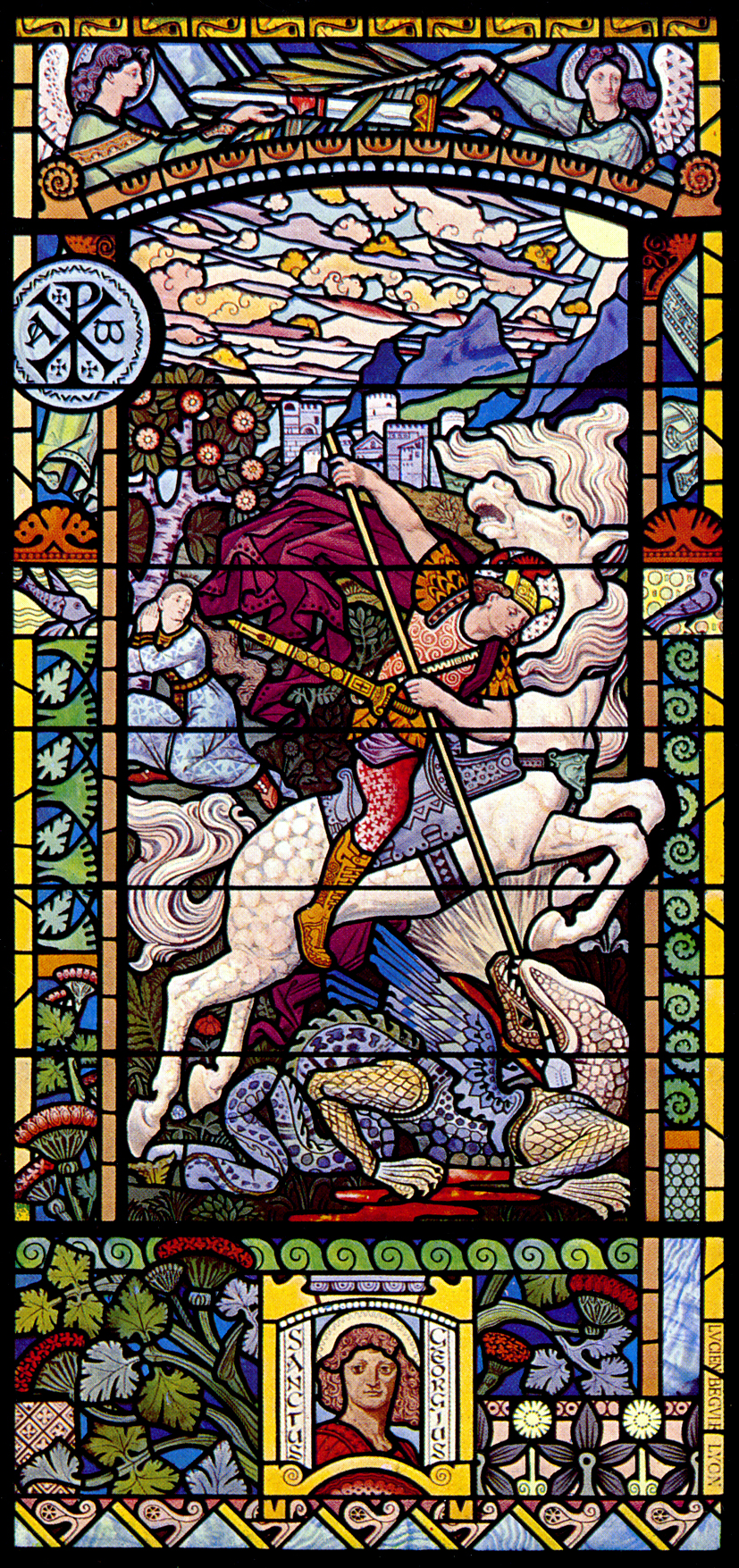
Saint George and the Dragon

Following the enactment of the Law on the Separation of the Churches and the State, in 1905, he closed his workshop. After that, his involvement with archaeology deepened, he joined the Société Française d'Archéologie, and published several monographs dealing with religious structures; such as Les Incrustations décoratives des Cathédrales de Lyon et de Vienne, and L'Abbaye de Fontenay et l'architecture cistercienne.

In 1924, he succeeded to the post of "Conservateur des antiquités et objets d'art", for the Rhône département. In 1925, after two years of research, he published Antiquité et Richesse d'Art dans le Département du Rhône, and was appointed a divisional inspector for the Société. In 1928, he was named a Knight in the Legion of Honor, The following year, the Société promoted him to Inspector General. He died at his home in 1935, aged eighty-six. A small street in Lyon has been named after him.
