= La Menesunda =

1965 art work by Marta Minujín and Rubén Santantonín

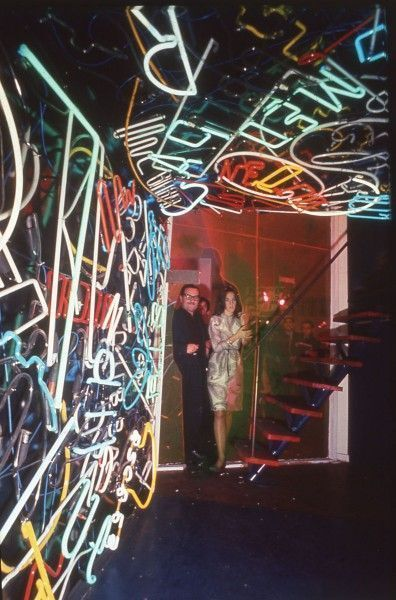
- Marta Minujín and Rubén Santantonín entering La Menesunda
- Artist: Marta Minujín; Rubén Santantonín
- Year: 1965
- Type: Mixed media

La Menesunda (Lunfardo for "mayhem") is an installation art work by Argentine artists Marta Minujín and Rubén Santantonín, made in collaboration with Pablo Suárez, David Lamelas, Rodolfo Prayón, Floreal Amor and Leopoldo Maler. It was presented on May 27, 1965, at the Torcuato di Tella Institute in Buenos Aires.

The work, alongside that of Niki de Saint Phalle, Christo and Claes Oldenburg, counts among the earliest large-scale environments or installations in art history. La Menesunda revolutionized Buenos Aires, attracting a large number of visitors and several news reports, and is now considered one of the greatest milestones in the history of Argentine art.

La Menesunda was recreated for the first time in 2015 and exhibited at the Buenos Aires Museum of Modern Art. Since then, the installation was also recreated in June 2019 in New York City's New Museum (its first-ever presentation in the United States), and was due to be exhibited October 2020 at Tate Liverpool, however this was temporarily delayed due to the COVID-19 pandemic. An 8-minute film of La Menesunda, originally shot in 16 mm, has been part of the Museo Reina Sofía collection since 2016.

== Gallery ==
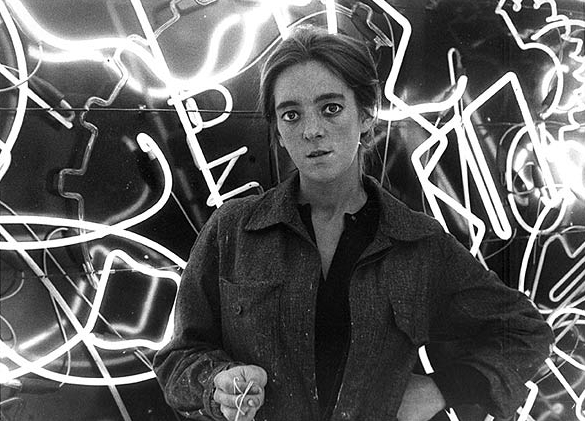
Marta Minujín inside La Menesunda

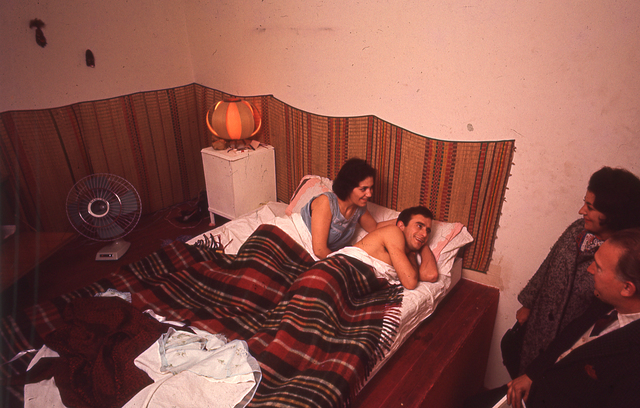
One of the rooms in the installation included a young couple lying in bed

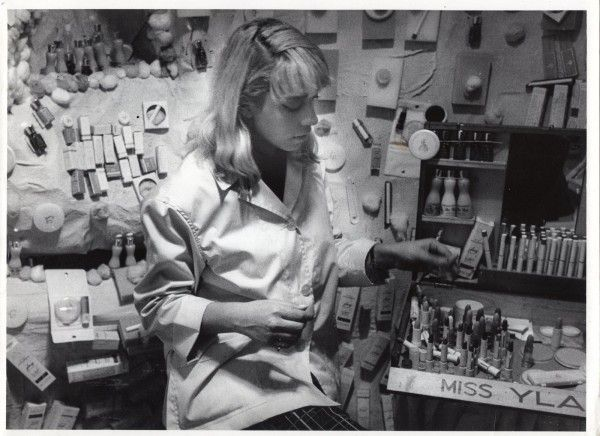
A makeup artist inside one of the installation's room

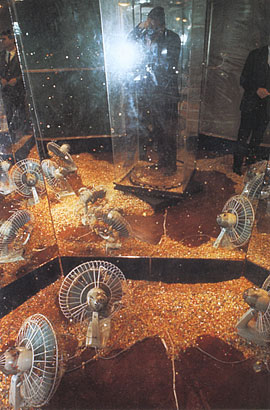
A room in the installation with fans, mirror walls and confetti

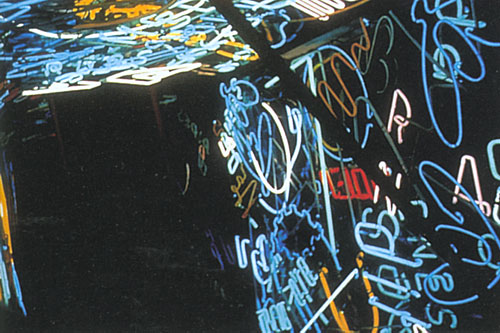
One of the chambers of La Menesunda, covered in neon lights

== See also ==
- 1965 in Argentina
- 1965 in art
