= Vase with Poppies =

Painting by Vincent van Gogh

Vase with Poppies (F279)
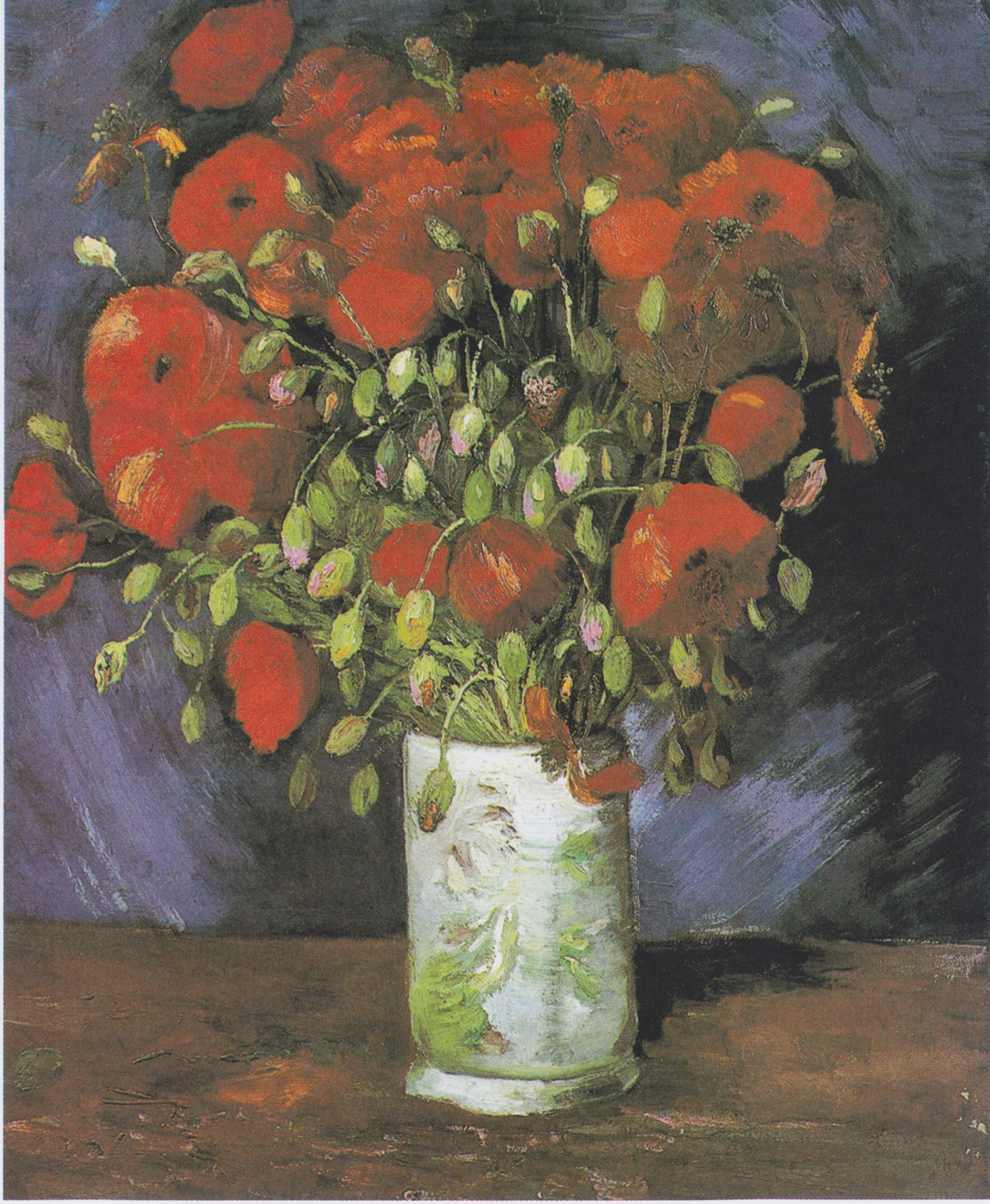
- Artist: Vincent van Gogh
- Year: 1886
- Catalogue: F279; JH1104
- Medium: Oil on canvas
- Dimensions: 56.0 cm × 46.5 cm (22.0 in × 18.3 in)
- Location: Wadsworth Atheneum; Hartford, Connecticut

Vase with Poppies is an 1886 oil painting created in Paris, France by Post-Impressionist Dutch artist Vincent van Gogh.

== Flowers as a subject ==
Flowers were the subject of many of van Gogh's paintings in Paris, and one of his many interests due in great part to his regard for flowers. As he said to his brothers Theo Van Gogh and Cor Van Gogh, "You will see that by making a habit of looking at Japanese pictures you will come to love to make up bouquets and do things with flowers all the more." To his sister, Wil, van Gogh advised her to cultivate her own garden, like Voltaire's Candide, to find joy and meaning in life. After he left Paris and settled in Arles, van Gogh painted his second group of Sunflowers in 1888 and 1889. His paintings of sunflowers in vases are among his most well known paintings.

== Flowers delivered to Van Gogh in Paris ==
In Paris friends and acquaintances sent bouquets of flowers weekly for his still life paintings. He also purchased bouquets inexpensively, choosing flowers in a variety of colors for his paintings. In a letter to his sister Wil he wrote, "Last year I painted almost nothing but flowers so I could get used to colors other than grey - pink, soft or bright green, light blue, violet, yellow, glorious red." That was an exaggeration; during his time in Paris he painted 230 paintings, about 30 of which were flowers. Yet, the comment demonstrates his interest in painting flowers as a subject and to further develop his appreciation and understanding of color.

== Inspection and analysis ==
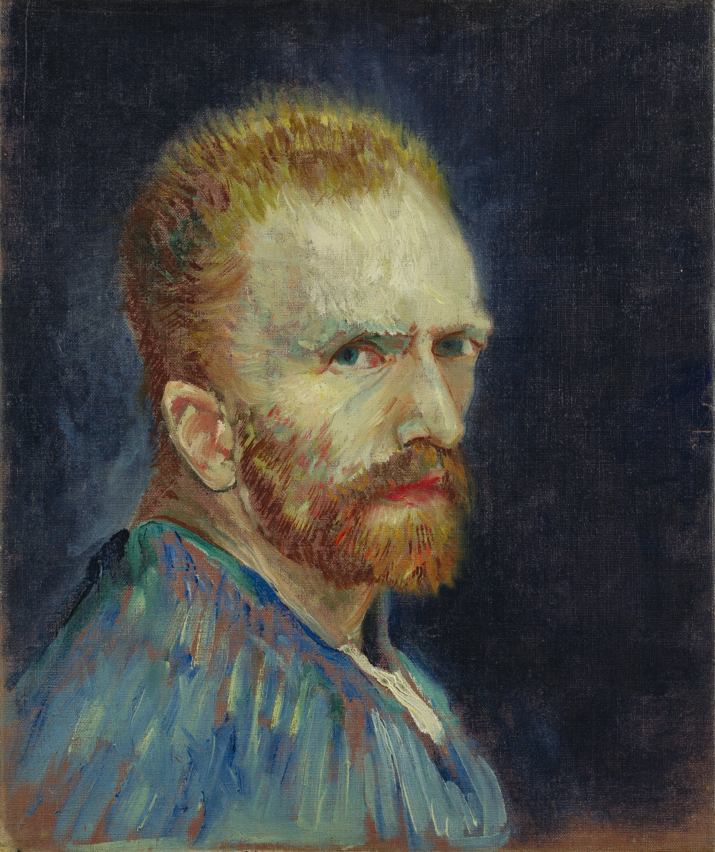
The Wadsworth also owns a self-portrait by Van Gogh

The painting, which was donated by Anne Parrish Titzell in 1957 to the permanent collection of the Wadsworth Atheneum, was called into question by art historian Walter Feilchenfeldt in 1990 as to its authenticity. It was declared genuine by the Van Gogh Museum in Amsterdam, after having been sent there for inspection by the Wadsworth to determine if it was a work by the hand of the artist or an impostor. An x-ray image of the painting showed the outline of the portrait of a man underneath the flower painting, and the museum declared the work consistent with other paintings Van Gogh created upon moving from Antwerp that year.

== See also ==
- List of works by Vincent van Gogh
