= Still Life with Profile of Laval =

Painting by Paul Gauguin

- Nature morte au profil de Laval (French)
- Artist: Paul Gauguin
- Year: 1886
- Type: Oil painting on canvas
- Dimensions: 46 cm × 38 cm (18 in × 15 in)
- Location: Indianapolis Museum of Art, Indianapolis

Still Life with Profile of Laval is an 1886 oil painting by French artist Paul Gauguin, located in the Indianapolis Museum of Art, which is in Indianapolis, Indiana. It depicts Gauguin's friend Charles Laval in profile with an assortment of inanimate objects, including a ceramic pot Gauguin made himself.

== Description ==
This combination portrait/still life shows Gauguin's ability to take the best of various artists he admired. For example, the abrupt way Laval's face is cut off is a tribute to Edgar Degas' off-centered, oddly-cropped compositions, while setup of the still life and the parallel brush strokes in the fruit harken to Paul Cézanne's work. In addition to those other much-admired artists, Gauguin inserted himself into the composition in the form of the ceramic "monstrosity" he created, a strange interruption which Laval examines quizzically. He deliberately quotes the two most renowned artists in the genres of modern life and still life, then refuses to resolve them harmoniously. Instead, Gauguin leaves them disrupted, even incoherent in this, his first in a series of paintings on the challenges of creativity. Laval, the viewer's surrogate, tries to guess his next move.

== Historical information ==
Gauguin and Laval met in the summer of 1886, and the younger artist soon became Gauguin's pupil. This subservient role is indicated by Laval's fixed gaze upon the pot Gauguin made. The pot itself helps place the creation of this painting very late in 1886, after Gauguin had returned to Paris, because it was not created until at least October. Gauguin valued his ceramic experiments highly, as both artistic objects and sources of income. He wrote to his wife Mette that this particular pot was worth 100 francs. It cannot currently be located, and may have been destroyed.

Vincent van Gogh had suggested a portrait exchange among the small group of artists (also including Émile Bernard) gathered at Pont-Aven in order to create a greater sense of community, a tradition known as Freundschaftsbild. By rendering them all in new artistic styles, the collective announced their abandonment of naturalism and adoption of Symbolism.

=== Acquisition ===
Still Life with Profile of Laval was acquired in 1998 as part of a collection of Gauguin and his Pont-Aven coterie. Samuel Josefowitz, a Swiss collector, amassed the 17 paintings and 84 prints, worth an estimated $30 million. The Lilly Endowment raised $20 million toward that goal with a challenge grant. The remainder was raised by the IMA, with an undisclosed amount being given by Josefowitz himself, a museum trustee. Josefowitz also donated all the prints for free. He acquired the Pont-Aven collection in the 1950s and '60s, before that period's importance in Gauguin's development was fully appreciated. This particular painting hangs in the Jane H. Fortune Gallery and has the acquisition number 1998.167.

== See also ==
- The Flageolet Player on the Cliff
- List of paintings by Paul Gauguin
