= Charles Lebayle =

French painter

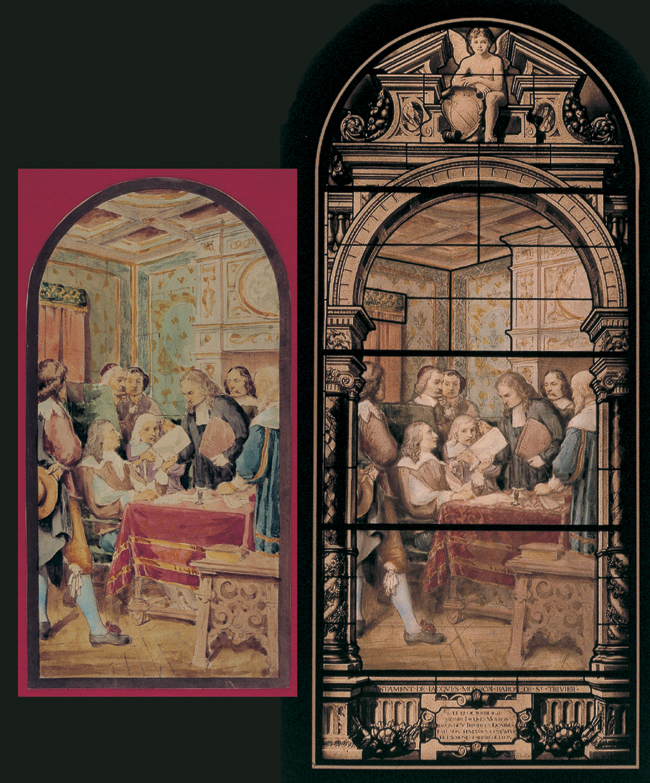
Window at the Hôpital de la Charité in Lyon: Sketch by Lebayle; finished window by Lucien Bégule.

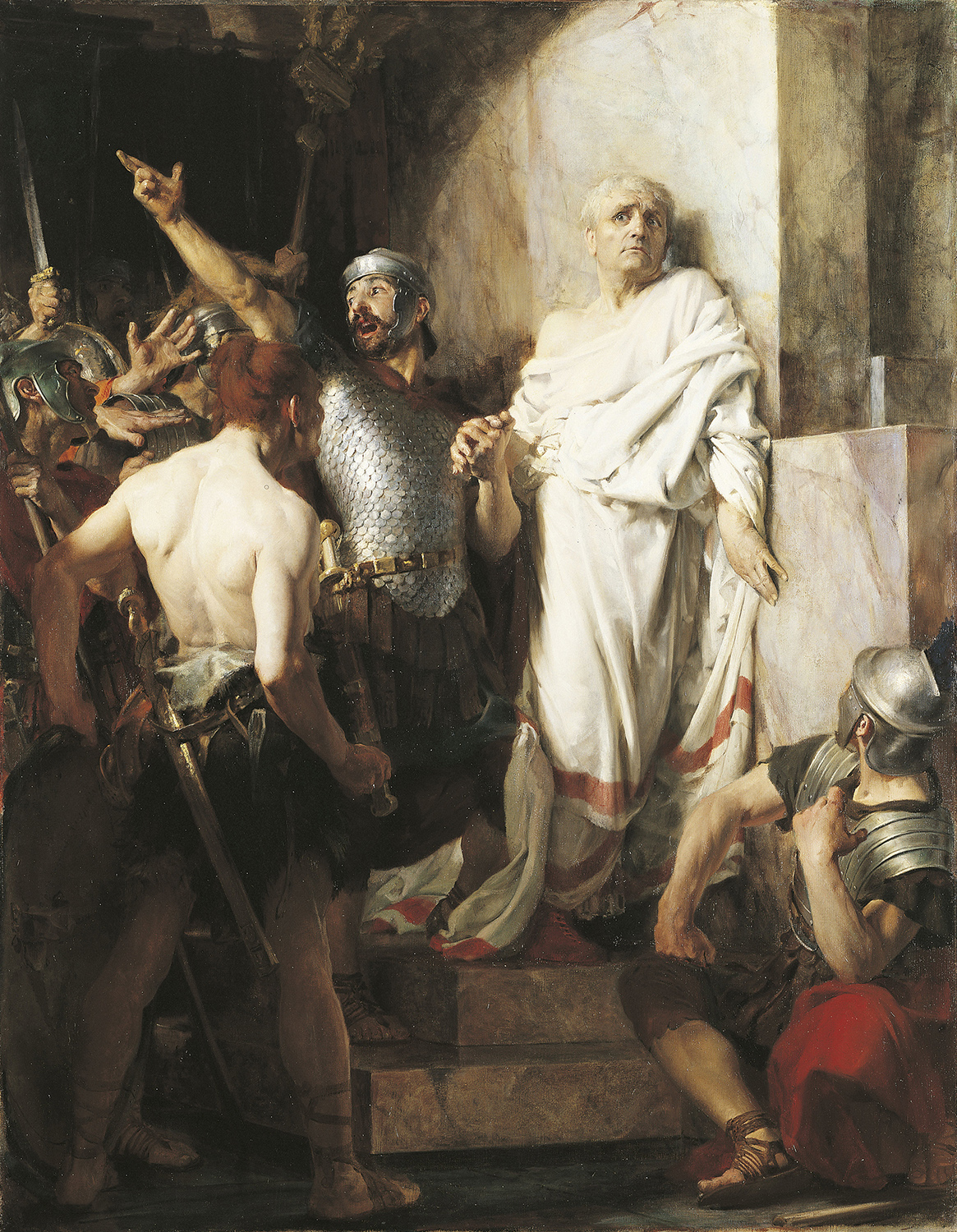
Claudius Being Proclaimed Emperor

Charles Lebayle (28 May 1856, in Paris – 22 January 1898, in Paris) was a French painter and designer, who is mostly known for his collaborations with stained glass makers.

== Biography ==
His father ran a window dressing and decorating company. At the age of fourteen, he began attending evening classes at the École Nationale Supérieure des Arts Décoratifs, where he became a student of Alexandre Cabanel and the sculptor Aimé Millet. After his father's death, he became responsible for his family and tried to maintain the business, but it ultimately failed.

His début at the Salon came in 1877. Rather than paintings, he exhibited works in stained glass; a suggestion which came from his friend Henri Carot, who would later become a well known glass painter. He won a competition at the École des Beaux-arts in 1879, then studied oil painting with Adolphe Yvon, in classes that were open to the public.

In 1885, he worked at Autun Cathedral where he helped create a glass roof depicting the life of the Virgin, from drawings by the architect Lucien Magne and decorator François-Émile Ehrmann. He also created the main window at the Vannes Town Hall, together with Charles Champigneulle.

A year later, he won the Prix de Rome for Claudius Proclaimed Emperor, and spent two years at the Villa Medicis. While there, he painted a mural at the Villa called "The Sea and the Shepherd". However, none of the paintings he created during his stay were purchased by the French government, as was customary. Following this disappointment, he lost his sister and mother.

When he returned to France, he took a position in the workshops of the famous stained glass artist, Lucien Bégule, and helped create windows for the Hôpital de la Charité in Lyon, most of which were destroyed when the building was demolished in 1933.

After making an unsuccessful attempt to establish his own glass painting business and a continuing failure to achieve recognition as an artist in his own right, he became despondent and shot himself through the heart.
