= Claudius Proclaimed Emperor =

Painting by Charles Lebayle

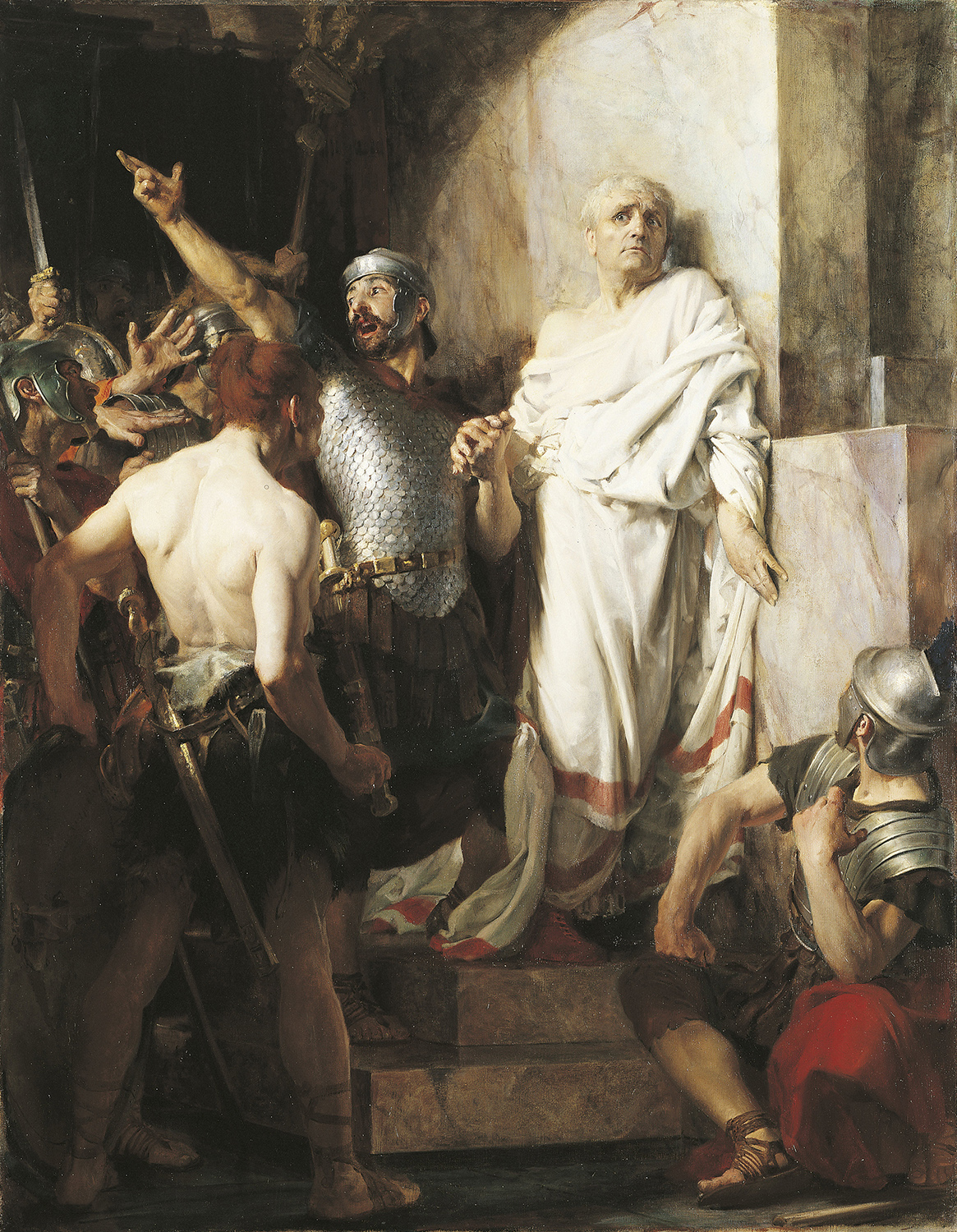
- Artist: Charles Lebayle
- Year: 1886
- Dimensions: 146.5 cm (57.7 in) × 113.4 cm (44.6 in)
- Location: Beaux-Arts de Paris
- Accession No.: PRP 37

Claudius Proclaimed Emperor is an oil on canvas painting by Charles Lebayle, now in the École nationale supérieure des beaux-arts, in Paris.

The subject set for the Prix de Rome in 1886 was the event of the proclamation of Claudius as emperor in 41 CE as described in Suetonius's Lives of the Caesars (Claudius, 10). Lebayle won his category with the work, gaining him a two-year stay at the Villa Medici in Rome.
