= Rubén Santantonín =

Argentine visual artist (1919–1969)

- Born: 1919; Villa Ballester, Argentina
- Died: 1969 (aged 49–50); Buenos Aires, Argentina
- Movement: Conceptual Art

Rubén Santantonín (1919–1969) was an Argentine visual artist. Although he was active in the Pop art movement through his participation in Torcuato di Tella Institute, Santantonín's personal artwork was based more on conceptual and abstract idealism. His artworks tended to involve mixed media that would challenge the viewer's relationship with objects and materials.

== Career ==
Born in 1919, Santantonín did not have any formal art education or training, but was largely self-taught. Indeed, he was largely unknown in the art world until 1943 when he entered the artistic world from the sidelines. Then, during one of his first exhibitions, at the Van Riel Gallery in 1960, he was “discovered” by two Avant-garde artists of the time, Luis Felipe Noé and Kenneth Kemble.

Santantonín worked hard to create new and sensual artworks, and while working towards this through his new ideas, he created an immense future for himself. He wanted his creations to fuel the collective power of a transformation movement he imagined was possible during his time and the scope of his radicalism conveyed in his brief writings detailed that at the moment, it was a perfect opportunity to stand up for “unstable art”.

During the middle of his career, Santantonín’s work had an immediate impact through his representation of Argentina in his own exhibitions, such as the Lirolay Gallery in 1961 and 1941, as well as at exhibitions L’Art Argentin Actuel (Musée National d'Art Moderne, Paris, 1963), New art of Argentina (Walker Art Center, Minneaopolis, 1964), and at the VII Sao Paulo in which he participated in.

== Arte-cosa ==
While Santantonín did not go to school or have any formal training, he eventually made a name for himself through his creation of a unique mode of art making, which he called "Arte-cosa" (or "Art-thing"). This mode was developed in an environment saturated with Informalism and Destructive Art.

Constructed out of cardboard, paper, rags, canvas, wire, plaster, and other various materials, the Cosas (or Things) were one of Santantonín's most memorable art pieces. Through these pieces, Santantonín hoped to express what he called an “existential crossroads” by creating fragile pieces that could not stand the test of time and indifference. Instead of giving every piece an individual name, he categorized them under a single title, thus avoiding placing his sculptures in the realm of objectivity. By doing this, Santantonín hoped his audience would immerse themselves in these “things” with their own pleasure, distress and imagination. The "things" would provide a sensorial experience that could draw on self-destructive feelings, and prevent any contemplation of meaning or purpose. So Santantonín's investment in Existentialism led him to created art that explored the essential aspects of human existence, including the role of sensory perception and human thought processes. In this way, Santantonín distanced himself from traditional disciplines of art by focusing on ambiguous forms that possessed an existential intensity. Through this, he hoped to introduce a new level of experience in the cultural life of Buenos Aires.

== La Menesunda ==
In 1965, he collaborated with Marta Minujín to create an installation called La Menesunda (Mayhem), . While Minujin and Santantonín were unlikely partners due to their generational gap, these two artists became close from the beginning based on their mutual interests in popular culture and Kitsch.

When it came to planning La Menesunda, the two came up with their ideas on their first meetings, and quickly followed out their plan by gathering participants such as David Lamelas. During the early stages of this project, Santantonín and Minujin planned lists of various installments such swamp floors, a room full of objects that the spectator had to throw away in order to pass through, a room full of placards, changes of temperatures, and other outlandish proposals that revealed the artists collective imagination and focus on the senses of participants.

This was a natural project for him to be a part of, considering his ideas to focus on sensual and visual experiences. Visitors in groups of eight followed a series of neon lights thought through sixteen chambers. In each they encountered a different multi-sensory experience, including couples in bed, a cosmetics counter with an attendant, and a room covered with mirrors with falling confetti and the scent of frying food.

== Later career and death ==
However, while his name is credited to this exhibition, the reaction of the press attributed sole authorship of La Menesunda to Minujin, provoking him into an existential crisis. Due to this, Santantonín ended his career as an artist by closing his “painter-construction” phase. Shortly before his untimely death in April 1969, Santantonín lit a bonfire and burned almost all of his Arte-cosas artwork. This act of destruction has been interpreted as a gesture of despair prompted by his disappointment at the media’s reaction in his artistic work. Although at the time Santantonín felt like he had failed as an artist, this could be seen as a punishment through which he felt like society was not worth viewing his artwork in the future. Presently, because there are few remaining pieces, collectors, members of the art market, and various Latin institutions are searching in vain for what is left behind or hidden. As for now, there are less than ten pieces known to be left behind, and it is uncertain if any more than this number remain.

Santantonín act of destruction is often viewed as one of the many symbolic gestures signaling that the “adventure of the sixties” was coming to an end. Santantonín’s unconventional behavioral pattern that his noncommercial art conveyed contained traces that anticipated and encouraged the future Conceptual art movement.

== Remaining works ==
- La mordaza (The Gag), 1961, Private Collection, Buenos Aires
- Cosa (Thing), 1961, Daniel Sielecki collection, Buenos Aires
- Cosa II (Thing no. 2), 1962, Museo Nacional de Bellas Artes, Buenos Aires
- Cosa (Thing), 1963-1964, Museo Nacional de Bellas Artes, Buenos Aires
- Cosa (Thing), 1963-1964, Museo Nacional de Bellas Artes, Buenos Aires
- Aereo (Aerial), 1964, Museo de Ballas Artes Bonaerense, La Plata

== Exhibitions ==
Santantonín participated in the following exhibitions.

- 1958 - Asociacion Estimulo de Bellas Artes, Buenos Aires (solo)
- 1960 - Galeria Van Riel, Buenos Aires (solo)
- 1961 - Galeria Lirolay, Buenos Aires (solo)
- 1961 - Asociación Arte Nuevo, Salas Nacionales de Exposiciones, Buenos Aires (group)
- 1961 - Asociación Arte Nuevo, Museo de Arte Moderno, Buenos Aires (group)
- 1962 - (Collage - 13 Pintores) Galeria Lirolay, Buenos Aires (group)
- 1962/63 - (Ver Y Estimar) Museo Nacional de Bellas Artes, Buenos Aires (group)
- 1962 - El Hombre antes del Hombre, Galería Florida (under the auspices of the Museo de Arte Moderno) Buenos Aires (group)
- 1962 - Nuevos Nombres en el Arte Argentino, Embassy of the United States, Buenos Aires
- 1963 - Premio Instituto Torcuato Di Tella, Centro de Artes Visuales Del Instituto Torcuato Di Tella, Buenos Aires (group)
- 1963 - VII Bienal, São Paulo (group)
- 1963 - L’Art Argentin Actuel, Musée National d'Art Moderne, Paris (group)
- 1964 - Seis Artistas, Galería Lirolay, Buenos Aires (group)
