= Sommarnöje =

Watercolor painting by Anders Zorn

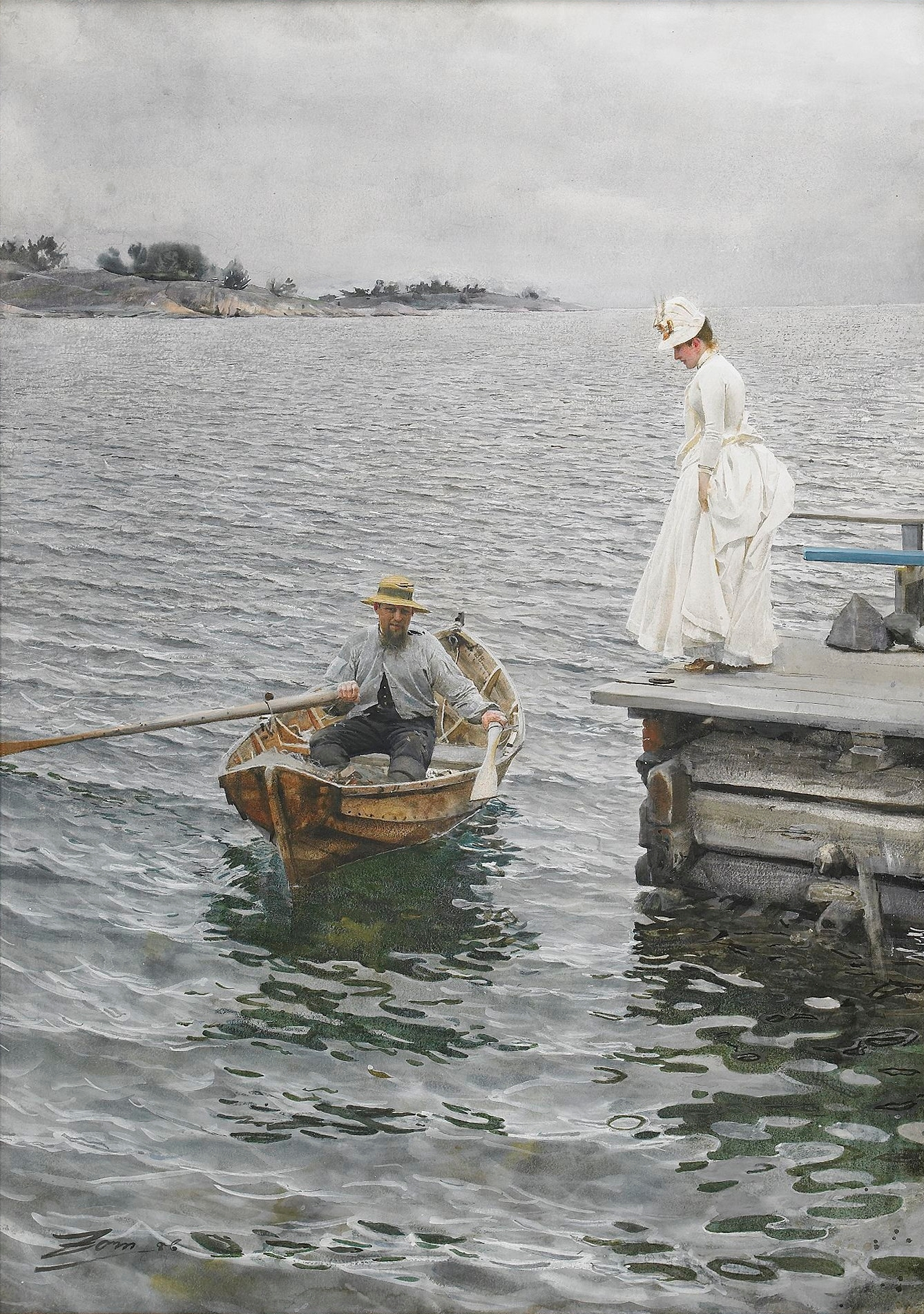
Anders Zorn, Sommarnöje, 1886, watercolour, 76 by 54 centimetres (30 in × 21 in)

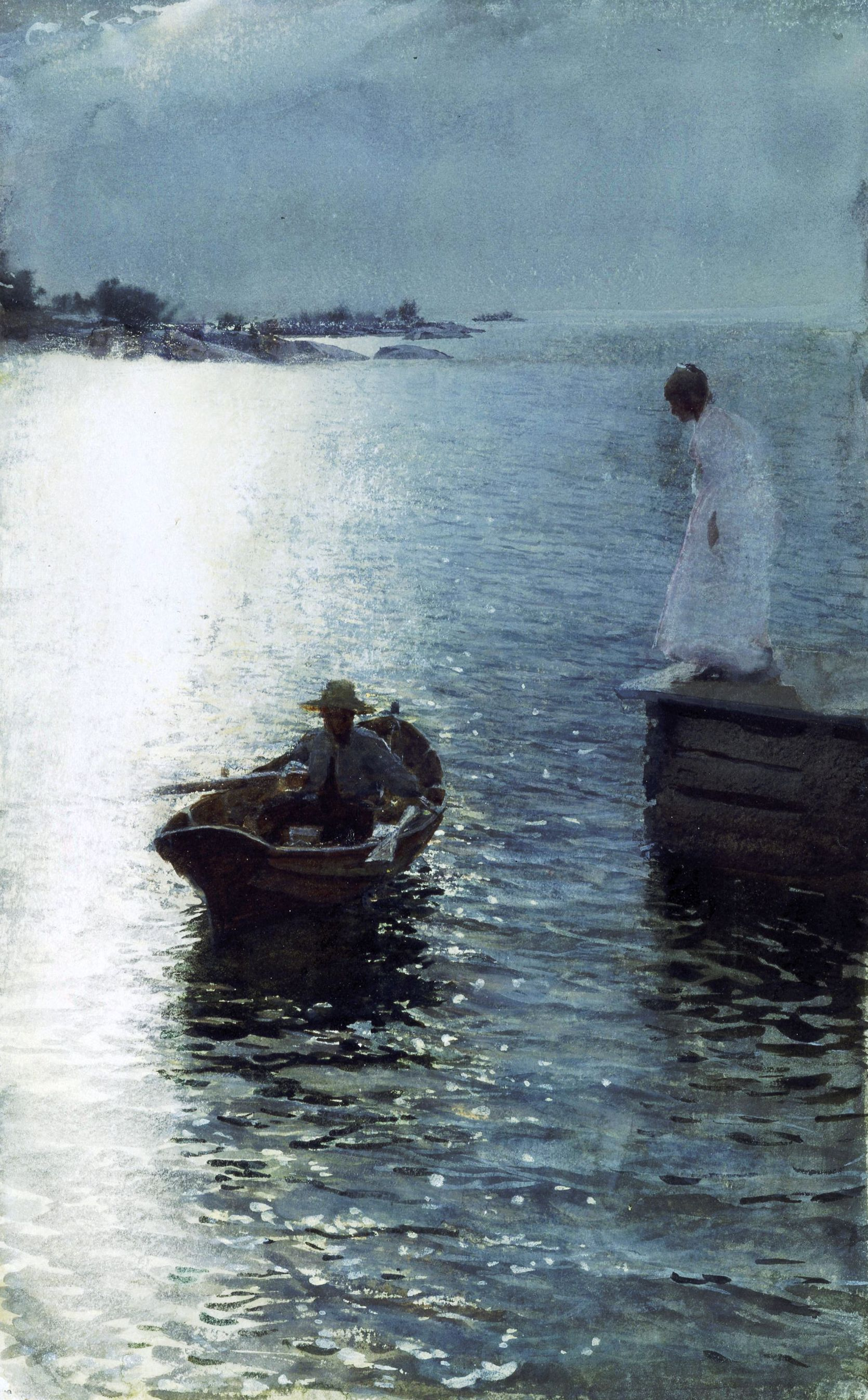
Sketch, 30.2 by 18.8 centimetres (11.9 in × 7.4 in)

Sommarnöje (Swedish for Summer Delight or Summertime Fun) is a watercolour painting by the Swedish painter Anders Zorn, made in 1886 at Dalarö near Stockholm. It was sold in 2010 for SEK 26 million (almost €2.9 million, or US$3.35 million), a record for a Swedish painting.

== Background ==
Zorn was born in Mora, Sweden, between the lakes of Siljan and Orsasjön. He studied at the Royal Swedish Academy of Arts in Stockholm from 1875 to 1880, and then spent time travelling in Europe, painting watercolours and society portraits in London, Paris and Madrid.

He returned to Sweden in 1885, and on 16 October, he married Emma Zorn (née Lamm) (1860 - 1942). After spending their honeymoon abroad, in eastern Europe and Turkey, they returned to Sweden in 1886, spending time with Emma's family at Dalarö, before settling near Mora, where their house, which is now the home of the Zorn Collections, is located.

== Description ==
Zorn painted Sommarnöje in Dalarö in the early summer of 1886, after the couple had returned from honeymoon but before they settled in Mora. He made a smaller sketch first, which measures 30.2 by 18.8 centimetres (11.9 in × 7.4 in), now held by the Zorn Museum in Mora.

The completed watercolour captures a fleeting moment, and shows influence from the works of the French Impressionists that Zorn had seen while in Paris, but with a distinctively austere Scandinavian palette.

The painting depicts the artist's wife Emma Zorn standing in a white dress and hat, waiting on the edge of a wooden pier beside the water, as their friend Carl Gustav Dahlström approaches in a rowing boat.

The reflective glassy surface of the water is rippling in a breeze, under cloudy grey skies. The figures, pier, boat and sea are finely rendered, almost as if the work was made in oil paint, showing Zorn's skill as a watercolourist. Less attention is paid to the other side of the lake, sketched roughly in the background. It is signed and dated in the lower left corner, "Zorn 86".

It was acquired by Edvard Levisson of Gothenburg, and then descended through the Schollin-Borg family. The painting was sold at the Stockholms Auktionsverk in June 2010 for SEK 26 million, setting a record for a Swedish painting. The previous record of SEK 22 million was set in 1990, for August Strindberg's 1892 oil painting Underlandet ("Wonderland").
