= Alexander Calandrelli =

German sculptor

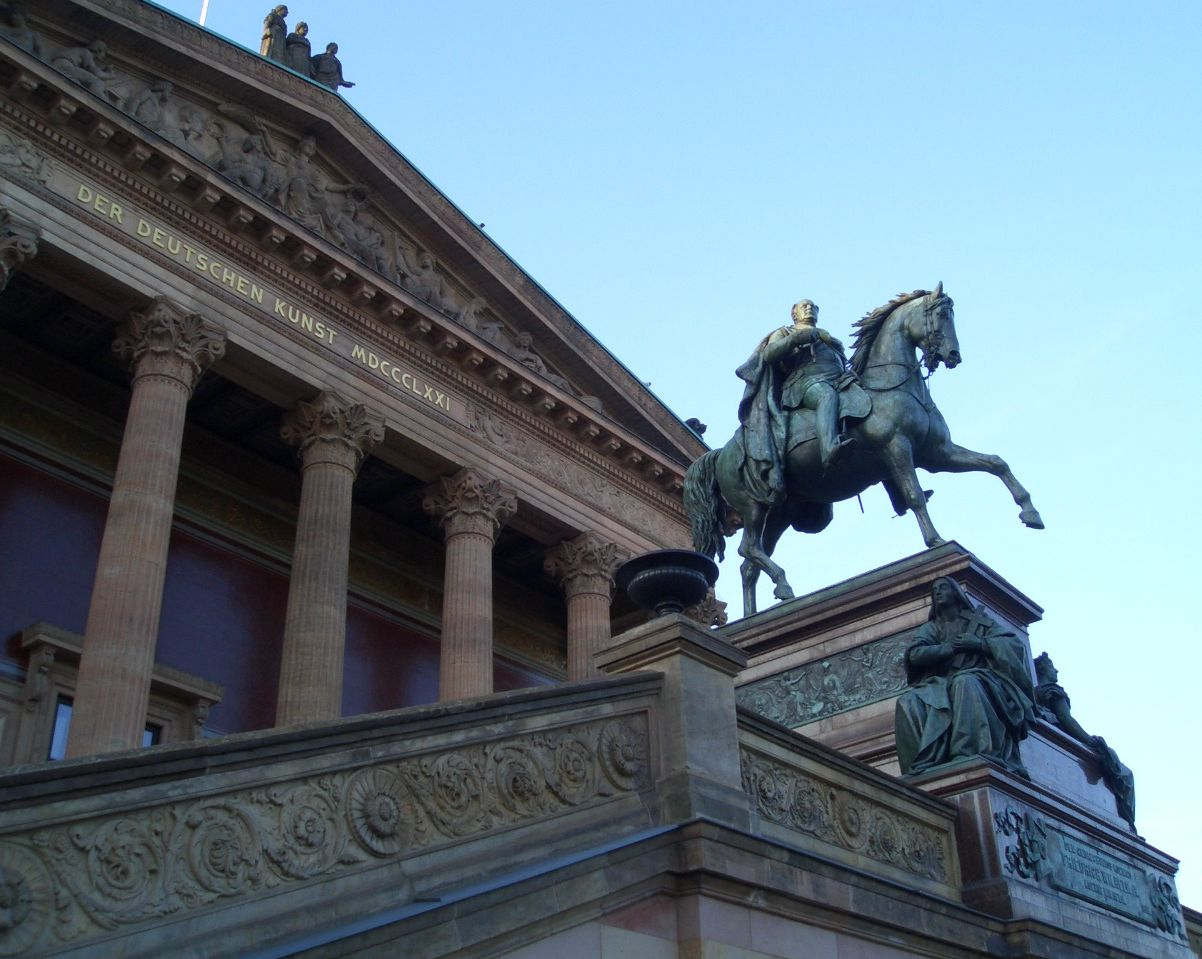
Equestrian statue of Frederick William IV by Calandrelli (pediment of the Alte Nationalgalerie in Berlin

Alexander Emil Ludovico Calandrelli (9 May 1834 – 26 May 1903) was a German sculptor of Italian descent.

== Life ==
Calandrelli was born in Berlin. His father was a gem-cutter from Rome who came to the Kingdom of Prussia in 1832. From 1847 to 1850 Alexander attended the Berliner Akademie der Künste, but had to cut short his studies due to financial problems, though he was still able to continue his training in the studios of August Wredow, Friedrich Wilhelm Dankberg (until 1852) and Friedrich Drake (until 1855). He then worked for August Fischer until 1863. From 1864 he ran his own studio. Small works in wax, a skill he had learned from Fischer, formed his transition to larger sculptures - his first major works were models for a silver table-centrepiece.

In 1874 Calandrelli was made professor of sculpture, in 1883 a member of the Akademie der Künste and in 1887 a Senate-member of the Akademie der Künste. From the 1870s onwards he was the favourite artist of the Prussian imperial court. His works' moderate classicism makes him a late representative of the 'Rauch school' within the 'Berlin School' of sculpture, whose influence declined hugely at the end of the 19th century. For still works with the accuracy required of great portraits, he was one of the best sculptors of his time.

His pupils included August Gaul and Martin Götze. He died in Berlin-Lankwitz, and he was buried in the state-owned Friedhof Wilmersdorf cemetery on Berliner Straße 81-103, but his grave seems to be lost. In Berlin-Lankwitz a street was named after him following the Second World War.

== Bibliography ==
- (in German) Peter Bloch, Waldemar Grzimek: Die Berliner Bildhauerschule im 19. Jahrhundert – Das klassische Berlin; Gebr. Mann Verlag Berlin 1978 (überarbeitete Auflage 1994)
- (in German) Peter Bloch, Sibylle Einholz, Jutta von Simson: Ethos & Pathos – Die Berliner Bildhauerschule 1786-1914; Katalog und Begleitband zur Ausstellung Berlin 1990
- (in German) Michael Puls: Gustav Hermann Bläser – Zum Leben und Werk eines Berliner Bildhauers; LETTER Stiftung Köln 1996
- (in German) Uta Lehnert: Der Kaiser und die Siegesallee; Dietrich Reimer Verlag Berlin 1998
- (in German) Bernhard Maaz (Hrsg.): Nationalgalerie Berlin – Das XIX. Jahrhundert – Bestandskatalog der Skulpturen; Verlag E. A. Seemann 2006
- (in German) Ortsverein Grünau e.v. (Hrsg.): Festschrift 250 Jahre Grünau; C. Presseagentur & Verlag GBR 1999
