= Bonaparte Before the Sphinx =

Painting by Jean-Léon Gérôme

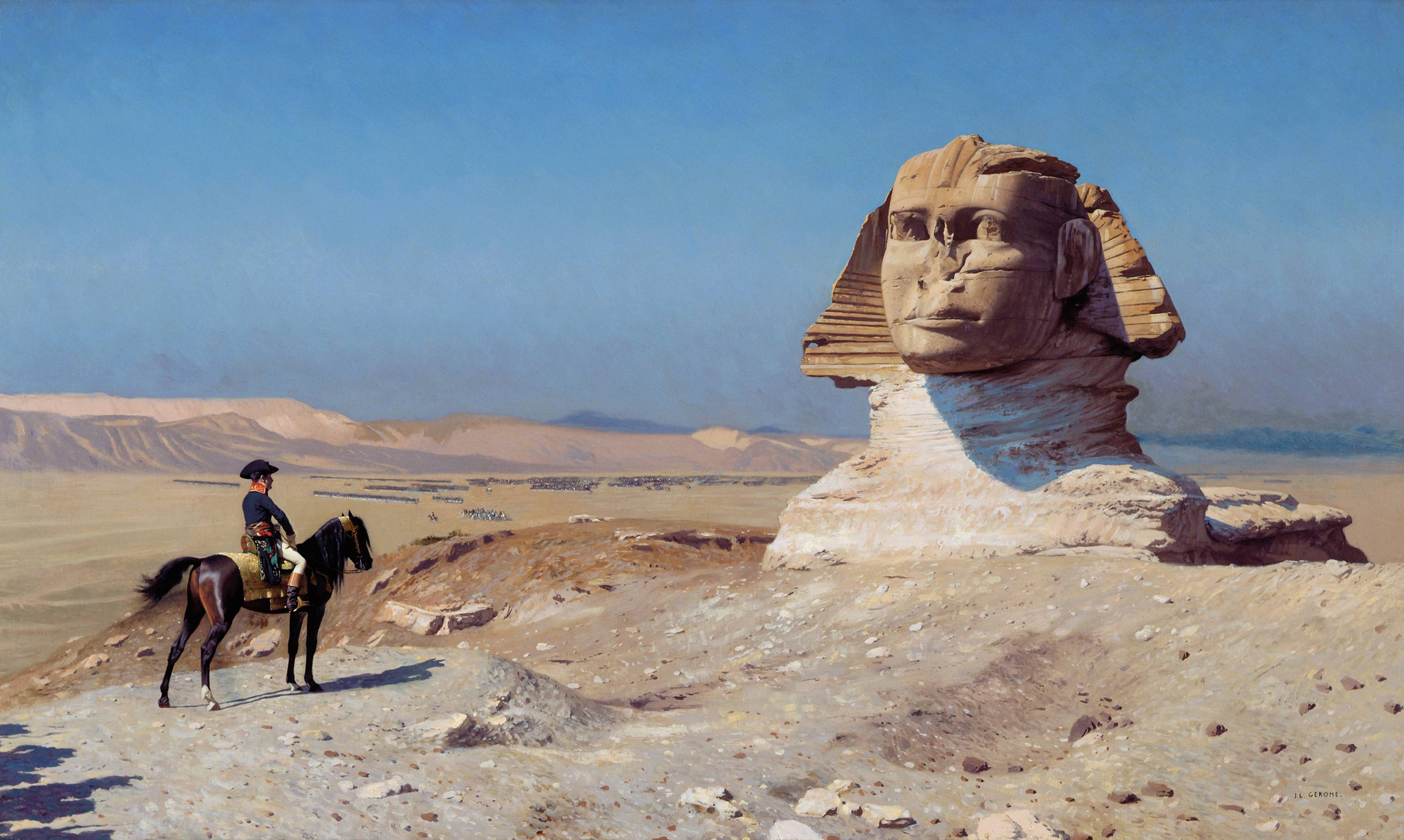
- Artist: Jean-Léon Gérôme
- Year: 1886
- Medium: Oil on canvas
- Dimensions: 61.6 cm × 101.9 cm (24.3 in × 40.1 in)
- Location: Hearst Castle, San Simeon, California

Bonaparte Before the Sphinx (French: Bonaparte devant le Sphinx) is an 1886 painting by the French artist Jean-Léon Gérôme. It is also known as Oedipus (Œdipe). It depicts Napoleon Bonaparte during his Egyptian campaign, positioned on horseback in front of the Great Sphinx of Giza, with his army in the background.

The painting was presented at the Salon of 1886 under the title Œdipe, evoking the myth of Oedipus and the Sphinx. It popularized Napoleon in front of the Sphinx as a subject in art and caricature. It is located at the Hearst Castle in California.

== Oedipus and the Sphinx ==
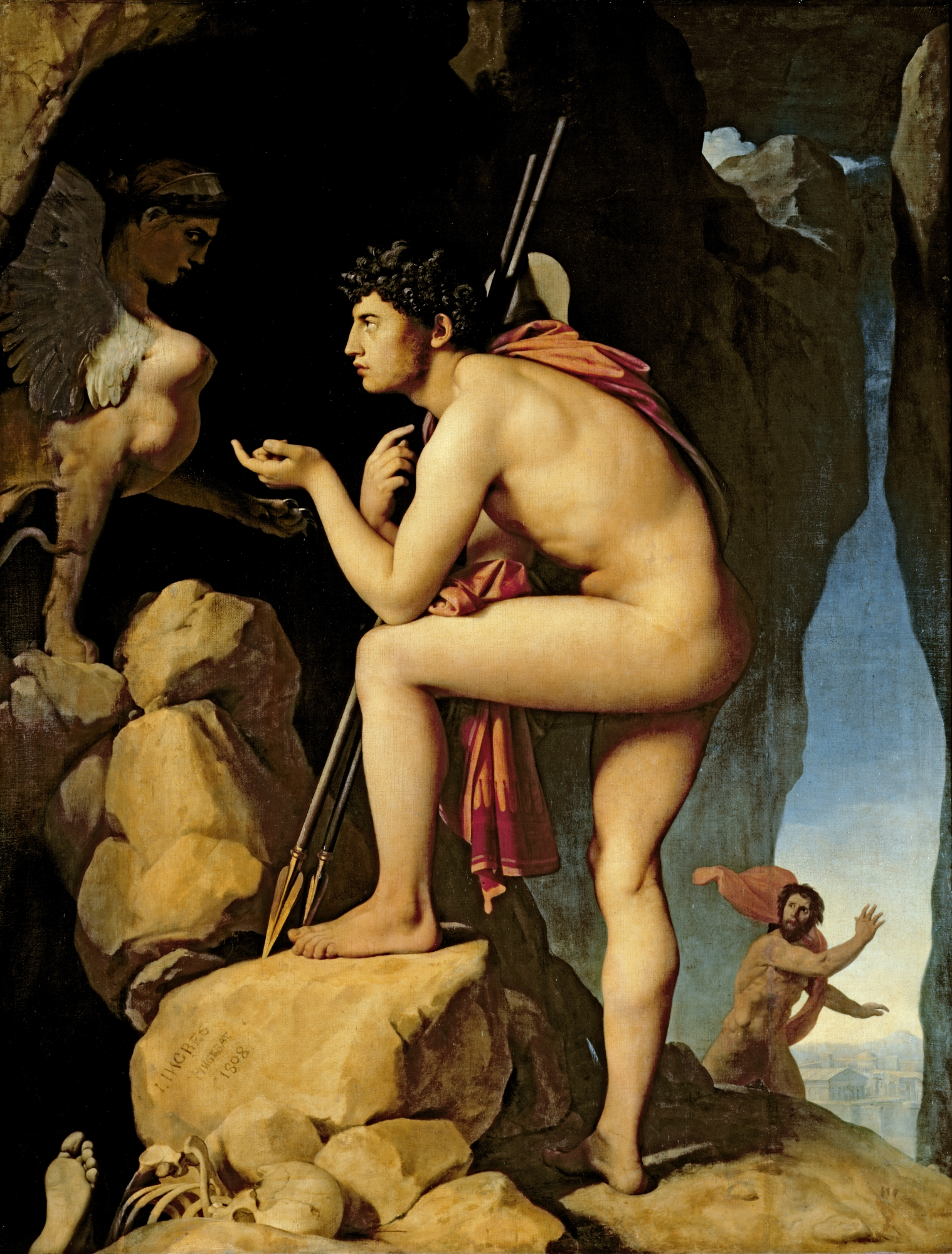
Ingres, Oedipus and the Sphinx, 1808, Louvre.

In titling his work Oedipus, Gérôme referenced both the ancient myth and its depiction by previous artists.

In the myth, all travelers on the road to Thebes must solve a riddle posed by the Sphinx, or die.

When the monster asked him: "What is it that has a voice and walks on four legs in the morning, on two at noon, and on three in the evening?" Oedipus answered that it was man, who as a child crawls on all fours, as an adult walks on two legs, and in old age uses a stick as a third leg.…The theme of [Ingres's] work is the triumph of intelligence and of human beauty. But the scene is also one of man confronting his destiny since Oedipus's exploit will lead to him becoming king of Thebes and marrying his mother Jocasta, as the oracle had predicted when he was born. It was a subject rarely portrayed from the end of the classical period until Ingres, but in the nineteenth century it came to fascinate many artists, most notably Gustave Moreau (1826-1898).

== Reception ==
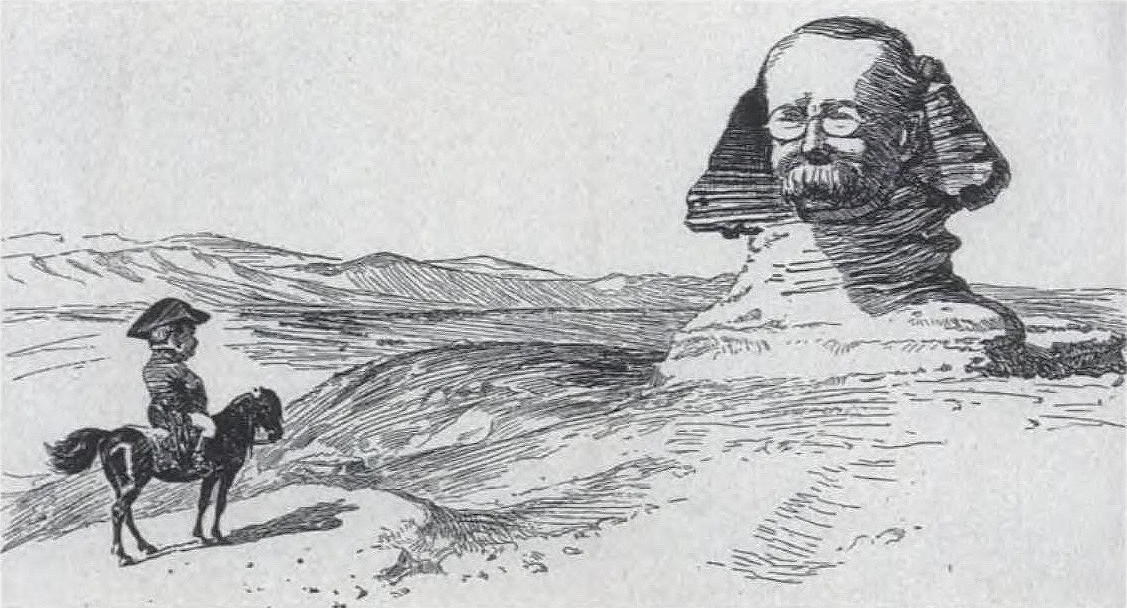
The fame of Gérôme's image is demonstrated by this cartoon from Life magazine (Feb. 27 1908), showing Teddy Roosevelt as the Sphinx.

Reviewing the Paris Salon of 1886,The New York Times wrote that Bonaparte Before the Sphinx was one of Gérôme's finest examples of his historical studies.

The young Corsican, seated on his horse, is gazing in meditation upon the enormous enigmatic face of stone, that strange memorial of titanic ambitions, of forgotten sovereigns, of a vanished race. ... The master has kept out all distracting details; even those I have mentioned are felt rather than observed, not even the Pyramids are shown – only the cloudless sky, the smooth sand, from whose drifts the gigantic visage rears itself and the solitary, self-communing man.

The painting would be acquired by an American billionaire, himself the stuff of legend:

Oedipus…imaginatively sets Napoleon in silent dialogue with the Sphinx, the young man of destiny confronted by the enigmatic gaze of a monument thousands of years old; intriguingly, this painting and its pendant, Bonaparte in Cairo, were to be bought by William Randolph Hearst in 1898.

== Gérôme's images of Napoleon in Egypt ==
In the 1860s, Gérôme painted pictures showing Napoleon during the Egyptian campaign of 1798-9. He returned to this theme in the 1880s, and with the sculpture Napoleon Entering Cairo, exhibited in the Paris Salon of 1897.

Gérôme was uniquely placed to depict this particular phase of Napoleon's career. He was already famous for his Egyptian genre subjects and landscapes, derived from extensive travel in the region from the mid-1850s onwards.

Gérôme’s Napoleonic subjects evoke the notion of destiny; in each of the paintings, Napoleon is shown deep in thought, a striking contrast to conventional military subject paintings depicting specific incidents in a campaign, or heroism in the heat of battle. In Napoleon in Egypt (1863), the young general is shown on his own, set apart from his waiting groom, deep in contemplation.

Napoleon and His General Staff in Egypt (c. 1867) portrays the extreme conditions faced by Napoleon and his army during their short and ill-fated Egyptian campaign. Gérôme's friend Frédéric Masson, who had travelled with him in Egypt and who became a respected biographer of Napoleon, described this painting, noting

the hot breath of the wind...the heat and the burning sand which blinds the officers of his staff...the golden mist raised by the Khamsinn...the frightful lassitude which takes possession of the best trained men save those who have compelled the body to be the docile slave of the mind.…[Napoleon] hesitates between the two halves of the world which he holds in his hands; he ponders upon the fate of Alexander, of Caesar....unconscious of suffering, his dream embraces the universe!

Bonaparte in Cairo, described as a pendant to Bonaparte Before the Sphinx, may have been painted at the same time; the paintings are the same size and were sold together to Hearst. Seen side by side, they offer a study in contrasts, as Bonaparte gazes up at the mysterious Sphinx and down upon the conquered city of Cairo.

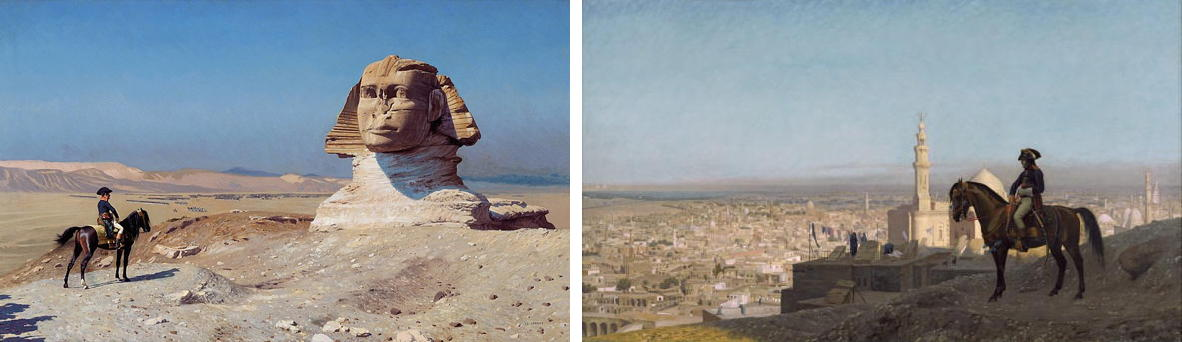
Pendant paintings of Napoleon in Egypt at Hearst Castle: Bonaparte Before the Sphinx and Bonaparte in Cairo.

The 1897 sculpture of the young Bonaparte making his 1798 entry into Cairo was the first in a series of historical equestrian figures Gérôme produced during the late 1890s, including Washington, Frederick the Great, Caesar, and Tamerlane. Of the Napoleon statute, a contemporary Salon critic, the sculptor René de Saint-Marceaux, wrote that never before had Gérôme "so brilliantly displayed, as a sculptor, his usual qualities of skilled, refined taste." The original Salon version was bought by the French state for the Luxembourg and, unusually for a purchased unique work, was subsequently reproduced in three sizes by Siot-Decauville. The foundry executed some of these reproductions in cold painted polychromy.

== Gallery ==
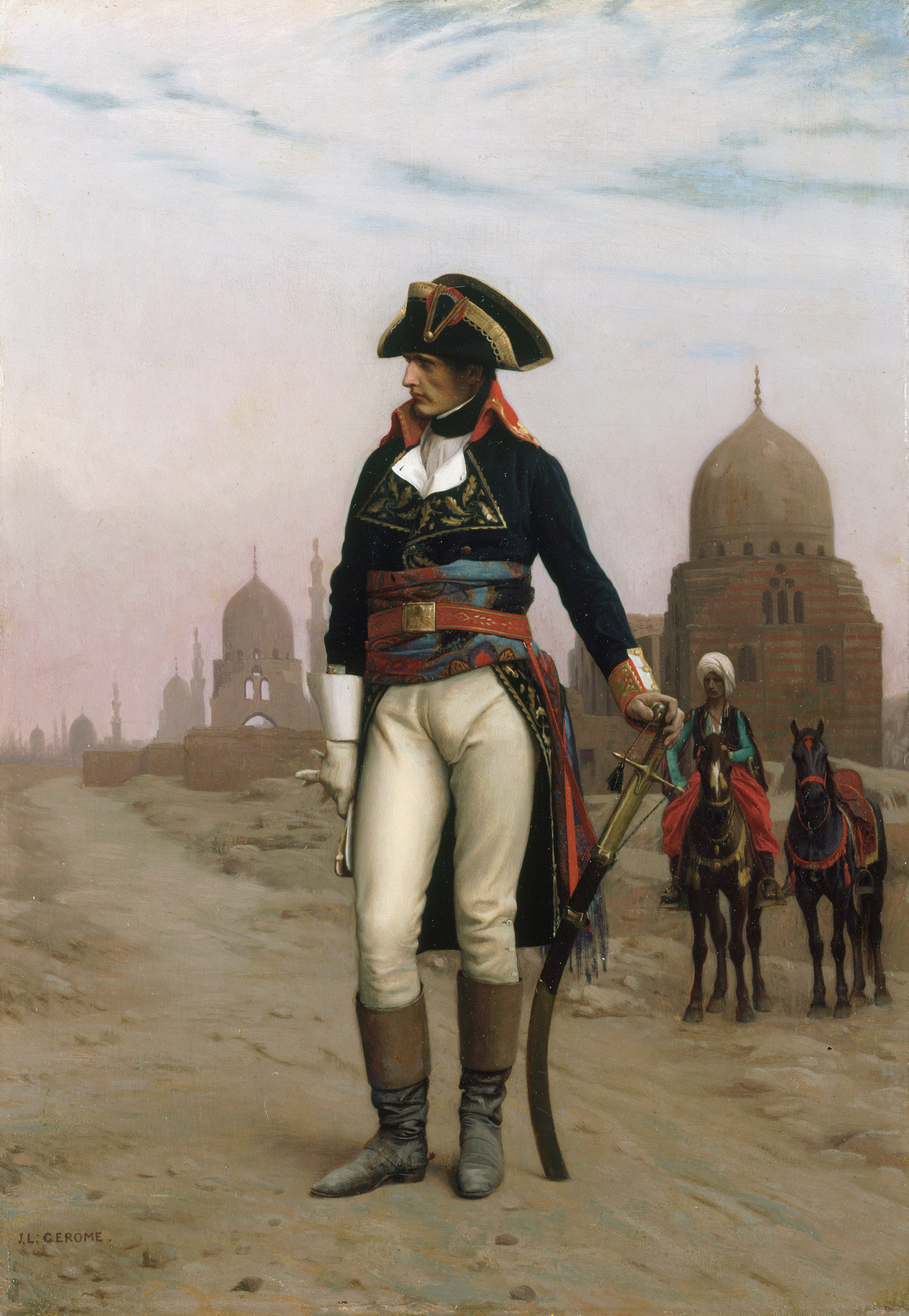
Napoleon in Egypt, c. 1863, Princeton University Art Museum

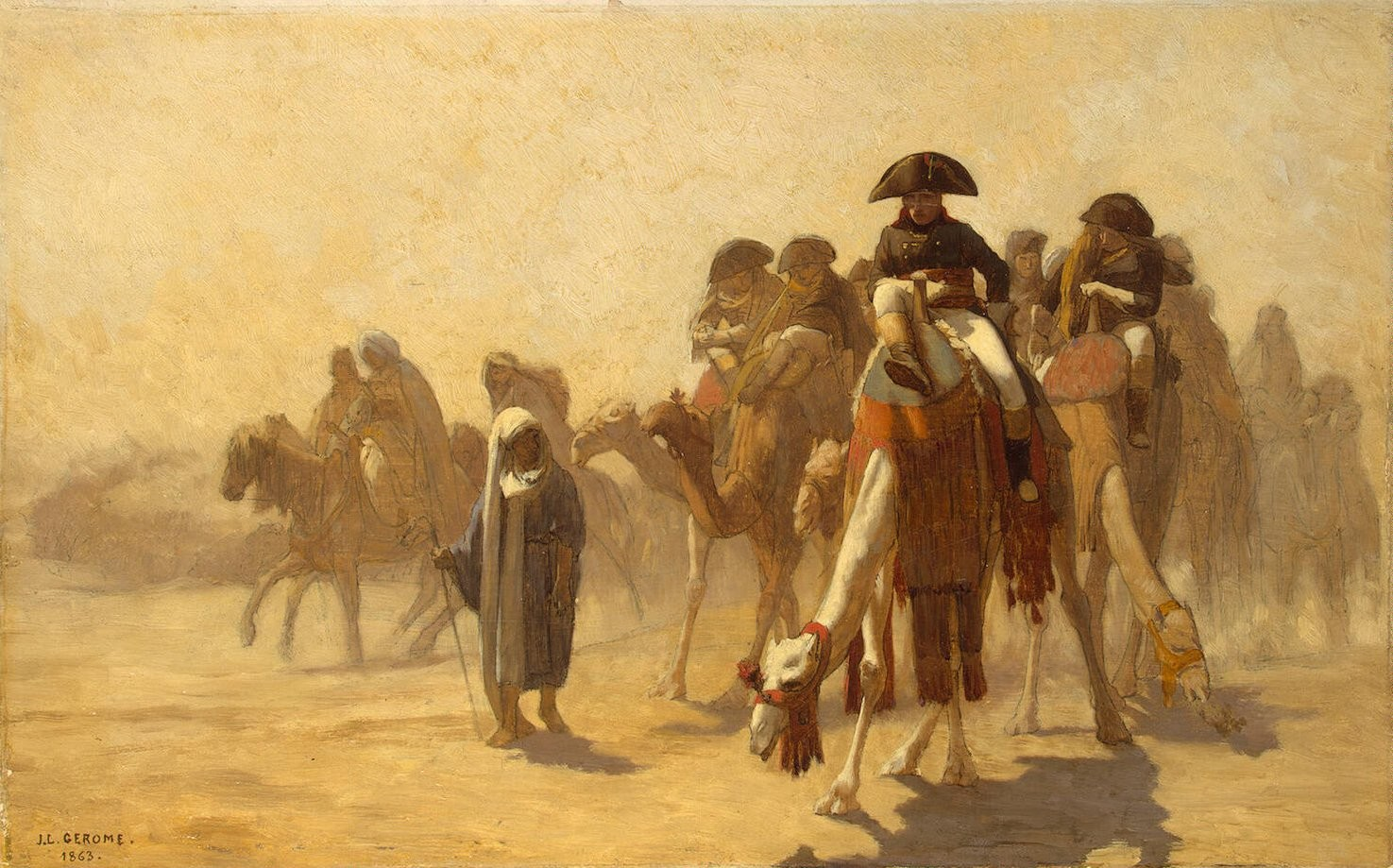
Napoleon and his General Staff in Egypt (oil sketch), 1863, Hermitage Museum

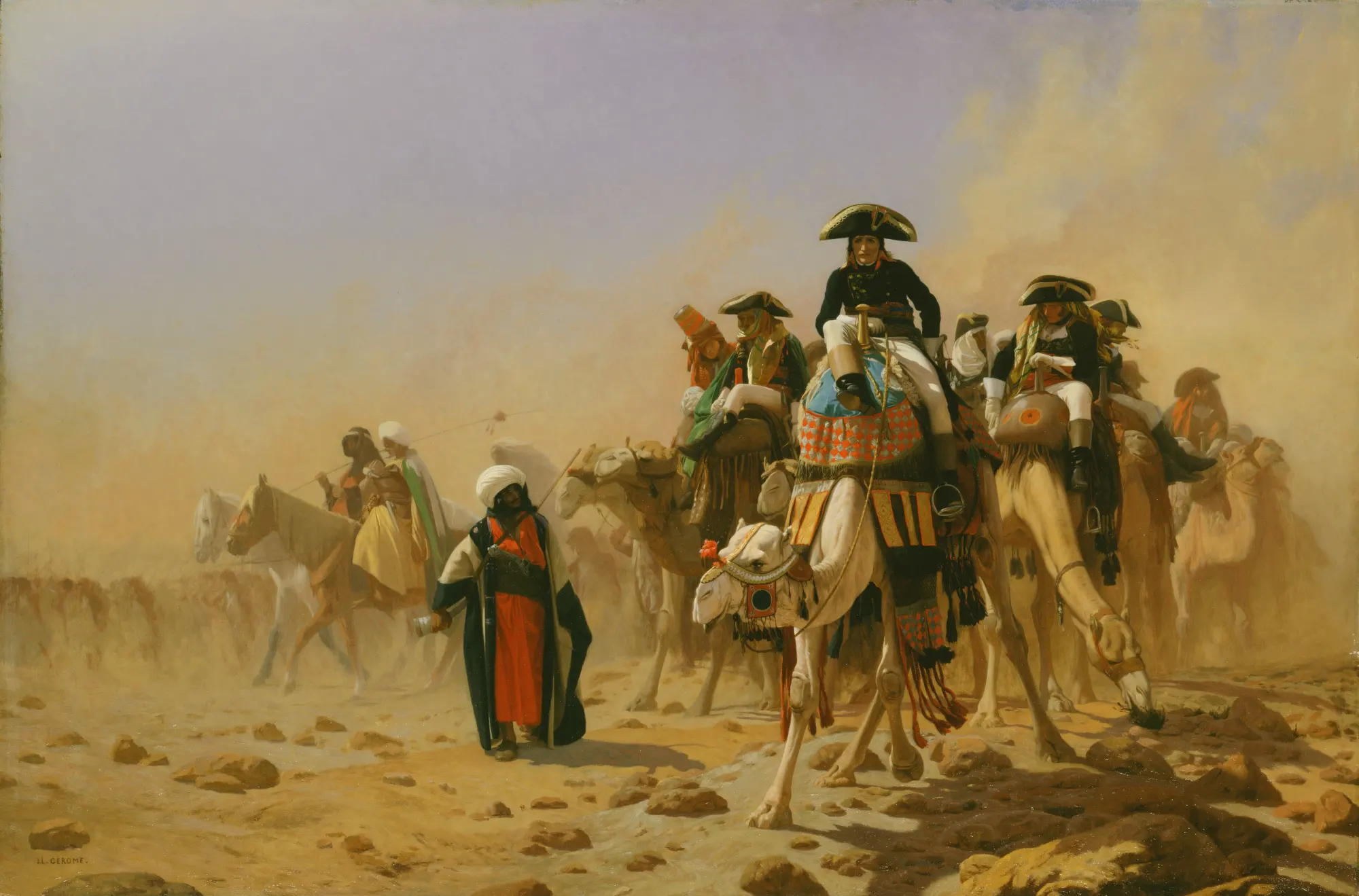
Napoleon and his General Staff in Egypt, c. 1867, private collection

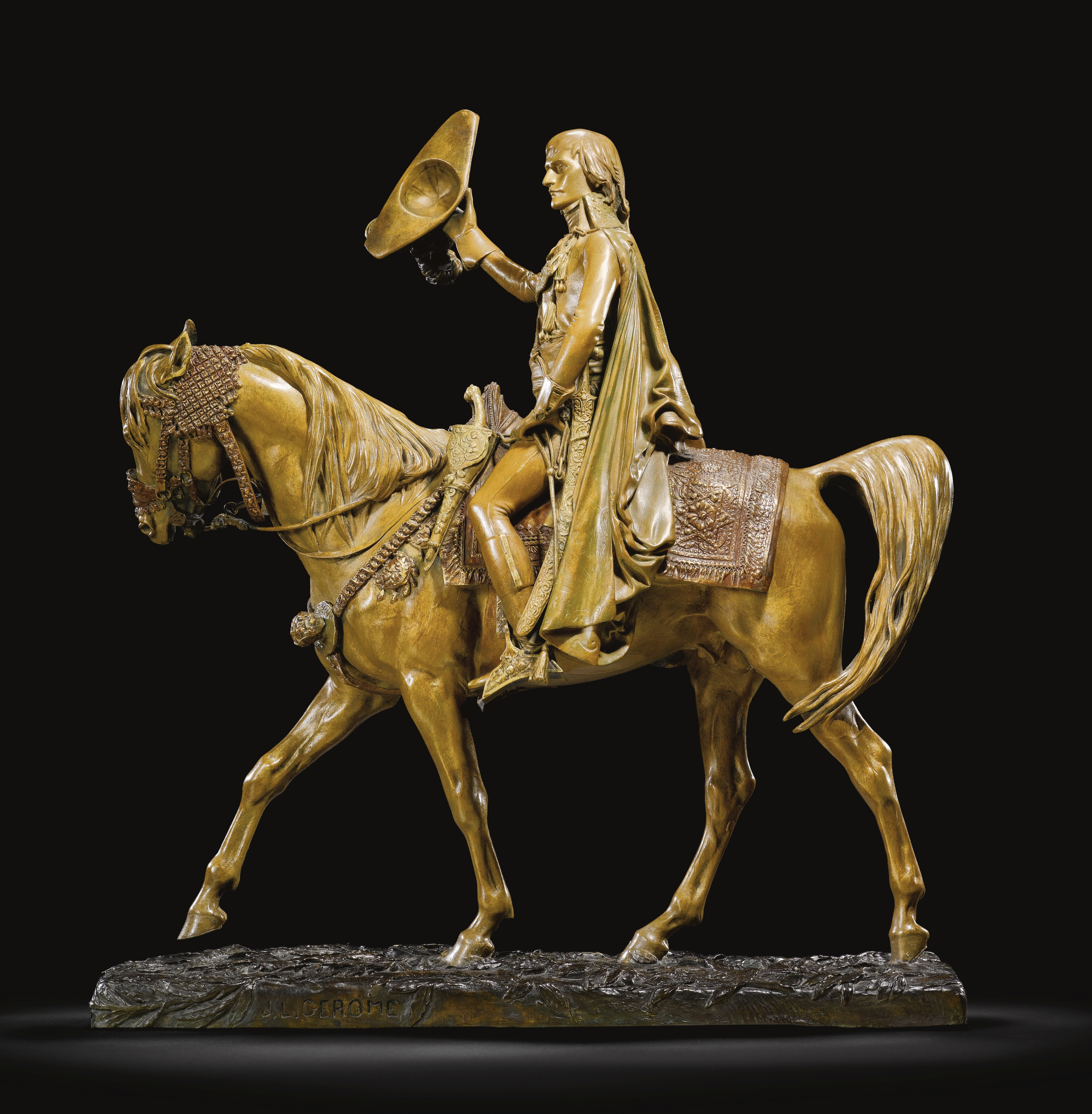
Napoleon Entering Cairo, bronze, after 1897
