= Wilhelm Gimmi =

Wilhelm Gimmi (7 August 1886 – 29 August 1965) was a Swiss painter, lithographer, and designer.

== Life and work ==
Wilhelm Gimmi was born in Zurich as the son of a federal civil servant. At the Küsnacht Teachers' Seminary, he trained to become a primary school teacher. Subsequently, he taught for one year as a substitute teacher at the secondary school in Wädenswil.

A scholarship enabled Gimmi to study at the Académie Julian in Paris from 1908 to 1911. In the interim, he returned to Switzerland and participated in the exhibitions of the artists' association Der Moderne Bund from 1911 to 1913. Gimmi had founded this group in Weggis in 1911, together with his fellow painters Hans Arp, Walter Helbig, Oscar Lüthy, and Fritz Huf. Hans Arp and Hermann Huber participated in the first exhibition at the Hotel du Lac in Lucerne, held from 3 to 17 December 1911, alongside the already renowned Pablo Picasso, Paul Gauguin, Cuno Amiet, Othon Friesz, Ferdinand Hodler, Wassily Kandinsky, and Henri Matisse.

Gimmi lived in Paris from 1911 to 1940. He first came to public attention in 1919, when he was able to exhibit ten works at the gallery of Berthe Weill. From 1920 onwards, he was a member of the Salon d’Automne and exhibited in several Parisian galleries. In 1934, he married Cécile Abramsky. Gimmi was also an art collector, acquiring works by artists such as Nicolas Poussin. However, he was forced to leave his art collection—along with many of his own works—behind in Paris when, due to the Second World War, he fled to Switzerland with his wife in 1940 and settled in Chexbres.

Together with his friend Ernst Suter, he was a frequent guest of John Friedrich Vuilleumier and met often with his fellow artist Charles Häusermann (1886–1938). Throughout these years, Gimmi participated in the most significant Swiss art exhibitions. Commissioned by the City of Zurich, he created murals for the Muraltengut and for ETH Zurich.

In 1942, Gimmi received the Grand Prix de l’illustration from the publishing house of Albert Skira for his illustrations for an edition of Gottfried Keller’s Romeo und Julia auf dem Dorfe. In the winter of 1956–1957, his works were featured in a comprehensive exhibition at the Kunsthaus Zürich. In 1962, Gimmi received the City of Zurich's Prize for Fine Arts.

Gimmi died in 1965 in Chexbres. In 1968, the Musée Jenisch in Vevey dedicated a retrospective to him, followed in 1978 by a catalogue raisonné of his paintings.

== Bibliography ==
- Tapan Bhattacharya: "Wilhelm Gimmi " in German, French and Italian in the online Historical Dictionary of Switzerland, 2005.
- Georges Peillex, Alfred Scheidegger: Wilhelm Gimmi. Orell Füssli, Zürich 1972, ISBN 978-3-28000009-0.
- Georges Peillex: Wilhelm Gimmi. Catalogue raisonné des peintures. Orell Füssli, Zürich 1977.
- Wilhelm Sulser: Über den Maler Wilhelm Gimmi. In: Thurgauer Jahrbuch. 25. Jg., 1950, S. 17–21 (Digitalisat).
