= Marta Minujín =

Argentine artist (born 1943)

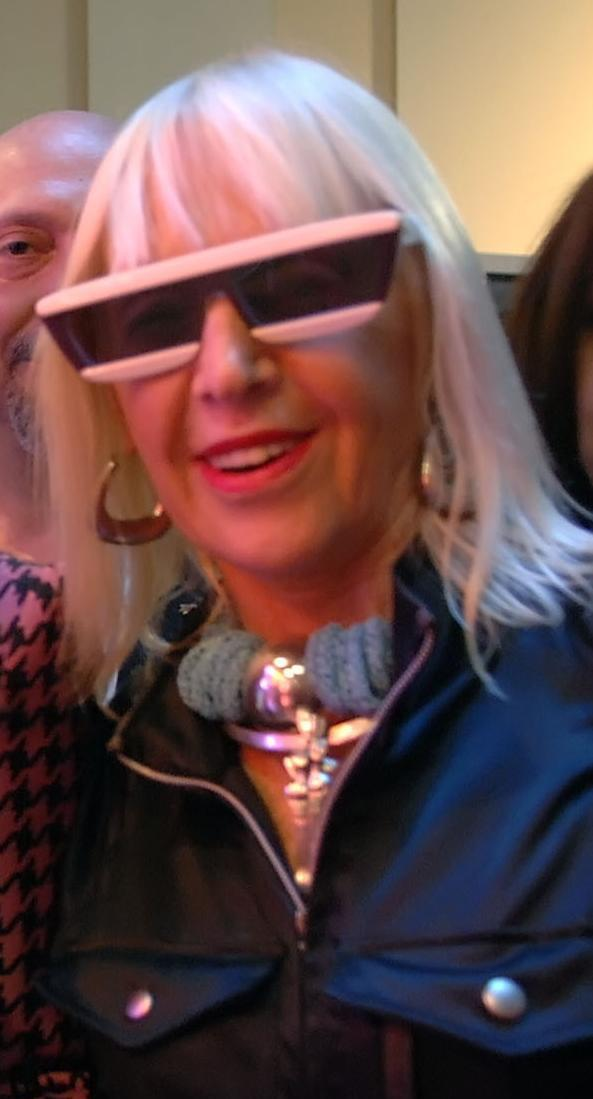
- Marta Minujín in 2008.
- Born: 30 January 1943 (age 83); Buenos Aires, Argentina
- Known for: Painting, sculpture, performance, happening, drawing
- Movement: Action art; Conceptual art; Pop art; Psychedelic art; Avant-garde; Informalism
- Spouse: Juan Carlos Gómez Sabaini (m. 1957)
- Relatives: Juan Minujín (Nephew)
- Awards: Platinum Konex Award (1982 and 2002)

Marta Minujín (born 1943) is an Argentine conceptual and performance artist.

== Life and work ==
Signature.

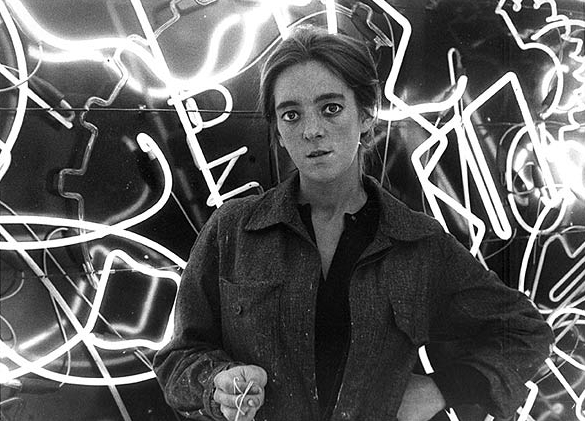
Minujín inside La Menesunda, a 1965 exhibition.

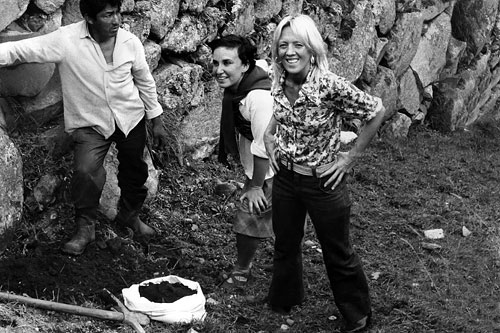
Communicating with Earth, late 1970s.

Marta Minujín was born in the San Telmo neighborhood of Buenos Aires. Her father was a Jewish physician and her mother a housewife of Spanish descent. She met a young economist, Juan Carlos Gómez Sabaini, and married him in secret in 1959; the couple had two children. As a student in the National University Art Institute, she first exhibited her work in a 1959 show at the Teatro Agón. A scholarship from the National Arts Foundation allowed her to travel to Paris as one of the young Argentine artists featured in Pablo Curatella Manes and Thirty Argentines of the New Generation, a 1960 exhibit organized by the prominent sculptor and Paris Biennale judge.

While in Paris, Minujín was inspired by the experimental work of the Nouveaux Realistes, and especially their transformation of art into life. In response to this idea, Minujín staged an exhibition in 1962 during which she publicly burned her paintings. Her time in Paris also inspired her to create "livable sculptures," notably La Destrucción, in which she assembled mattresses along the Impasse Roussin, only to invite other avant-garde artists in her entourage, including Christo and Paul-Armand Gette, to destroy the display. This 1963 creation would be one of her first "Happenings" – events as works of arts in themselves; among her hosts during her stay was Finance Minister Valéry Giscard d'Estaing (later President of France).

She earned a National Award in 1964 at Buenos Aires' Torcuato di Tella Institute, where she prepared two happenings: Eróticos en technicolor and the interactive Revuélquese y viva (Roll Around in Bed and Live). Her Cabalgata (Cavalcade) aired on Public Television that year, and involved horses with paint buckets tied to their tails. These displays took her to nearby Montevideo, where she organized Sucesos (Events) at the Uruguayan capital's Tróccoli Stadium with 500 chickens, artists of contrasting physical shape, motorcycles, and other elements.

She joined Rubén Santantonín at the di Tella Institute in 1965 to create La Menesunda (Mayhem), where participants were asked to go through sixteen chambers, each separated by a human-shaped entry. Led by neon lights, groups of eight visitors would encounter rooms with television sets at full blast, couples making love in bed, a cosmetics counter (complete with an attendant), a dental office from which dialing an oversized rotary phone was required to leave, a walk-in freezer with dangling fabrics (suggesting sides of beef), and a mirrored room with black lighting, falling confetti, and the scent of frying food. The use of advertising throughout suggested the influence of pop art in Minujín's "mayhem."

These works earned her a Guggenheim Fellowship in 1966, by which she relocated to New York City. The coup d'état by General Juan Carlos Onganía in June of that year made her fellowship all the more fortuitous, as the new regime would frequently censor and ban irreverent displays such as hers. Minujín delved into psychedelic art in New York, of which among her best-known creations was that of the "Minuphone," where patrons could enter a telephone booth, dial a number, and be surprised by colors projecting from the glass panels, sounds, and seeing themselves on a television screen in the floor. The Minuphone was designed and constructed, in collaboration with her, by engineer Per Biorn, who was employed at Bell Telephone Laboratories, and the work was shown at the Howard Wise Gallery in New York City. She was on hand in 1971 for the Buenos Aires premiere of Operación Perfume, and in New York, befriended fellow conceptual artist Andy Warhol. Her image is included in the iconic 1972 poster Some Living American Women Artists by Mary Beth Edelson.

She returned to Argentina in 1976, and afterwards created a series of reproductions of classical Greek sculptures in plaster of paris, as well as miniatures of the Buenos Aires Obelisk carved out of panettone, of the Venus de Milo carved from cheese, and of Tango vocalist Carlos Gardel for a 1981 display in Medellín. The latter, a sheet metal creation, was stuffed with cotton and lit, creating a metaphor for the legendary crooner's untimely 1935 death in a Medellín plane crash. She was awarded the first of a series of Konex Awards, the highest in the Argentine cultural realm, in 1982. She also created a conceptual proposal for Manhattan based on a prone replica of the Statue of Liberty re-imagined as a public park.

Minujín returned to Buenos Aires in 1983, and the return of democracy the same year, following seven years of a generally failed dictatorship, prompted her to create a monument to a glaring, inanimate victim of the regime: freedom of expression. Assembling 30,000 books banned between 1976 and 1983 (including works as diverse as those by Freud, Marx, Sartre, Gramsci, Foucault, Raúl Scalabrini Ortiz, and Darcy Ribeiro, as well as satires such as Absalom and Achitophel, reference volumes such as Enciclopedia Salvat, and even children's texts, notably The Little Prince by Antoine de Saint-Exupéry), she designed the "Parthenon of Books [Homage to Democracy]." Following President Raúl Alfonsín's 10 December inaugural, Minujín had this temple-like structure mounted on a boulevard median along the Ninth of July Avenue. Dismantled after three weeks, its mass of newly unbanned titles was distributed to the public below and given back to their owners, symbolically putting the tools for rebuilding a free society back in the hands of the people.

A conversation with Warhol in New York regarding the Latin American debt crisis inspired one of her most publicized "happenings:" The Debt. Purchasing a shipment of maize, Minujín dramatized the Argentine cost of servicing the foreign debt with a 1985 photo series in which she symbolically handed the maize to Warhol "in payment" for the debt; she never again saw Warhol, who died in 1987.

In 2017, Minujín went on to make a second Parthenon of Banned Books in Kassel, Germany. Arranging 100,000 banned books into a replica of the Parthenon in Athens, Minujín honors those books that were censored and subsequently burned by the Nazis in the 1930s and 1940s. Similarly to the 1983 Parthenon, the books were distributed to people around the world when the work was dismantled.

In 2021 Minujín was responsible for making a half-size horizontal replica called Big Ben Lying Down of London's iconic Elizabeth Tower (often called "Big Ben" after its Great Bell), to be exhibited from 1-18 July in Piccadilly Gardens, Manchester, England made of books representing British politics. As with similar works, it was to be destroyed after the show by inviting visitors to take a book. She herself was unable to travel to Britain due to COVID-19 travel restrictions.

Minujín has continued to display her art pieces and happenings in the Buenos Aires Museum of Modern Art, the National Fine Arts Museum, the ArteBA contemporary art festival Buenos Aires, the Barbican Center, and a vast number of other international galleries and art shows, while continuing to satirize consumer culture (particularly relating to women). In 2023 her work was included in the exhibition Action, Gesture, Paint: Women Artists and Global Abstraction 1940-1970 at the Whitechapel Gallery in London.

In 2023-2024, the Jewsih Museum in New York presented Marta Minujín: Arte! Arte! Arte!, the first survey exhibitiom of Minujín's work in the United States. Held from November 17th, 2023, to April 1st, 2024, the exhibition included nearly 100 works spanning six decades of her career, including soft sculptures, large-scale paintings, drawings, performances, and documentation of ephemeral works and participatory installations. The exhibition was accompanied by Sculpture of Dreams, a 16-piece inflatable public installation presented in Times Square from November 8 to 21, 2023, which was Minujín's first public sculpture in New York City.

She is well known for her belief that "everything is art."

== Gallery ==
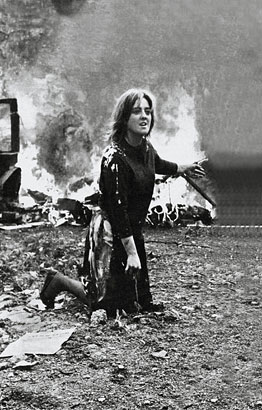
The Destruction (1963). Minujín's colleagues and friends collectively destroyed her works.

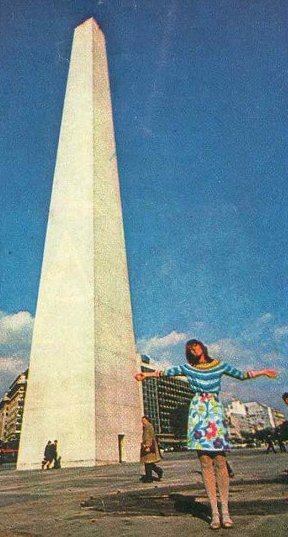
Sweet Obelisk (1965). Minujín covered the Obelisk of Buenos Aires with ice cream, and three colleagues licked it.

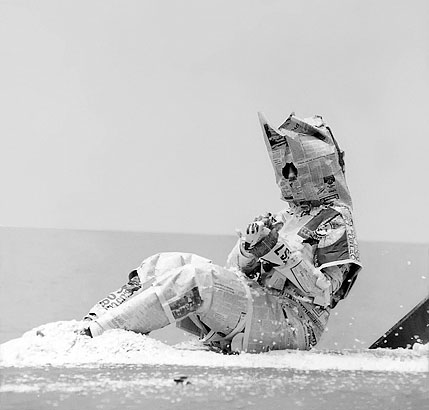
Reading the News (1965). Minujín got into the Río de la Plata covered in newspapers.

Minuphone (1967). Patrons could enter a telephone booth, dial a number, and be surprised by different effects.

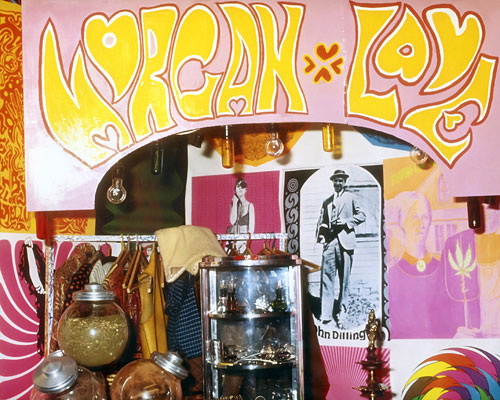
Importación/Exportación (1968).

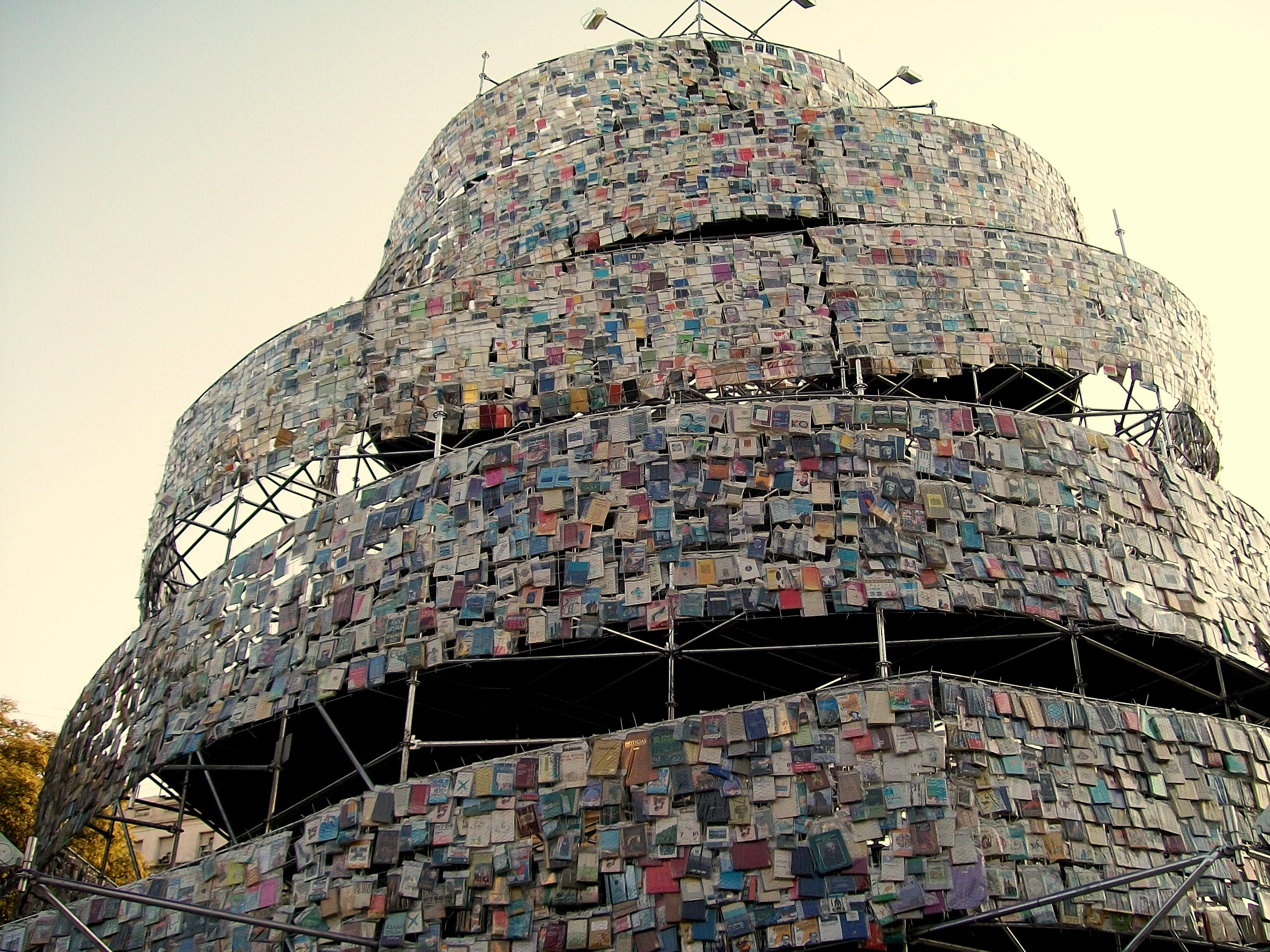
Babel Tower of books in Buenos Aires.
