= Jorge Romero Brest =

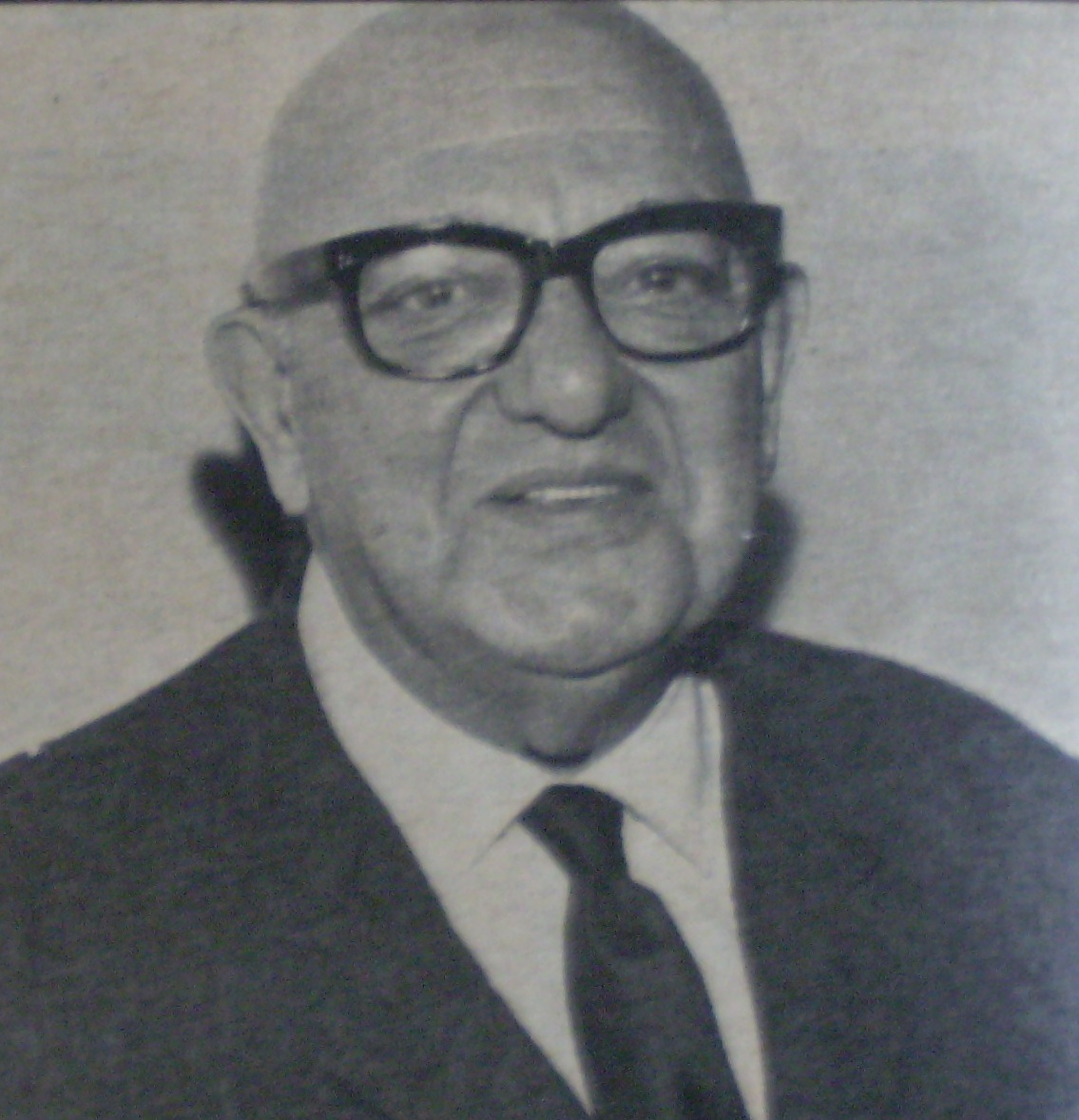
- Born: October 2, 1905; Buenos Aires, Argentina
- Died: February 12, 1989 (aged 83); Buenos Aires, Argentina
- Education: University of Buenos Aires
- Occupations: Art critic and curator
- Writing career
- Language: Spanish
- Genre: Avant-garde
- Website: www.archivoromerobrest.com.ar

Jorge Aníbal Romero Brest (October 2, 1905 – February 12, 1989) was an Argentine art critic in Argentina. He helped to popularize avant-garde art across Argentina.

== Life and work ==
Jorge Romero Brest was born in Buenos Aires on October 2, 1905. His father, Enrique Romero Brest, established the National Institute of Physical Education in Argentina. Jorge Brest began writing for his father's sports magazine, Revista de Educación Física. His research for these articles familiarized him with André Dunoyer de Segonzac's illustrations on the subject, and he developed an intellectual interest in art. He enrolled at the University of Buenos Aires in 1926, earned a law degree in 1933, and married Amelia Rossi.

His interest in art theory as a hobby resulted in his first book, El problema del arte y del artista contemporáneos (The Problems of Contemporary Art and Artists), in 1937. Brest was a talented speaker, and first gained renown as an art critic and commentator in a 1943 conference entitled "The element of rhythm in film and sports." He wrote columns on the philosophy of sport for the socialist newspaper La Vanguardia at the invitation of its editor, Mario Bravo, in 1939 and 1940.

Romero Brest became known as a confrontational art critic, and was initially disdainful of Surrealism in art, writing highly critical reviews of an exhibit by Orion Group painter Luis Barragán and others, recommending they first "learn to paint". He then published a biography of the renowned Argentine Realist painter Prilidiano Pueyrredón, in 1942, and a study of Michelangelo's famed David, in 1943. He published the first two volumes of his History of Art in 1945, publishing the third and fourth in 1946 and 1958, respectively. This latter work was subsequently used as a textbook in several Latin American universities.

The affiliation of many in the arts with the Socialist Party led to harassment by government officials, particularly by the populist president Juan Perón. In 1947, Perón ordered the Altamira Art Academy dissolved, leaving painters Emilio Pettoruti and Raúl Soldi, sculptor Lucio Fontana, and Romero Brest, who served as the academy's art history professor, among others, without a teaching post. Brest continued an active schedule of conferences and workshops, and founded the arts review journal Ver y Estimar (Look and Consider). He taught a course in Aesthetics and Art History at the Fray Mocho bookstore, and drew large numbers of students. His 1952 text, La pintura europea contemporánea (Contemporary Painting in Europe), was a success, and a series of international seminars followed.

The military dictatorship that overthrew Perón in 1955 named Brest director of the National Museum of Fine Arts. Both the museum and its collections were modernized and expanded during his tenure as director. A temporary exhibits pavilion was opened in 1961, and the museum acquired a large volume of modern art though its collaboration with the Torcuato di Tella Institute, a leading promoter of local avant-garde artists.

Among the artists whose work Brest introduced to the museum were Raúl Soldi, Héctor Basaldúa, Guillermo Butler, Lino Enea Spilimbergo, Emilio Pettoruti, and Ramón Gómez Cornet, as well as painters from the same Orion Group whose work he lampooned in the 1940s. He organized the museum's first Abstract Art exposition in 1960, showing works by Sarah Grilo, José Antonio Fernández Muro, Octavio Ocampo, Kazuya Sakai, and Clorindo Testa, and its first exhibit of Neo-figurative art in 1963, with works by Jorge de la Vega, Luis Felipe Noé, Ernesto Deira, and Rómulo Macció, known among local art circles as the "four horsemen of the apocalypse".

Brest resigned from his post at the National Fine Arts Museum in 1963, and was named director of the Center for Visual Arts at the Torcuato di Tella Institute. The institute then became the leading Argentine center for pop art, experimental theatre, and conceptual art, drawing artists such as León Ferrari, Nacha Guevara, Gyula Kosice, Nicolás García Uriburu, and Antonio Seguí. Brest also promoted the center's famed Happenings, notably those of Marta Minujín, whose interactive displays and mazes helped make the institute Buenos Aires' mazana loca (city block of madness).

The director's often challenging style did not endear him to all whose work bore his scrutiny, and some became his enemies over the years. These conflicts were satirized by a Happening staged by Federico Manuel Peralta, in which a tug-of-war was arranged on Florida Street with many of the institute's artists on one end, and the unflappable Brest on the other.

The 1966 military coup limited freedom of expression at the institute and elsewhere. Facing conditions such as this, numerous avant-garde artists (and others, particularly in academia) left Argentina, many never to return. Brest's tenure ended in 1969, and the institute closed shortly afterward. He published Ensayo sobre la contemplación artística (Essay on Artistic Contemplation), and explained that his promotion of avant-garde art at the center had been based on creative input from the artists, and "a certain objective quality, not just a belated imitation of European movements."

He also served as a jurist in numerous international biennales, notably for a number of Venice Biennales and for Documenta IV (Kassel, Germany), in 1968. He retired upon the closure of the Center for Visual Arts, though his byline appeared in occasional reviews for art magazines in Argentina and Colombia.

Brest lived during this period in a distinctive blue house in suburban City Bell designed for him by one of the artists made famous at the Di Tella Institute: Edgardo Giménez. The residence was peculiar also for Brest's bed, which was suspended five feet (1.5 m) off the ground, and could only be accessed by a ladder.

Brest was frank when discussing the neurosis, which had earned him notoriety among colleagues, and admitted to having benefited as much from psychotherapy as he did from his second wife, Marta Bontempi, who chastised his irascible moments by ordering him to "be quiet, Enrique!" (in reference to Brest's disciplinarian father).

He later relocated to a northside Buenos Aires apartment, and died in 1989, at age 83.

== Bibliography ==
- El problema del arte y del artista contemporáneos, 1937
- Prilidiano Pueyrredón, 1942
- David, 1943
- Historia del Arte, 1945, 1946, 1958
- Qué es el cubismo, 1961
- La pintura europea contemporánea, 1952
- ¿Qué es el arte abstracto?, 1962
- Ensayo sobre la contemplación artística, 1969
- El arte en la Argentina, 1969
- Arte visual: pasado, presente y futuro, 1981
- La pintura del siglo XX (1900–1974), 1986
