= Experiencias '68 =

1960's anti-authoritarian art exhibition in Argentina

- Years active: 1968
- Location: Argentina
- Major figures: Roberto Jacoby, Roberto Plate, Oscar Bony

Experiencias '68 was a controversial exhibition held at Instituto Torcuato Di Tella (IDTD) in Buenos Aires, Argentina, in May 1968, curated by Jorge Romero Brest. It included artwork by artists including Oscar Bony, Delia Cancela, Roberto Plate, and Roberto Jacoby. With this exhibition, the Institute was joining a growing movement among artists to make artwork that would challenge the government under Juan Carlos Onganía.

== Background ==
In 1966, Juan Carlos Onganía became the President of Argentina after toppling the previous President in the coup d'état, Revolución Argentina. This was Argentina's fifth military dictatorship of the century, and under the leadership of Onganía, the military began to implement heavy censorship legislation and clamped down on communist views, particularly in universities. Onganía banned all political parties and activities, and regulated everything from the arts to the length of a skirt. Arts and culture were particularly under heavy scrutiny under Onganía, and there was growing focus on the ITDT from the government.

The ITDT, created in 1958, was a non-profit institution that aimed to promote Argentine culture. Romero Brest was the director of the Centro de Artes Visuales (CAV) at the ITDT, and promoted the dissemination and experimentation of Argentine art. The years leading up to Experiencias '68 were characterized by a period of new experimentation in the realm of arts and culture, with the Argentine youth in particular, generating a new identity and challenging the conservative ideals of Onganía and the military.

In 1968 Romero Brest organized Experiencias’ 68 as an attempt to open up the arts to the people as the Instituto was, at the time, a place for the wealthy. Additionally, Brest wanted the viewers to be able to interact directly with the artists' creations rather than just look at the art from the lens of the artist. Experiencias’ 68 was also a response to the overly repressive government and dictatorship. With the art community in Buenos Aires becoming more politically aware, the exhibition was a way for them to make their voices heard through a collective action.

The government was also repressive of the ITDT after Experiencias '68, due in large parts to the anonymous graffiti that people wrote in Roberto Plate's artwork, entitled Baño, which criticized the government and the President, attracting attention from the authorities.

== Artists and Artworks ==
The exhibition contained several artworks that were subversive, such as Oscar Bony's La Familia Obrera (Blue-Collar Family), and Roberto Plate's Baño (Bathroom).

Oscar Bony, who photographed the events of Experiencias '68, was also one artist that participated in the exhibition. Bony's artwork La Familia Obrera (Blue-Collar Family) was an installation which consisted of an actual working-class family seated on a pedestal. With La Familia Obrera, it is thought that Bony wanted the elite and powerful who came to see the exhibition to notice the family as a representation of all those who were oppressed and neglected during the military dictatorship.

Another artist that submitted an artwork to be exhibited in Experiencias '68 was Roberto Jacoby. The goals and intentions of the exhibition fit in well with Jacoby's ideals and values, as Jacoby believed that art should be used to reach out to wide audiences. Jacoby displayed Message in the Di Tella (Mensaje en el Di Tella) in the exhibition. Message in the Di Tella consisted of a poster and teleprinter that was connected to France-Presse news agency. The teleprinter typed out news being reported in real time, including news about racially motivated violence and crimes as well as the Vietnam War. Jacoby's artwork criticized the elitism in arts and culture, including the assumptions about who should be able to view the art. Additionally, Jacoby pushed for the presence of political and social art, not merely art that focused on materiality.

Roberto Plate's Baño was an artwork that simulated a public restroom with separate stalls in which visitors could go and write messages. It acted as both a private and a public space: a private space where individual's could share their thoughts in a protected space and a public space that people with all backgrounds could access and communicate. Some of the messages on the stalls included messages that criticized the current President, giving the government cause for closing the exhibition.

== Censorship and Closing ==
The government censored Baño and asked the Institute to remove the artwork from the exhibition. In response to this government intervention, all the artists withdrew their work from the exhibition. The artists then began destroying their own artworks in the streets and signed a declaration against such censorship. An excerpt from the statement reads "It is not the first time that the police have supplanted the weapons of criticism by criticism of the weapons, attributing itself a role that does not belong to him: to exercise aesthetic censorship".

Thirty years after Experiencias '68 the Fundación Proa, an art center located in Buenos Aires, recreated the exhibition.
