= Torcuato di Tella Institute =

Coordinates: 34°32′51″S 58°26′48″W

- Formation: 1958
- Type: NPO
- Headquarters: Buenos Aires, Argentina
- Location: 7350 Figueroa Alcorta
- Parent organization: Torcuato di Tella Foundation

The Torcuato di Tella Institute is a non-profit foundation organized for the promotion of Argentine culture.

== Overview ==
=== 1959-1960 ===
The Di Tella Foundation and its institute were created on July 22, 1958, the tenth anniversary of the death of industrialist and arts patron, Torcuato di Tella. Funding for the project, organized by his sons, Torcuato and Guido di Tella, was raised using the United States model of corporate financing, as well as by the donation of 10% of the SIAM Di Tella corporation's public stock. Its objective was initially limited to an arts program revolving primarily around the display of the Di Tella family's private collections, which prominently included works by Henry Moore, Pablo Picasso, Amedeo Modigliani, and Jackson Pollock.

The board of the foundation consisted of family members, though the institute was directed by a board that included academics and intellectuals from outside the family. Guido Di Tella would serve as president, and the post of director of the institute was offered to Enrique Oteiza, whose family were leading Pampas-area landowners. The foundation also received funding in the form of grants from the Ford and Rockefeller Foundations, after which the modest initiative expanded into theater and music, and grew to become the most significant cultural institution in Buenos Aires of the 1960s.

The institute continued to influence prevailing trends in the history of Argentine culture, however, and it adopted and advanced a modernist trend in various artistic disciplines. Its audiovisual center, established in 1960, and directed by Roberto Villanueva, premiered with a play, El Desatino (The Folly). The production's scenery backdrops were projected through slides, and introduced audiences to Nacha Guevara and Les Luthiers. This format would be promoted in subsequent years for its ability to broadcast material through compact and portable media in a way that would stimulate a network of local groups active in the cultural field.

The Torcuato Di Tella Institute at Florida Street during its heyday in the 1960s

Following its establishment, the Di Tella art collection was transferred to the foundation, and Jorge Romero Brest hosted a free show at the National Museum of Fine Arts, which the leading local art critic directed. The activities were transferred to a small office in the Museum of Fine Arts in August 1960, and this was followed by an annual award for national and international artists, many of which sold their works to the Di Tella collection. As part of the awards program, the winners were awarded scholarships covering study abroad and an exhibition of works in a North American or European gallery. Growing local interest in Latin American art was accompanied by an initiative to show the Di Tella collection across the Argentine hinterland, for which a minibus was purchased in 1963; the experiment, however, ended the following year, when the vehicle crashed in a rural La Rioja road.

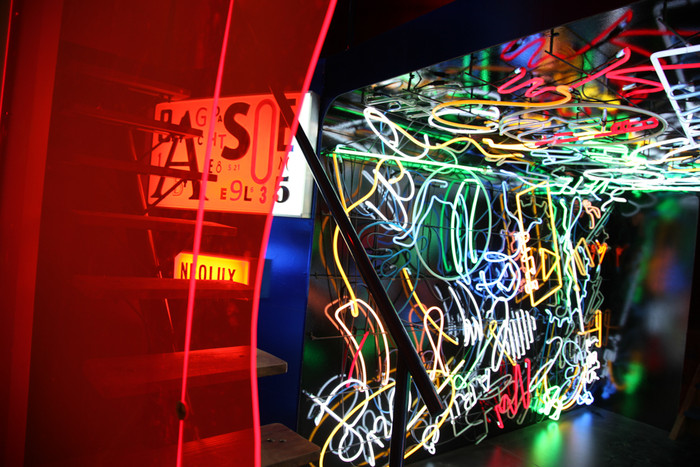
Patrons venture into La Menesunda, Marta Minujín's famed 1965 "happening" at the institute.

=== 1961-1969 ===
An initiative by Guido Di Tella led to the institute's relocation into a modern, newly completed Florida Street building in August 1963. The offices were rented by SIAM Di Tella at the northern end of Florida Street, near Plaza San Martín, a busy pedestrian intersection in the upscale Retiro district that could attract larger audiences. The building was refurbished with the addition of three stage theatres, and interiors designed to be inviting, with a floor-to-ceiling glass panel façade featuring publicity photos taken by Humberto Rivas, and a large lobby. The modern, air-conditioned building was propitious for exhibits and artistic events year-round. Its café, like the gallery, was staffed by attendants who wore no uniforms, and allowed patrons to smoke and take photographs at their leisure.

Founded by classical composer Alberto Ginastera, CLAEM (the Latin American Center for Advanced Musical Studies) was made part of the institute in 1962, yielding numerous productions of dodecaphonic, electronic, and acoustic music; CLAEM attracted prominent international guest lecturers such as Aaron Copland, Luigi Nono, and Iannis Xenakis. A visual arts center (CAV) was also inaugurated at the new address. Directed by Romero Brest, CAV became the leading Buenos Aires center for the display and promotion for avant-garde creations. CAV introduced art patrons to sculptors Juan Carlos Distéfano, Julio Le Parc, and Clorindo Testa, as well as painters Romulo Macció, Luis Felipe Noé, Jorge de la Vega, Ernesto Deira, Antonio Seguí, and conceptual artists such as Edgardo Giménez and Marta Minujín. The latter garnered interest after earning the institute's first National Award in 1964, and became known for her "happenings." Erotic in some aspects, and provocative to conservative local audiences, her early Di Tella Institute events included Eróticos en technicolor and the interactive Revuélquese y viva (Roll Around in Bed and Live). She then joined Rubén Santantonín in 1965 to create La Menesunda (Mayhem), where participants were asked to go through sixteen chambers, each separated by a human-shaped entry. Led by neon lights, groups of eight visitors would encounter rooms with television sets at full blast, couples making love in bed, a cosmetics counter (complete with an attendant), a dental office from which dialing an oversized rotary phone was required to leave, a walk-in freezer with dangling fabrics (suggesting sides of beef), and a mirrored room with black lighting, falling confetti, and the scent of frying food. The use of advertising throughout suggested the influence of pop art in Minujín's "mayhem."

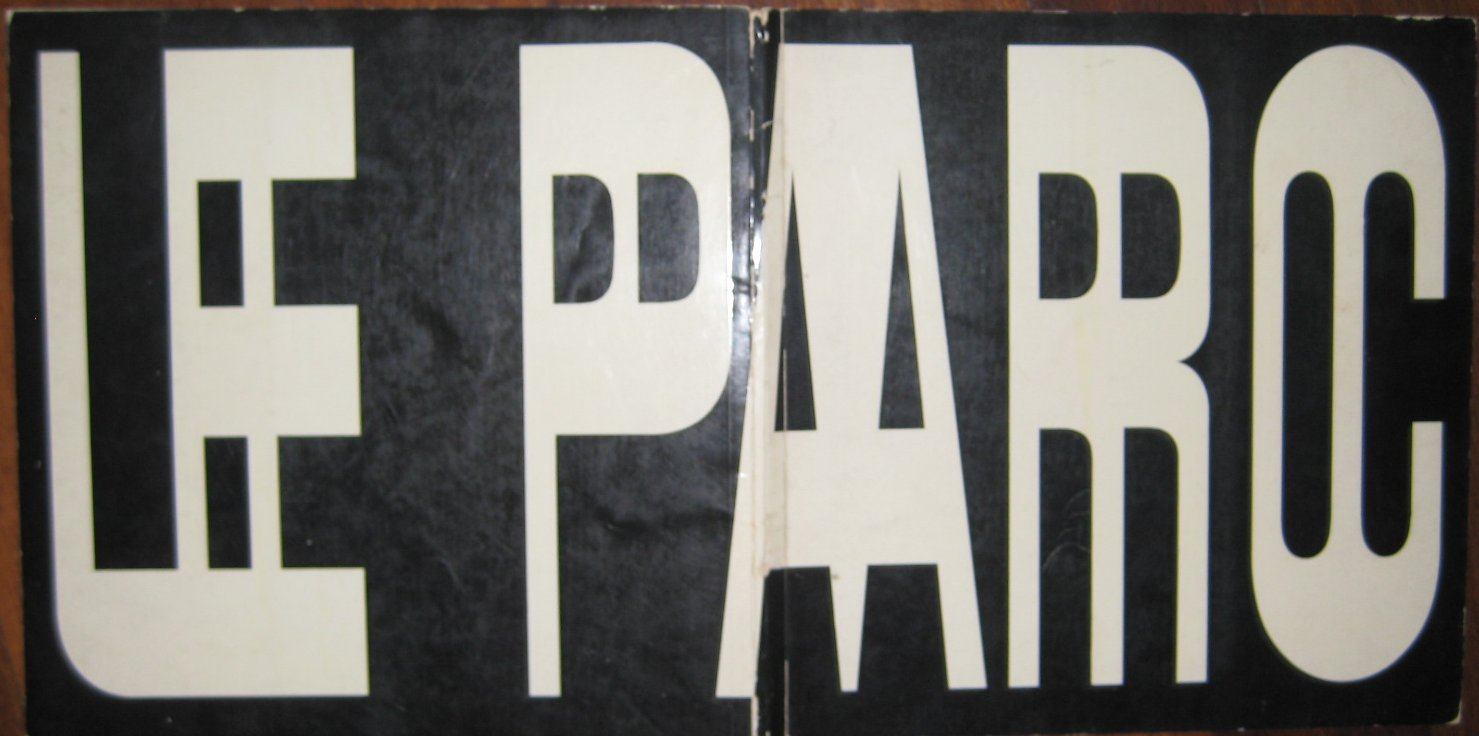
Cover designed by Juan Carlos Distéfano for the institute's 1967 exhibition of Julio Le Parc's refracted photography

Already established as the leading local center for pop art, the Di Tella Institute also became a forum for art as political commentary. This was dramatized by what became the center's most contentious display, sculptor León Ferrari's La civilización occidental y cristiana (Western-Christian Civilization), in October 1965. The work displays Christ crucified not by the traditional cross; but by a fighter plane, as a symbolic protest against the Vietnam War.

An "experience" at the Di Tella, where experimental theatre became a 'happening' for hapless audiences.

A turn of historical events in 1966 proved detrimental to the institute, and to freedom of expression, when the civilian administration of President Arturo Illia was deposed on June 28 by the Argentine Armed Forces, and was replaced with the head of the Joint Chiefs of Staff, General Juan Carlos Onganía. Moderate in comparison with many of his counterparts in other Latin American nations, Onganía was, however, a member of the right-wing Catholic power group, Opus Dei, and as such, found many of the developments in Argentine culture during the 1960s offensive. Sharing his distaste for modern culture was Luis Margaride, whom he named head of the Federal District Police, and who would be remembered for his crusades against nightclubs, long hair, and miniskirts. Facing a government policy backdrop such as this, numerous avant-garde artists (and others, particularly in academia) left Argentina, many never to return.

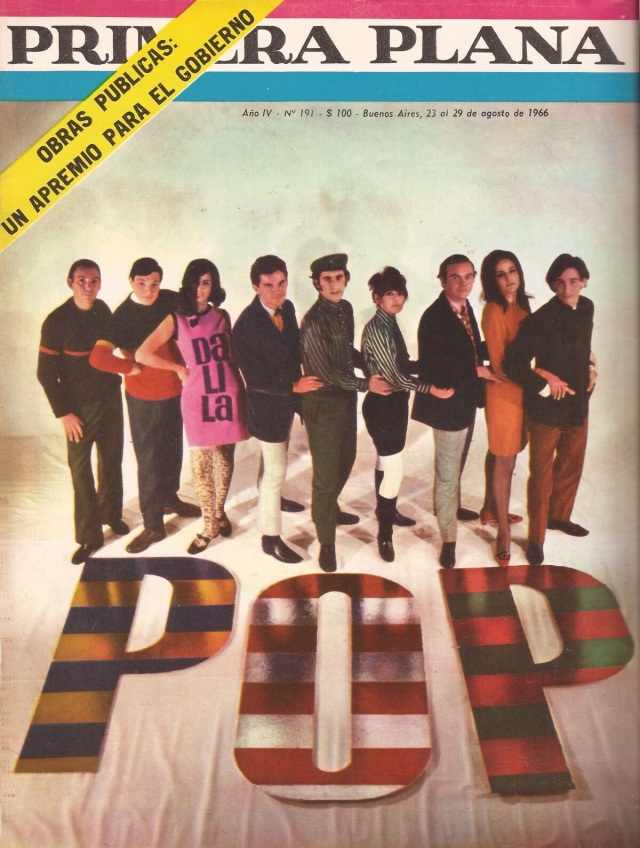
Artists from the Di Tella Institute on the cover of Primera Plana magazine, August 23, 1966.

A self-styled manzana loca (city block of madness), the center's agenda remained active initially, and this new era was marked by the advent of the "Experience" – a fusion of the more controversial happenings with experimental theatre. The decline in audiences and contributions, as well as the SIAM Di Tella Corporation's own, mounting financial problems, led to the curtailment of most of its activities by 1969, however. The Ford Foundation continued to support the institute, though these grants were contractually limited to social studies.

=== 1970-present ===
The director, Enrique Oteiza, and two leading board members, Jorge Sábato and Roberto Cortés Conde, resigned, and in May 1970, the famed Florida Street center hosted its last exhibition, a theatrical production by Marilú Marini. The foundation was bankrupt, and only the sale in 1971 of numerous works from its collection of Gothic, Renaissance, and Baroque art to the federal government for 2.1 million pesos (US$500,000), staved off its liquidation.

Remembered nostalgically by friends of the arts, and particularly during the "Dirty War" of the late 1970s, when repression of political terrorism quickly extended to dissidents and controversial artists, the institute's absence became an example of the "cultural blackout" described by writer Ernesto Sábato at the time. Following President Néstor Kirchner's appointment of Torcuato Di Tella (jr.) as Secretary of Culture in 2003, the idea of reviving the storied center was first plausibly discussed by the president of the board of regents of Torcuato Di Tella University, Manuel Mora y Araujo.

Much of the 1960s-era documentation and numerous works had been stored by the library at the university, the Di Tella family's surviving contribution to local culture, and the material's recataloguing was initiated in 2004. New facilities were developed that year from a former water company building by one of the center's alumni, sculptor and architect Clorindo Testa, and on April 21, 2007, the institute's center for visual arts was reinaugurated at the Figueroa Alcorta Avenue location with the Otro Modo (Another Way) Festival. Continuing to host media and conceptual art displays, the institute celebrated its 50th anniversary in March 2008.
