= Nueva Figuración =

Artistic movement in Latin America

- Years active: 1950-1970
- Location: Spain, Argentina, Colombia, Mexico, Venezuela
- Major figures: Luis Felipe Noé, Jorge de la Vega, Rómulo Macció, Ernesto Deira, Antonio Segui, Arnold Belkin, Francisco Icaza, Jose Luis Cuevas, Jacobo Borges, Roberto Obregón, Fernando Botero, Débora Arango, Pedro Alcántara
- Influences: Expressionism

Nueva Figuración (translated New Figuration or Neofiguration) was an artistic movement in Spain and Latin America, specifically Argentina, Mexico, and Venezuela, that embraced a new form of figurative art in response to both abstraction and traditional forms of representation. Artists advocated a return to the human figure and everyday reality. They also rejected the aestheticized forms of traditional art, employing informal techniques, expressionism, and collage.

== Origins ==
By the 1950s, informalist and geometric abstraction had gained prominence throughout Latin America. However, various artists felt that these styles lacked relevance for what was actually happening in society. They wanted to incorporate a more expressive style and recapture the figure in their works. They did not want to go back to the social and political figuration that was practiced in the 1930s and 1940s, but rather focus on more subjective experience. These artists were concerned with the way individuals interacted with society, and Neofiguration was a way for artists to meaningfully engage with the politics and culture within their respective countries. In Mexico, Venezuela, and Argentina, Neofiguration referenced previous themes found in abstraction, such as the informal use of line and color, but also including the human figure. In Colombia, Neofiguration was developed more out of the academic tradition, as seen in Fernando Botero.

== Argentina ==
=== Political Backdrop ===
The political situation in Argentina played an important role in the emergence of the Neofiguration movement among Argentine artists. The political turmoil in Argentina began with a military coup d’état which ousted President Juan Perón from office in October 1955. In 1958, Arturo Frondizi won the presidential elections with a clear majority of the votes. However, Frondizi soon backed out of promises made during the election, and a wave of violent strikes ensued, prompting the new president to impose a state of siege. By 1959, the country was in serious national debt, accrued primarily due to the poor management of state enterprises. In October 1959, Péron supporters planned a massive demonstration that was expected to turn violent. The police and military seized firearms and explosives in a series of raids, and they arrested hundreds of Perón supporters who protested in the streets. These raids and arrests were all legal under the state of siege.

=== Otra Figuración Members ===
Nueva Figuración is often associated directly with a group of Argentine artists who formed Otra Figuración in 1961. They included Jorge de la Vega, Luis Felipe Noé, Rómulo Macció, and Ernesto Deira. Other Argentine artists associated with Nueva Figuración include Antonio Segui. Otra Figuración wanted to reclaim the figure in their work as a way to engage with the tumultuous political situation. The Neofigurative works in Argentina are characterized by bright colors and free brushwork.

Luis Felipe Noé, considered the intellectual leader of the group, was the quickest to adopt a more expressionistic style of painting. In 1959, he opened his first solo exhibition in the midst of Argentina's political unrest, and his works were already being noted for their “semi-figurative language.” This exhibition was also significant because it was the first time Noé met Rómulo Macció and Jorge de la Vega who would also become members of Otra Figuración. Noé's early works often deal with themes of power, as demonstrated in paintings such as History of Human Indulgence (1960) and Theory and Practice of Power (1961). These paintings suggest Noé's pessimism regarding the political evolution in Argentina. He primarily viewed the world as one of chaos and accepted this chaos as a guiding principle in navigating society. Noé also employed collage and a diverse range of mediums in his paintings. An example of this is Thundering Jupiter from 1960, in which he threw, scraped, and splattered oil paint, enamel, shoe polish, furniture polish and floor wax. Though he employed an expressionistic style, Noé conveyed the social commitment of his art in warning against what he considered to be the greatest downfall of expressionism: excessive focus on oneself. In 1960, Noé stated “I want to show something more than just my will to expression and my self. I believe that the self, by itself, is of no interest to anyone. But rather the self in relation to the world: that is, when it ceases being a self and becomes an element in that relationship.” Thus, Noé defined early the mission of Nueva Figuración as a movement that was both expressive in its use of the figure, but also dedicated to the social reality of Argentina at the time.

Rómulo Macció was a self-taught artist, graphic designer, and painter whose first solo exhibition in 1956 predominantly featured art of surrealist themes. Macció joined Phases, a neosurrealist group which sought middle ground between the decorative art of abstractionism and the overtly politically motivated art of social realism. Otra Figuración mirrored the objective of Phases in its desire to branch away from both geometric abstractionism and social realism, calling artists to engage with society, but also to transcend political issues rather than pick sides. In fact, Noé cites Boa, an Argentine strand of Phases, as the most significant influence in the ideology of Otra Figuración. Around this same time, Macció's work became more spontaneous and expressive, signifying his transition into Neogfiguration and Otra Figuración.

Jorge de la Vega, coming from a background of architecture and abstraction, took the longest of the group before shifting into a more expressionistic style of painting. His shift to include figures can be seen in 1959, with works such as Los Náufragos in which eyes and mouths can be identified among the complex, flowing lines. He also created collages to incorporate the figure, such as Danza de montaña in 1963. This work is composed of rags glued together to form an intense and even violent subject, equaled in intensity by the physical texture of the piece. Noé specifically noted de la Vega for his “darker… more textured” style which was “executed with free, lyrical gestures.”

Ernesto Deira was the last to be introduced to Noé by Macció in 1960. Deira was a lawyer who had also studied painting and came to the group already a strong figural artist. In expressing a common commitment to the expressionistic use of the figure, Deira became the fourth member of Otra Figuración. Deira's style was significantly influenced by Francisco Goya’s Black Paintings, but with freer brushwork.

These four artists worked together under the name Otra Figuración from 1961 to 1965, based in an old hat factory which was given to Noé by his father and served as a studio space.

=== Exhibitions and Impact ===
Otra Figuración exhibited several times together between 1961 and 1965. Their first group exhibition, simply titled Otra Figuración, was held in Buenos Aires in 1961 and was well-received, yet also recognized as innovative and new. Over their years together, the group won various prizes and participated in international exhibitions in Paris, New York, and several other cities across the United States. They received some criticism for their ground-breaking development of Neofiguration and their rejection of established art norms, but they generally maintained institutional support. Their joint work is noted for its radical and spontaneous nature, and the group for their intense commitment to demonstrating expressive freedom and addressing Argentina's most pressing issues. The group continued to work together until disbanding in 1965, at which time the political situation was becoming increasingly repressive and the country continued to be plagued by a series of military dictatorships and unrest.

== Mexico ==
=== Emergence in Mexico ===
Neofiguration emerged in Mexico at the same time it was being practiced by Otra Figuración in Argentina. However, the Neofiguration movement in Mexico was pursued by artists as a reaction against Mexican Muralism, which was seen as too nationalistic and politically motivated. The first significant push away from muralism was captured before the 1950s in Rufino Tamayo’s cubist-style works. This encouraged many younger artists to also step away from the muralism tradition, which had at this point become the institutionalized art form of Mexico.

José Luis Cuevas, the first artist to take up a neofigurative style in Mexico, was also reacting against the predominance of muralism. However, he was not inspired to follow the same path as Tamayo. Rather, Cuevas related more meaningfully to Jose Orozco’s style of painting and his existential use of the human figure. Cuevas first started to work in this style in the 1950s, with Neofiguration really starting to build prominence in Mexico in the 1960s. Cuevas also spoke out directly against muralism in his 1956 manifesto “Cactus Curtain,” which criticized muralism for its allegiance to nationalism.

Contrary to the perspective of muralists like Diego Rivera and David Siqueiros who saw a world composed of either heroes or villains, Cuevas saw individuals as the products of larger forces, such as war and isolation. Cuevas’ works evoke a consistent theme of alienation. His subject matter focuses on those people who are most marginalized by society, highlighting prostitutes, performers, people with mental health issues, and the poor. His figures are often depicted as distorted versions of the human form. Cuevas included self-portraits in some of his works, painting his own figure among other alienated figures in society. In terms of medium, Cuevas chose to work in ink drawing and watercolor as opposed to oil painting. He saw oil painting as too slow and correctable, whereas drawing and watercolor embodied a more immediate and personal method of conveying ideas and connecting with the viewer.

=== Nueva Presencia ===
In the 1960s, Neofiguration was taken up by more artists in Mexico, with Francisco Icaza and Arnold Belkin at the forefront. Belkin and Icaza embraced Neofiguration and formed a group called Nueva Presencia (translated "New Presence") in 1961. At the same time, they published their first issue of a magazine-poster also called Nueva Presencia in August 1961. Some members of this group included Leonel Góngora (Colombian but based in Mexico), painter Francisco Corzas, and photographer Ignacio “Nacho” López.

The artists of Nueva Presencia shared Cuevas’ commitment to anti-aesthetic art. They adopted an expressionistic and informal style as they called for a common rejection of abstraction. Furthermore, they denounced art that was motivated by a specific political agenda. However, Nueva Presencia differed from Cuevas in that they were committed to the idea that artists needed to be socially responsible in addressing the pressing issues of the day. Whereas Cuevas acted as an observer in political and social spheres, the artists of Nueva Presencia felt obligated to participate in society, demanding an “art which does not separate man as an individual from man as an integral part of society. No one, especially the artist, has a right to be indifferent to the social order.” This magazine-poster denounced art of bourgeoisie “good taste” and rather pushed a form of art that was relevant for their contemporaries. Their commitment was not to specific social issues, such as poverty or local politics; rather, their works addressed larger issues concerning humanity. They wanted to respond to the atrocities they witnessed in World War II, namely the Holocaust, the atomic bomb, and Hiroshima. Their works were targeted toward the general public and their subject matter encompassed broad themes of war and violence.

This same objective is expressed in Selden Rodman’s book The Insiders. Belkin reviewed this book in the first issue of the Nueva Presencia publication, affirming their shared mission to participate in the larger society. Many artists who were a part of Nueva Presencia participated in the corresponding Los Interiostas exhibition on July 20th, 1961 and the artists who participated are sometimes referred to by the group name "Los Interioristas."

Belkin and Icaza published a total of five issues of Nueva Presencia between July 1961 and September 1963, during which time they also produced their own individual artworks. A sixth issue had been planned by Belkin, but the group dissolved before it could be published. The group's work culminated in 1963 with a continuing strain to affirm a common humanity and promote social responsibility, but the group was ultimately disbanded by 1964 due to a combination of petty jealousies, tensions, and misunderstandings.

=== Contemporary neofiguration in Mexico ===
The neofigurative tradition established by Cuevas and the Nueva Presencia group continues to influence contemporary Mexican artists. Veronica Ruiz de Velasco (born 1960) is a prominent contemporary Mexican neo-figurative painter whose work blends realism and abstraction with bold, vibrant colors and dynamic compositions. Mentored by Rufino Tamayo, who praised her exceptional use of color, Ruiz de Velasco became one of the youngest female artists to exhibit solo at Mexico's Museo de Arte Moderno in 1988. Her highly stylized, almost abstract representations of performers and dancers continue the neofigurative exploration of the human form established by earlier Mexican neofigurative artists.

== Venezuela ==
In Venezuela, Jacobo Borges and Roberto Obregón also embraced Neofiguration. In 1958, the military regime that had ruled Venezuela for 10 years was replaced by a democratic government. The new government caused widespread frustration, as its socialist tendencies angered the right, while its opposition to Castroites angered the left, including Borges. In response, Borges began to work in an expressionistic style and took up a form of Neofiguration that was more overtly political than the works of his Mexican and Argentine counterparts. Borges had direct contact with Mexican artists who were a part of Nueva Figuración, and he participated in an exhibition in 1959 with younger Mexican artists at the Palacio Nacional de Bellas Artes. His work is characterized by vibrant colors which highlight his critique of the Venezuelan bourgeoisie. Borges efforts in the Neofigurative style culminated in 1963–1965, a period which produced some of his best known works.

== Colombia ==
In Colombia, prominent artists to embrace figurative painting include Fernando Botero and Débora Arango. These artists, along with Pedro Alcántara, employed the figure as a means to challenge political oppression. The Colombian Neofigurative artists pursued this style as a means to respond to the horrors of La Violencia. Though tensions between the conservatives and liberals began in 1946, the beginning of La Violencia is often marked by the assassination of politician Jorge Eliécer Gaitán in 1948. This civil war in Colombia was a bitter and violent struggle that caused widespread death and devastation among the people of Colombia and the society at large.

Neofiguration in Colombia had its roots in late cubism rather than geometric abstraction, as in Mexico and Argentina. Fernando Botero's contribution to Neofiguration coincide with his appropriation of the most famous works throughout art history, from the Middle Ages, to the Impressionists, to Picasso and Matisse. However, in his reworking of these famous paintings. Botero puts his own spin on the original subjects. Botero's figures are easily recognized for their unique and consistently large proportions. These "inflated" figures are identifiable in all of his works, including not only historical appropriations, but also scenes depicting the violence of Colombia's civil war.

Débora Arango embraced a neofigurative style as her response to La Violencia as well. In her approach to the figure, she satirized military, political, and religious leaders. In Laureano's Exit (c. 1957), for example, she depicts the military general behind the coup d'état of 1953 and a well-known politician as having the legs of frogs and reptiles. Arango's chose to work in oil painting, and her works are characterized by their inventive, brushy, and assertive style.
