= Delia Cancela =

Argentine pop artist and fashion designer

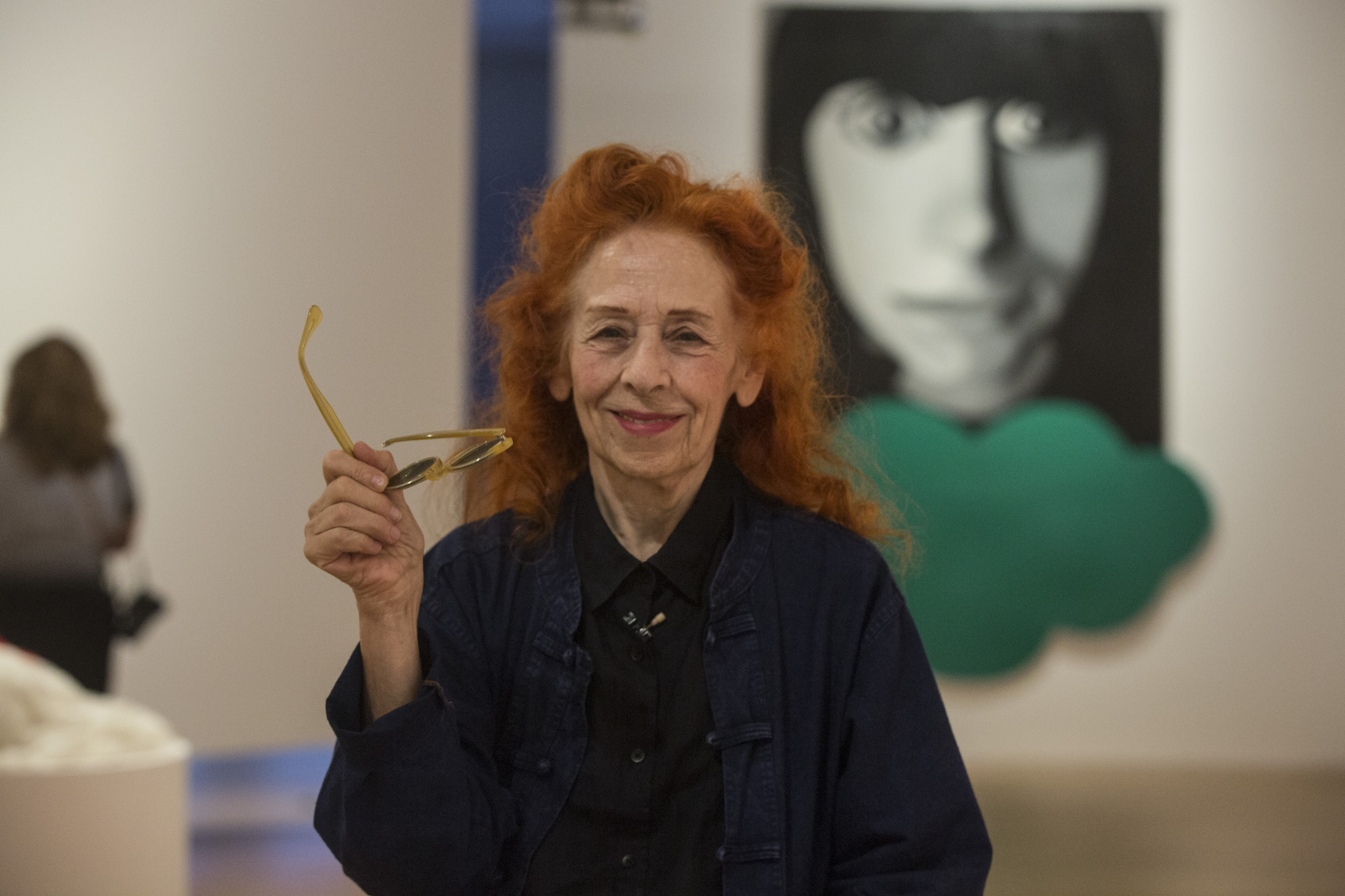
- Cancela in 2018
- Born: 1940 (age 85–86); Buenos Aires, Argentina
- Education: Escuela Superior de Bellas Artes
- Known for: Painting, Fashion Design
- Movement: Pop Art
- Spouse: Pablo Mesejean

Delia Cancela (born 1940, Buenos Aires) is an Argentine pop artist and fashion designer. She has lived in Argentina, New York, London and Paris, and exhibited internationally. Retrospective exhibitions of her work and her collaborations with Pablo Mesejean include Delia Cancela 2000-Retrospectiva (2000), Pablo & Delia, The London Years 1970-1975 (2001), and Delia Cancela: una artista en la moda (2013).

== Early life and education ==
Delia Cancela was born in 1940 in Buenos Aires, Argentina. She studied at the Escuela Superior de Bellas Artes in Buenos Aires.

== Career ==
External videos
- "Della Cancela y Pablo Mesejean en su atelier 1967", DiFilm
- "A visit with Delia Cancela in her home in Buenos Aires August 2015", ashadedview

Cancela began to exhibit widely in the early 1960s. Her work, which incorporated images such as Elvis Presley, made her part of Buenos Aires' pop art scene. She was one of 6 artistas en Lirolay. Sexteto ('Six Artists in Lirolay: Sextet') at the Galería Lirolay, representing the best of Buenos Aires "new art" in January 1964.

Cancela exhibited at the Museo Nacional de Bellas Artes and won the Premio de Honor Ver y Estimar in 1963 and 1964. The arts review journal Ver y Estimar ('Look and Consider') was formed by Jorge Romero Brest and published from 1948 to 1955. An association was founded in 1954 which awarded the Premio de Honor Ver y Estimar from 1960-1968. One of Cancela's well-known pieces from this time is Broken Heart (1964).

Her work was included in the exhibition Arte Nuevo de la Argentina ('New Art of Argentina', 1964) which was co-organized by the Instituto Torcuato Di Tella (ITDT) and the Walker Art Center, in Minneapolis, Minnesota. The exhibition traveled to Buenos Aires, Rio de Janeiro and Minneapolis.

From the 1960s until his death in 1991, Cancela collaborated with Pablo Mesejean. They married in 1965. Their work is non-traditional and cross-disciplinary, incorporating theater and costume design, fine art and fashion. In 1965, Cancela and Mesejean held their first full exhibition Love and Life at Galería Lirolay. Combining painting, set design, music and performance, this exhibit has been identified by critic Nelly Perazzo as one of a series of "true landmarks" in forward-looking Argentinian art. In 1966 Cancela and Mesejean exhibited Nosotros Amamos ('We Love') at the Instituto Torcuato Di Tella, supporting acceptance of gender identity and popular culture. They also signed a "manifesto":

"Nosotros amamos los días de sol, las plantas, los Rolling Stones, las medias blancas, rosas y plateadas, a Sonny and Cher, a Rita Tushingham y a Bob Dylan (...) las gorras de color, las caras blancas y los finales felices, el mar, bailar, las revistas, el cine (...) los baby girls, las girl-girls, las boy girls, los girl-boys y los boy-boys".

Receipt of the Premio Braque from the French government in 1966 enabled Cancela and Mesejean to travel to Paris in 1967. On their return to Argentina they participated in Experiencias 68 (Experiencias Visuales). There was considerable political tension around the exhibit. One of the pieces, Roberto Plate's El Baño ('The Bathroom'), was removed by police because visitors had "decorated" it with anti-governmental graffiti. Delia Cancela was one of several artists who removed their works and destroyed them, as an act of sympathy and in protest of the creation of a police state.

While in Argentina in 1968, Cancela and Mesejean also held a fashion show Ropa con Riesgo ('Clothing with Risk') at ITDT. They worked with Alfredo Rodríguez Arias to create costumes for an adaptation of Dracula. They lived briefly in New York during 1969 to 1970.

From 1970 to 1975 they lived in London where they started the Pablo & Delia clothing brand. The fashions they designed were worn by celebrities such as Bianca Jagger, and were featured on the cover of Vogue and appeared in Harper's Bazaar, and Queen. Their pieces are in the collection of the Victoria & Albert Museum in London. Aside from these exhibition, Delia & Pablo worked with architect Osvaldo Giesso. They displayed some of their art works and pieces at Giesso's boutique, La flor de San Telmo.

In 1975 Cancela and Mesejean returned to Paris, working with Yves Saint Laurent, Kenzo and the group Créateurs. Their shows incorporated elements of parades and performances. French critic Pierre Restany described their style as Pop Lunfardo ('Vernacular Pop').

Pablo Mesejean died in 1991. In 1999 Delia Cancela returned to Argentina. She lives in Buenos Aires and in Paris, France. She continues to design and exhibit.

== Major exhibitions ==
- New Art of Argentina (1964)
- Love and Life, with Pablo Mesejean, Galería Lirolay, Buenos Aires (1965)
- Delia Cancela 2000-Retrospectiva, 2000, curated by María José Herrera, Centro Cultural Parque de España in Rosario
- Pablo & Delia, The London Years 1970-1975, Judith Clark Costume Gallery, London, 24 May – 21 July 2001
- La consagración de la Primavera, Group exhibition, Fundación Osde, Buenos Aires, 2010.
- Delia Cancela: una artista en la moda, el Centro Metropolitano de Diseño, Buenos Aires, 2013.
- International Pop, Group exhibition, Walker Art Center, Minneapolis (April 11, 2015 – September 6, 2015)
- The EY Exhibition: The World Goes Pop, Group exhibition, Tate Modern (17 September 2015 – 24 January 2016)
- Special exhibit in her honor at ArteBA, Buenos Aires (June 4–7, 2015)

== Awards and nominations ==
- 1963: 1964, Ver y Estimar Prize
- 1966: the Acquisition Prize of the XXV Salón de Arte de Mar del Plata
- 1966: Di Tella Prize
- 1966: Premio Braque, with Pablo Mesejean
- 2001: Premio Directorio a la Trayectoria del Fondo Nacional de las Artes
