= Otra Figuración =

Argentinian artistic movement

Otra Figuración was an art movement in Argentina founded by Jorge de la Vega, Ernesto Deira, Rómulo Macció, and Luis Felipe Noé in 1961. They advocated a return to figurative art when abstract and often geometric styles were prominent, and they worked in an expressive style with bold colors and sometimes mixed media. They not only shared these ideas, but they also shared a studio in Buenos Aires and exhibited together, gaining widespread recognition with an exhibition at the Museo Nacional de Bellas Artes in 1963. They ultimately disbanded in 1964.

== See also ==
- Latin American art
