= Oscar Bony =

Argentine artist (1941–2002)

- Born: Oscar Rubén Bony; June 10, 1941; Posadas, Misiones, Argentina
- Died: 2002 (aged 60–61); Buenos Aires, Argentina
- Education: Colegio de Posadas
- Notable work: La Familia Obrera (the working-class family), Fue, ni Fue, Nunca lo sabremos (it was him, it was not him, we will never know)
- Movement: Conceptual Art
- Website: https://www.oscarbony.com/

Oscar Rubén Bony (1941–2002) was an Argentine avant-garde artist known for his innovative and daring work. Bony was a very active artist who exhibited his work often. He wanted his work to make a huge statement, by having the public experience the events occurring in Argentina's culture while capturing innocence, guilty, and the people being trapped. He wanted his people to open their eyes to the injustice that was happening to the people and how life was for the less fortunate.

== Biography ==
=== Early life ===
Born on June 10, 1941, in the city of Posadas, in the northern province of Misiones. His mother was Emma Martinez, a Paraguayan who worked as a teacher; and his father was Luciano Roman Bony, an Argentine, who worked as a wrangler and saddle maker.

=== Training ===
Bony graduated from Colegio de Posadas with an undergraduate degree and began his artistic training with Lucas Braulio Areco. At the age of 17, Oscar Bony began studying painting with a local professor. In 1959, he received a grant to travel to Buenos Aires to study at the Escuela Preparatoria de Bellas Artes. Then, in the 1960s, he trained at the prestigious Instituto Torcuato di Tella in Buenos Aires. Despite this training, he considered himself a self-taught artist. From 1965 to 1968, he experienced many different movements of art, which ranged from pop art, minimalism, and conceptual art. This positioned him in the midst of a radical movement—the avant-garde movement then taking place in alternative galleries in Argentina. As he continued with his career, he held many important public positions for many years revolving around art.

From 1959 to 1963, Bony took classes at the Demetrio Urruchua and Juan Carlos Castagnino's studios. Oscar worked as an assistant for Antonio Berni He focused on imagery, and this phase of his life revealed a certain expression of realism, which then moved him towards the new figuration movement. For his early art, he proclaimed himself to be self-taught but later in life, he stopped working with art and began practicing photography. He was a photographer for a record label group in Argentina between 1967 and 1973. Throughout his career and work, he did many different positions. With those different positions, Bony learned the basics of his craft from Areco, but he always considered himself to be self taught. Bony moved to Milan after Argentina's military coup in 1976, returning to Argentina only after the end of the dictatorship in 1988. His work ranged from painting to live installations to video, finally focusing primarily on photography towards the end of his life. His work dealt predominantly with the theme of violence. Bony produced work on the theme of suicide, justice, execution and death.

=== Death ===
Oscar Bony died in 2002 when he was 61 years of age. Despite his late work on the topic of suicide, he did not commit suicide himself, as most people would think, but rather died of an intestinal disease that was not yet fully diagnosed. This would end up showing through his artwork, because it is embedded with ethical frustration and despair. It seemed like he would use his artwork and photography to display the pain as well as quite possibly depression that he may have been going through due to the disease he was living with. Just before his death, he was working on his suicide series which could be interpreted as him wanting to end his life as well as his suffering.

== Awards/Exhibitions ==
Oscar Bony won many awards:

1955 - 1st student prize for office of culture of the province of Missiones, Posadas.

1958 - 1st prize in Semana Del Mar

1958 - 1st prize in Amigos del Arte

1962 - 1st prize in Salon de Artes Plasticas de Missiones.

1963 - honorable mention in Salon de Rosario a

1963 - honorable mention in Salon de Artes Del Mar del Plata

1963 - Salon annual Museo Provincio de Bellas Artes Rosa Galisteo de Rodriguez.

1965 - honorary prize in Premio de Honor ver estimar

1976 - 1st prize in Marcelo de Ridder Prize

1976 - Banco del Acuerdo Prize

1996 - Artist of the Year

1997 - Artist of the Year

1998 - Artistic Creativity Prize

1998 - Candidate for Abraham Haber Photographer of the Year Prize

1998 - Aldo Pellegrini Photographer of the Year Prize

1999 - honorable mention in the Costantini 99 prize

2001 - honorable mention in Segundo Premio Banco de la Nation Argentina a las Artes Visuales. In 2002, all of the prizes and awards he won in Buenos Aires, Argentina.

== Exhibitions ==
Oscar Bony participated in many exhibitions. Starting from 1958 and ending in 2007, his first exhibition in 1958 was the Ciclo de Becarios to his last exhibition which was El Amigo Abros. His work went on to be exhibited 5 years after his death. He also was involved in many group exhibitions starting in the 1960s on to today. The most popular one that he was involved with, the most well known, was Experencias '68, but he was also shown in From Figurations to System Art in London in 1971, as well as Otra Fotografia in Buenos Aires in 1997. Bony's work was the subject of a retrospective, "Oscar Bony: el Mago," at the Museo de Arte Latinoamericano de Buenos Aires from November 2007 to February 2008.

== Artwork ==
La Familia Obrera (The Working Class Family), 1968. His most famous work is La Familia Obrera (The Working Class Family). It was a controversial installation that consisted of an actual working-class family seated on a pedestal for eight hours. Bony used and paid a working-class family to sit in the gallery while recorded sounds of their everyday life played in the background. First executed for the influential exhibition Experiencias '68 at the Instituto Torcuato Di Tella, the work was recreated in a 2004 exhibit at the Houston Museum of Modern Art. The performance drew attention to questions of class and inequality not discussed in the mainstream Argentinian press. Experiencias '68 was considered subversive, in part because of Bony's artwork, and was censored by the police.

60 Metros Cuadrados y su Informacion (60 Square Meters and its Information), 1967. Bony's installation 60 metros cuadrados y su informacion (60 Square meters and its information) was first shown as part of Experiencias Visuales 1967. This work comprises 60 square meters of chain-link fence on the floor of the gallery with film projector screening a detail of the fencing. The visitors were encouraged to walk on the fencing to fully engaged with the experience of being held captive. The spectators' experience walking on this surface is contrasted with the projected image.

Fue, no Fue, Nunca Los Sabremos (It was him, It was not him, We will never know), 1998. This artwork fell under the series of photographs that he did titled Suicidios (Suicide). This depicts the death of the subject-author. The images do not only evoke or allude to violence that cannot be seen, but also draw to real violence that is in the making. In this series Oscar exposes violence, while leaving the work riddled with bullets. The words "fue, no fue" are written on a piece of paper held by a masked subject. These words are used as way to describe the innocence or guilt of the person.

=== Additional Artwork ===
- Sin Titulo, 1986 (Herlitzaka + Faria)

- Pan American Art project

- Kriminal, 1998. This is a photograph of a man shot dead on a staircase behind glass shot with a 9-millimeter pistol. With this photograph Oscar Bony is alluding to the idea of death and violence.

- La Ley Divina No tiene Porgue ser Justa (The Divine law doesn't have to be fair), 1998

- Los Cielos (The Skies) 1975
