= Alberto Heredia (sculptor) =

Argentine sculptor (1924–2000)

- Born: March 4, 1924; Buenos Aires, Argentina
- Died: April 23, 2000 (aged 76); Buenos Aires, Argentina
- Known for: Painting and sculpture
- Movement: Expressionism

Alberto Heredia (March 4, 1924–April 23, 2000) was an Argentine Expressionist painter and sculptor. His work encompassed themes of the human condition regarding consumption and power. Through use of garbage and found objects assembled into sculptures, he created narratives of consumerism and censorship that he felt affected Argentina. Heredia’s work dealt with contemporary political issues in Argentina, as well as more universal themes such as loneliness, love, death and existence. He won the prestigious Konex Award from Argentina several times (1982, 1992 and 2002), being the last one posthumous.

== Biography ==
=== Early life and childhood ===
Alberto Carlos Heredia was born in Buenos Aires on March 4, 1924. He was the eldest of four siblings. His father Hector Heredia was a merchant, and his mother Margarita Matilde Tramullas was the daughter of a Spanish family that had first emigrated to France and later to Argentina in 1916. His is Spanish heritage through his mother was an important part of his life and influenced his art. His mother was very protective and ensured that he had a religious upbringing, but his father's sudden death deeply affected him. His father was an authoritarian figure and gambler, and although his death was reportedly an accident, Alberto remembered it as a violent death which was probably related to gambling debts.

=== Education and artistic influences ===
In 1945, at the age of 21, Alberto Heredia enrolled at the National School of Ceramics. He was there briefly before enrolling in the workshops of the National School of Bellas Artes where he met Horacio Juarez, who became his first sculpture professor and mentor. There Heredia studied works by great classical artists including Michelangelo, Heredia claimed not to subscribe to the regular academic life and was subsequently expelled from the school within a year. Heredia continued to stay in contact with Juarez but maintained the idea that he was a self-taught artist.

As his art evolved, some of the influences he attributed to his success included writings by the French poet Arthur Rimbaud, existentialists such as Jean-Paul Sartre and Albert Camus, and thinkers such as José Ortega y Gasset. He also cited influence from abstract artists like Gyula Kosice, and the avant-garde movement. He later became friends with Alberto Greco who influenced how he viewed art and life, and they would go out to perform vivo dito works together in Paris.

=== Early artistic career, and fall of the Perón regime ===
After Heredia’s expulsion from the National School of Ceramics in 1945, he continued to make sculptures. Most of the work that Heredia was producing from 1945 to 1948 remained figurative and expressionistic. There is very little evidence of Heredia’s early figurative work because he entered the international art scene in 1948, after becoming acquainted with the Concreto-Invención group in Buenos Aires. This progression led him to fully renounce his earlier beginning period of expressionistic figurative art. Not long after this he became immersed in abstraction and its freedom, subsequently abandoning figurative sculpture or modeling and destroying most of his early figurative work. He developed his own technique of crafting art out of garbage materials and finding the expressive qualities of the trash that he used in a way that made sense to his work.

After the Revolución Libertadora toppled the Perón regime in 1955, Heredia made art that reacted to the subsequent modernization and industrialization of Argentina. His new abstract works culminated in his first solo exhibition at the Galatea Gallery in Buenos Aires in 1960. Heredia also participated in the First International Exhibition of Modern Art at the Teatro General San Martín in 1960.

The "Cajas de Camembert" (Camembert Boxes) series, which was finished in 1962, remains one of Heredia’s better-known works. The rejection of spectator participation and exploring the aesthetics of residual objects is characteristic of this period in Heredia's career. The name comes from the cheese boxes where he keeps photos of children and men, baby dolls, bones, hair, and various other garbage. This series of artworks consists of mixed media with the underlying idea of life worked into them. In this way, Camembert Boxes conveys a life cycle from birth to death. The material used in the Camembert Boxes, including waste materials, bones and bandages, was characteristic of his work.

=== Accident, death sentence and hiding in Uruguay ===
After a devastating fall from a horse in 1963, Heredia underwent multiple surgeries that had him immobile and covered in various plasters for two years. This was a difficult time in Heredia’s life during which he began using plaster and wrappings in his art, recalling casts and bandages. Heredia’s art continued to explore political issues, speaking out against the consumerism, censorship, and crime that he felt was endemic in Argentina during the 60s and 70s. In many ways, his work in the late 60s and early 70s prophesied the years of terror that Argentina experienced in the Dirty War which continued into the 1980s. He made the "Engendros" ("Spawn") series as a response to censorship issues in Argentina. Much of his other work in the 70s was marked by the fury and pain of contained violence that censorship imposed on people. This came in the forms of dental prosthesis, tongues, and gags which regularly made appearance in Heredia’s work.

His 1974 series "Los amordazamientos" ("The Gagged") was an allegory on censorship, and the dynamics of sex, power and religion. The series was presented in several exhibitions that year. Along with the series, he publicly denounced the violence and atrocities taking place in Argentina at the time at the Art System’s in Latin America show at the Institution of Contemporary Arts in London. This led to him being effectively exiled by the Argentine Anticommunist Alliance (Triple A), a Peronist death squad. The Triple A accused him of being a communist extremist, atheist, homosexual and drug addict. In December of 1974, they sentenced Heredia to death if he did not leave the country by January 1975. Heredia went into hiding in Uruguay for two months. Upon his return to Buenos Aires he took a step away from direct political involvement and revised works he had produced after 1960, which ended with him casting several of his earlier works in bronze.

=== Later years and death ===
In the late 1970s and early 1980s Heredia produced his Silver Series where he made mixed media sculptures painted in silver which marked his switch back to commentary on consumption. This era of work was highly critical of consumerism, symbolizing the deterioration of values and the decline of society. Throughout the 80s and 90s he produced art which criticized power and societal issues. He continued to speak out against Argentina’s government and rulers with his series of "Thrones" (1984) which consisted of throne-like structures placed on pedestals which questioned the role of authority and reduced positions of power.

In some of his last works before his death in 2000, Heredia began dismantling everyday objects to create sculptures. Heredia died in Buenos Aires on April 23, 2000, at the age of 76.

== Artwork and themes ==
Alberto Heredia is often considered to be an Expressionist, although his work has also been described as an example of Surrealism and Pop art. His sculptures have also been compared to the Otra Figuración movement which started in Argentina in 1961. Curator Carlos Basualdo has noted that in much of Heredia's later work with detritus the artist had "a coherent esthetic exploration of the residual: the wretchedness of materials and the wretchedness of the contents that those materials are forced to express." Heredia is known for incorporating political themes such as "sardonic crosses and mummified national heroes" into his work, which is often satirical. Many of his works satirize middle-class Argentine values. For example, "El Caballero de la Mascara" was described as a critique of Argentine militarism and authoritarianism. The irreverent nature of his work made him controversial.

Heredia described the Camembert Boxes as "my own means of expression, an intimate medium, a personal medium. I dreamed and discovered my worlds: sex, religion, life and death. Camembert boxes begins in life and death. He will come down with debris, with traces of memory, always keeping the material in a primitive and wild state without danger of craft."

== Reception and legacy ==
Heredia has been considered to be one of Argentina's most influential sculptors, alongside Juan Carlos Distéfano and Yoel Novoa. A retrospective article on Heredia's legacy described him as "one of the great protagonists of the radical avant-garde of the 1960s".

Heredia posthumously donated his workshop and 568 original artworks to the Buenos Aires Museum of Modern Art. Heredia's art is kept in the Heredia Cabinet at the Buenos Aires Museum of Modern Art. The museum also holds an archive of collected correspondences, photographs, and other items which document Heredia's life.

== List of exhibitions ==
- 1967, “Surrealism in Argentina”, Instituto Torcuato Di Tella
- 1971, “The Artist and the World of Consumption”, Carmen Gallery
- 1971, “Useful and Useless Objects”, Museum of Modern Art in Buenos Aires
- 1972, “Artist Award Salon with Acrilicopaolini III”, Museum of Modern Art in Buenos Aires
- 1974, “Art System’s in Latin America”, Institute of Contemporary Arts in London
- 1978, “Alberto Heredia”, Balmaceda Gallery in Buenos Aires
- 1979, “Postfiguration, curated by Jorge Glusberg”, Center for Art and Communication
- 1992-1993, “Latin American Artists of the 20th Century”, (traveling show)

== List of works ==
- La Estaca, 1960, mixed media
- Camembert Boxes, 1962, mixed media
- El Filmador, 1967, film
- El Túnel, 1971, immersive mixed media
- Engendro, 1972, mixed media
- Sandwich homus, 1972, mixed media
- Melba Cups, 1975, mixed media
- Anclada, 1978, mixed media
- Jean, 1984, mixed media
- Niños enveueltos a la Heredia, 1980, film
- Macho Tango, 1988, mixed media
