= Ernesto Deira =

Argentinian artist

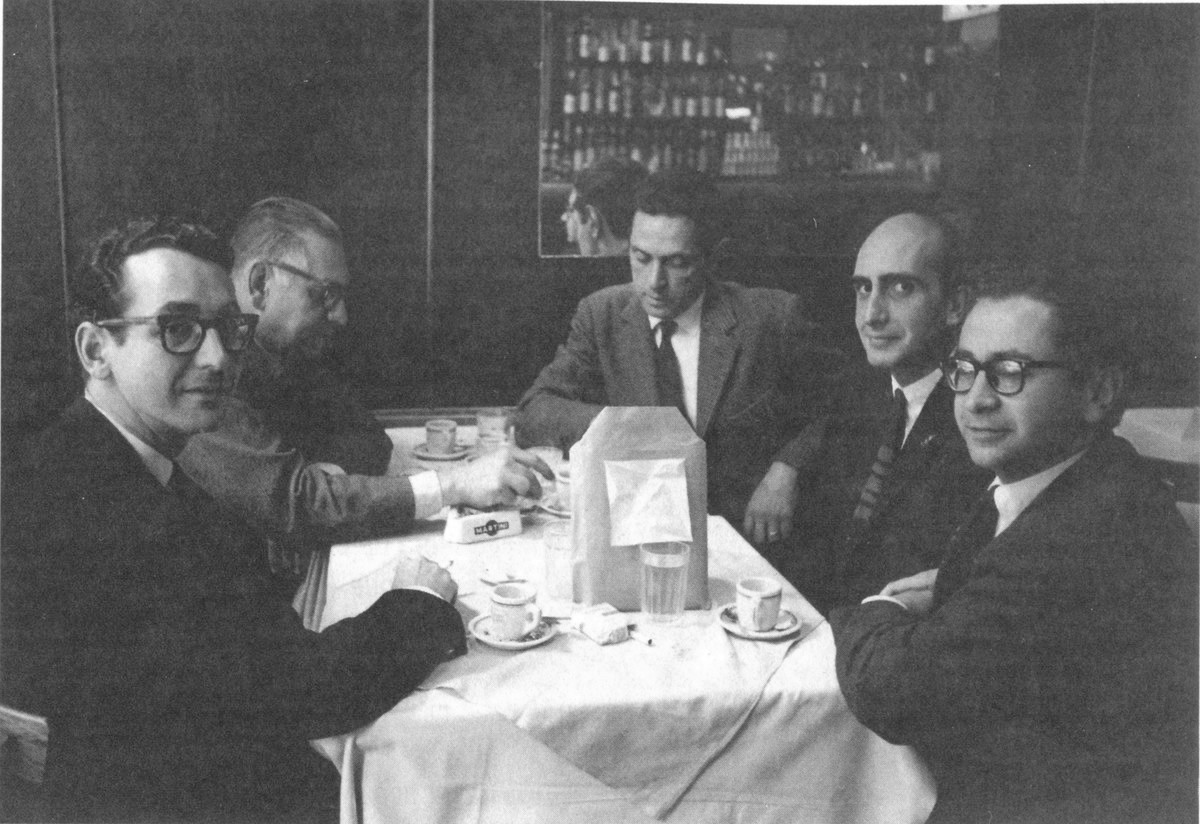
- (l-r) Luis Felipe Noé, Jorge de la Vega, Luis Seoane, Hugo Parpagnoli and Ernesto Deira, in Bar Moderno (1962).
- Born: July 26, 1928; Buenos Aires, Argentina
- Died: July 1, 1986 (aged 57); Paris, France
- Education: Colegio Nacional de Buenos Aires
- Known for: Drawing and Painting
- Movement: Neofiguration

Ernesto Deira ( July 26, 1928- July 1, 1986) was an Argentine artist associated with the Nueva Figuración (New Figuration) movement in Latin America. Together they called for a return to figurative art, rejecting both abstraction and traditional forms of representation. Deira's own style was highly expressive, linear, and often grotesque. Deira went to the Universidad of Bueno Aires and became a lawyer, but later turned to art. He studied with Leopoldo Torres Agüero and Leopoldo Presas in the 1950s. Then, in 1961, he joined Jorge de la Vega, Rómulo Macció and Luis Felipe Noé in an exhibition entitled "Otra Figuración". After the exhibition, they formed a group of the same name (Otra Figuración), which shared studio space and exhibited together until 1966. He later moved to Paris, where he died in 1986.

== Career ==
Ernesto Deira attended college at Coleigo Nacional de Buenos Aires. Later, he turned to pop art, expressionism, and informalism to define a style between figurative painting and abstract painting. Using this style, he addressed a range of themes–war, love, mythology–with images that were both passionate and critical. This had meant Deira had worked through many postwar art movements.

Deira was a member and founder of the Argentinian group Otra figuracion, also known as Nueva figuracion. The group was founded in 1961. The other founders included artists Jorge De La Vega, Rómulo Macció, and Luis Felipe Noé. One of the main objectives of the group was to reintroduce figurative art to Argentinian culture. The Otra Figuración group believed they lived in a collective society and shared the conviction that in order to make good art, the artist had to delve into himself. During Deira’s time with Otra Figuración, he and the other members of the group adopted free brushwork and drip techniques to combine various methods to create their surreal and expressionistic artwork. The artists used abstract, geometric shapes, bold colors, and mixed media in their artwork as well.

== Style ==
By the time of his second exhibition, in 1961, Deira was moving into an expressive figural style in which he painted portraits of distorted figures. In each of his paintings, they vary with how many figures are in each painting. Some paintings have a single figure or head, others have two, and still, others have a bigger group. In most cases, they look only vaguely human. They seem to be moving, but not with recognizable or specific motions. In his expressive paintings, he uses a lot of red, black, blue, and yellow. In Segundo Angel, for example, he painted a large figure, freely brushed with scarlet. He used thick brushstrokes in both the background and body, made with urgent stabs and twisting wrist motions. In his painting, The Roads to Freedom, he interprets human existence through visual means. He does this through layered splashes, thick brush strokes, and dripping colors. His thick brushstrokes work to catch the viewers eye. In Deira's painting, We Have to Escape Reality he painted a figure in the middle painted in white with bluish shadows. The figure has a stern, if not angry, look on his face. All around the black square, Deira has painted Spanish words in scrawling cursive writing using various colors – blue, red, and yellow.

== Identificaciones ==
In 1971 Deira created a series of seven paintings that he collectively labeled “Identifications.” These paintings mirror tragic political events in Latin America, Vietnam, and Bangladesh. The title responds to the severed hands of Ernesto Guevara that were used to identify his identity and confirm his death. The series was part of an exhibition in Chile when the military regime of Augusto Pinochet came to power on September 11, 1973. The paintings were then hidden to preserve their physical integrity. However, the whereabouts of the seven paintings remained unknown until October 2020. The following month, and with the help of Interpol, the paintings were returned to Argentina.

== Artworks ==
- Caronte, 1985, acrylic on fabric, 200 x 160 cm, Museo Ralli Marbella, Malaga, Spain
- We Have to Escape from Reality, 1968, oil on canvas, 195 x 130 cm.
- Metonimia, 1967, oil on canvas, 160 x 160 cm, Museum of Modern Art of Buenos Aires
- Untitled, 1967, colored ink on paper, 48 x 68 cm, Museum of Modern Art of Buenos Aires
- No. 1623, 1966, oil on canvas, 162.2 x 130.5 cm, Rhode Island School of Design
- Untitled, 1966.
- Adan y Eva N° 2 (Adam and Eve #2), 1963, oil and synthetic glaze on canvas, 78 x 58 cm
- Untitled, 1963, ink on paper 32 x 47.9 cm, Museum of Modern Art, NY
- La Viuda (The Widow), 1962, oil on canvas, 147.5 x 115 cm, Museum of Modern Art of Buenos Aires
- Otra Figuración (Other Figuration), 1961, print on paper, 23.4 x 22.7 cm.
- Untitled, 1960, oil on canvas, 90 x 70cm.
- Portrait, oil on canvas 80 x 64.8 cm.

== Exhibitions ==
- 2009 - “MoMA at El Museo: Latin American and Caribbean Art from the Collection of The Museum of Modern Art,” Museum of Modern Art.
- 2007, “Ernesto Deira: Retrospective,” Museo Nacional de Bellas Artes, November 29, 2007, February 18, 2008
- 1965, Deira, Maccio, Noé, de la Vega. Pinturas, Galería Bonino
- 1963, Deira, Maccio, Noé, de la Vega, Mueso Nacional de Bellas Artes
- 1962, Deira, Maccio, Noé, de la Vega. Segunda Parte, Galería Bonino
- 1961, Otra Figuración, Galería Peuser
- 1958, Solo exhibition, Galeria Rubbers
