= Luis Felipe Noé =

Argentine artist and writer (1933–2025)

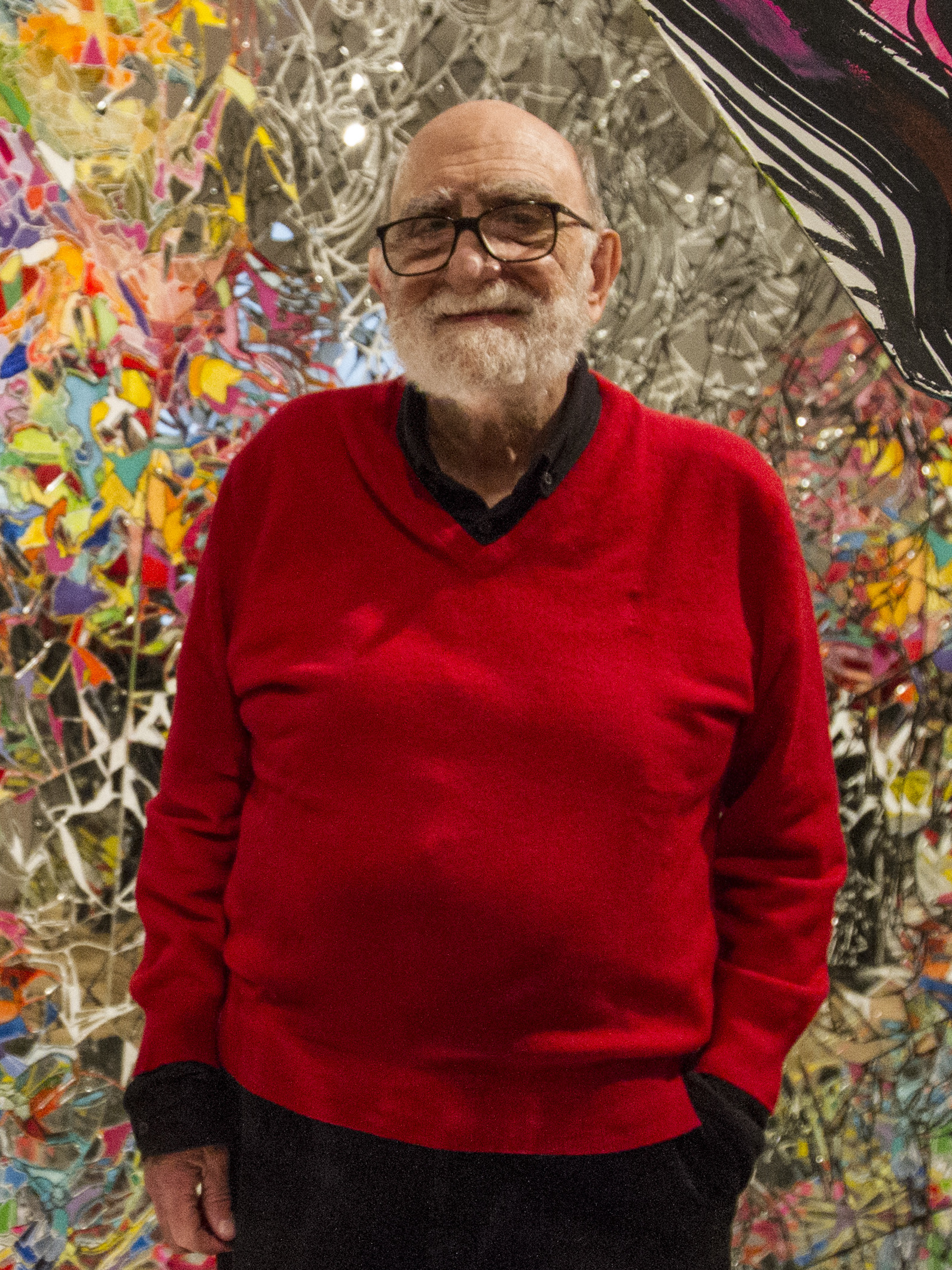
- Noé in 2017
- Born: 26 May 1933; Buenos Aires, Argentina
- Died: 9 April 2025 (aged 91); Buenos Aires, Argentina
- Known for: Artist and writer
- Movement: Neofiguration
- Children: 2, including Gaspar

Luis Felipe Noé (26 May 1933 – 9 April 2025) was an Argentine artist, writer, intellectual, and teacher. He was known in his home country as Yuyo. In 1961 he formed the group Otra Figuración (Another Figuration) with three other Argentine artists. Their eponymous exhibition and subsequent work greatly influenced the Neofiguration (Neo-figuration/New figuration) movement. After the group disbanded, Noé relocated to New York City, where he created and exhibited assemblages which stretched the boundaries of the canvas.

In 1965 he published his groundbreaking theoretical work, Antiestética. He then took a ten-year hiatus from painting and upon return to Buenos Aires opened a bar, taught, wrote and created installations with mirrors. His painting comeback coincided with the start of Argentina's last military dictatorship (1976-1983), and in 1976 Noé migrated to Paris to escape the dictatorship's widespread persecution and State-sponsored terrorism. In France he continued to experiment, both with canvas re-texturing and the drawing process. His later paintings move away from the figure and focus on elements of landscape.

Noé lived and worked in Buenos Aires, New-York and Paris. His son, Gaspar Noé, is a Franco-Argentine filmmaker. His daughter, Paula, is a painter. He died in Buenos Aires on 9 April 2025, at the age of 91.

== Education ==
Luis Felipe Noé studied painting with Horacio Butler from 1950 to 1952 but was "essentially considered self-taught." He also studied law at the Universidad de Buenos Aires and wrote art reviews for various newspapers prior to his first exhibit in 1959 at the Galeria Witcomb.

== Career ==
=== Otra Figuración (1960−1965) ===
==== Painting ====
In 1960 the artists of Otra Figuración began to live and work together in an apartment building that doubled as a studio in Carlos Pellegrini Street in Buenos Aires. The collective included Rómulo Macció, Ernesto Deira, Jorge de la Vega, Luis Felipe Noé and for a short while, Antonio Seguí who exhibited briefly with the group but is not generally considered a member of Otra Figuración since his style quickly diverged. The "violent, disturbing" work that emerged from the group's first exhibition at the Galeria Peuser in 1961, also titled Otra Figuración "reflected a nation whose history and everyday life were so marked by violent occurrences."

His two seminal paintings from this period are Introduccion a la esperanza (Introduction to Hope) and Cerrado por brujería (Closed for Sorcery), both from 1963. Esperanza won the prestigious Premio Palanza given by the Instituto Torcuato Di Tella in 1963. The painting depicts an amorphous, riotous mass of open-mouthed figures proffering signs that read "Champion, do not leave us," and "Vote for blind force," while additional signs set on plywood stems sprout from the top of the canvas and display portraits of political candidates. The work embodies nine separate canvases, communicating a sense of the overwhelming anarchy and continual unrest that defines Argentina's political process. The crowd forms one massive animal that blindly jostles and lobbies for some low level of survival, complicit in elevating the oppressors who cynically grin and bob far above them. In contrast, Cerrado depicts the people not as an indistinguishable mass but as individual grimacing visages trapped within a grid of boxes. The cloaked figure of a sorcerer looms above, nullified by a crucifix, surrounded by ferocious, fantasy animals. The iconography and structure of the painting suggest ideological incoherency and social chaos, belief systems or regimes continually supplanting one another and in flux while the citizens remain caged.

==== Drawing ====
An exhibition composed exclusively of drawings by the group in 1962, titled Esto at Galeria Lirolay in Buenos Aires had a significant impact on autonomous, experimental drawing in Latin American art. Otra Figuración emphasized process over technique. They influenced contemporaries Alberto Heredia, Cildo Meireles, Rubens Gerchman and Antonio Dias among others. The exhibit emerged from the political climate in 1962, one Noé likened to "social dislocation" and then linked to the "structural dislocation" apparent in the drawings. With the president of Argentina deposed by the military, Buenos Aires was once again in chaos and facing civil war. Emblematic of the exhibit, Noé's Sin titulo (Untitled) uses black India ink on pulp to create an artwork defaced with random slashes and blots, featuring rotund, distorted figures gathered around a black exploding center. Although the work appears to contain surreal elements, it's a true, psychological and emotional expression of Argentina's then current and seemingly perpetual social and political disorder.

Otra Figuración was officially discontinued in 1963, although the group continued to exhibit together until 1965.

=== New York (1965−1966) ===
Following Otra Figuración disbanding in 1965, that same year Noé received a Guggenheim fellowship that allowed him to relocate to New York City. He pushed his ideas regarding chaos even further at this time, creating huge, unsaleable and difficult-to-store assemblages—even throwing his work into the Hudson River. He also published Antiestética in 1965, a text explicating his theories on chaos, "the purpose of anti-aesthetics today is to split the concept of unity." In the introduction to the 1966 exhibition brochure at Bonino Gallery in New York City, Noé revised an earlier opinion on the fusion of figures, reflecting the contradictions in both Argentina and Latin America, writing that "the essential element of contemporary society is the tension and opposition among diverging cosmovisions, the fraternizations of opposing atmospheres."

The paintings in the show were prefigured by his 1962 work, Mambo, a deconstructed painting that featured the front and back of the work, an "inverted painting...hinting at another side of painting...abandoning neo-figurative painting." The 1966 Bonino Gallery exhibition included Three doors: distorted, haunted faces painted as isolated fragments on old, hinged-together panel doors—some with missing or broken panels, and also the huge, ironically titled Balance. This assemblage consisted of several large canvases, some lying on the floor, others propped precariously against each other or along walls, some with sections popped out and up from the canvas, displayed like fragile paper dolls on a stand. His attempt to order chaos had led to "pictures of broken vision."

After this exhibition, Noé returned to Buenos Aires and stopped painting entirely for almost ten years. The sabbatical is attributed to a combination of existential crisis and commercial failure.

=== Buenos Aires (1967−1976) ===
Upon return to Buenos Aires, Noé opened a bar (Barbaro) that was frequented by the literati. Even though he'd temporarily abandoned painting, his creative impulse never abated. Noé taught during these years and continued to innovate spatially, using distortion mirrors to arrange installations which he exhibited at the Museo de Bellas Artes de Caracas in 1968. The mirrors helped him to visualize the characters in his 1974 experimental novel Recontrapoder, a philosophical exploration of fragmentation, absurdity, power and aesthetics.

For Noé, life in Buenos Aires was absurd. Restoration of order meant empowering a repressive government, while protest resulted in riots and endless social upheaval. Ironically, one of the worst political crises in Argentina's history coincided with his return to painting. He said during the 1975 exhibition, "I feel...like a mirror facing both the ghost of a dead person and the future latency of an unborn."

Strife had escalated since the late 1960s, adding to Buenos Aires’ usual instability. Radicals, ex-Peronists, writers and intellectuals joined urban guerillas, creating even further havoc. Strikes, riots and economic collapse followed. The chaotic situation turned dire in 1974 when Isabel Perón took power and street fighting between right-wing death squads and guerillas surged. Bombings and atrocities became routine; riots were used as an excuse for military brutality and takeover. The coup in 1976 resulted in an estimated 9,000-30,000 "disappeared." Noé went into exile, relocating to Paris.

=== Paris (1976−1987) ===
Noé's art continued to evolve in Paris. Once again, he altered the frame of reference by re-texturizing huge pieces of canvas before painting, “crumpling and gathering, then stapling to the stretcher...creating a tortured surface for paint..” He also began painting expressive landscapes that reflected both internal and external turbulence, such as The Storm in 1982.

He experimented further with drawing technique in Paris, creating a "progressive, narrative transformation of the original image" by using a Xerox to copy multiple redrawn versions of an original. Works such as One Passion and Four Transformations were considered a return to Otra Figuración's platform, "drawing as process rather than mimesis and formal idealization."

=== Later work (1987−1997) ===
Noé returned, as always, to Buenos Aires in 1987 and continued to work with oversized canvases and landscape elements. His 1997 exhibition at Centro Cultural Borges and Galeria Rubbers in Buenos Aires consisted of a total of 60 canvases, all painted in 1997. Noé introduced a new visual element in this show, "violently colored stripes...to energize his landscapes." He also repeated the crumpled canvas technique developed in the 1980s to great effect in the painting Ominoso, a field of blue sporting streamers of crushed and painted canvas.

== Artistry ==
Stylistic hallmarks of Otra Figuración's version of Neofiguration are strong, vivid colors and spontaneous, slashing brushwork; fusion of fragmented and distorted figures with each other and animals; political content; extreme sense of kinesis and the appearance of anarchy on canvas. Structurally, the group made use of collage, mixed media, oversized canvases, and assemblages that gave many of the works a sculptural quality. Overall, the artwork managed to merge form, content, process and philosophy.

The philosophical platform of the group and its art are best expressed by Noé, "I believe in chaos as a value." He doesn't demonize chaos but acknowledges and accepts the reality of its inescapable existence. The group's art reflects the political instability and uncertainty of life in Buenos Aires and also, in a larger sense, an awareness of the precarious situation of all human beings living in the incoherent modern world. Noé proposed that in such a world, chaos itself must become an organizing principle. Noé embraces both political and human chaos in his work, fearlessly entering the eye of the storm.

=== Influences ===
Informalism was the predominant movement in Argentina at the time, and Noé's influences were the painters Sarah Grilo and José Antonio Fernández-Muro. Other acknowledged Argentine influences on both Noé and his fellow-artists who later comprised Otra Figuración, were the politically oriented neo-figurist Antonio Berni and the Boa group. The Europeans collectively known as Cobra, as well as Antonio Saura, Francis Bacon, Willem de Kooning and Jean Dubuffet may also have inspired the artists of Otra Figuración and are often referred to as comparable contemporaries in certain respects (de Kooning's brushwork for instance), although they obviously differ in others.

== Awards and honours ==
Noé was honored with a retrospective in 1995/1996 at the Museo Nacional de Bellas Artes in Buenos Aires and the Palacio de Bellas Artes in Mexico City.

In 2002 Konex Foundation from Argentina, granted him the Diamond Konex Award for Visual Arts as the most important artist in the last decade in his country. In 2003, he collaborated with Nahuel Rando on the graphic novel, Las aventuras de Recontrapoder, re-imagining his anti-hero for a new generation.

== Selected artworks ==
- Convocatoria a la barbarie (Summoning to a Barbarism)

From the Federal series, 1961
Mixed media on canvas
58 ¼ X 87 ¾ (148 x 223 cm)
Private collection, Buenos Aires

- La anarquía del año XX, 1961

Oil on canvas
115 x 229 cm
Museo Nacional de Bellas Artes, Buenos Aires

- Sin titulo (Untitled), 1962

Ink on paper
11 ½ x 15 1/8 (29.5 x 38.5 cm)
Collection Marcos Curi, Buenos Aires

- Mambo, 1962

Mixed media on canvas and wood
98 3/8 x 87 ¾ (148 x 223 cm)
Luis Felipe Noé, Buenos Aires

- Introducción a la esperanza (Introduction to Hope), 1963

Oil on canvas: nine panels, overall approximately:
68 ¾ x 7 5/8 (205 x 215 cm)
Museo Nacional de Bellas Artes, Buenos Aires

- Cerrado por brujería (Closed for Sorcery), 1963

Oil and collage on canvas, 78 ½ x 98 ¼ (199.6 x 249.7 cm)
Jack S. Blanton Museum of Art (formerly Archer M Huntington
Art Gallery), The University of Texas at Austin

- Algún día de estos (One of These Days), 1963

Mixed media on canvas
70 7/8 X 1181/8 (180 x 300 cm)
Private collection, Buenos Aires

- Nuestro Señor de cada día (Our Lord of Everyday Use), 1964

Mixed media
98 3/8 x 78 ¾ (250 x 200 cm)
Private collection, Buenos Aires

- That is Life, 1965

Collage with India ink and
colored pencils, 13 7/8 x 16 13/16
Collection Archer M. Huntington Art Gallery

- Balance. (fragment). Oil assemblage, 1964–65

Luis Noé papers, Buenos Aires.

- Three doors. Oil on doors, 79 X 29, 79 X 30, 79 X 20, 1964

Luis Noé papers, Buenos Aires.

- One Passion and Four Transformations, 1982

India ink and photocopy on paper
5 panels, one frame
17 6/8 x 58 3/8 (45 x 148 cm)
Collection the artist

- Tempestad (The Storm), 1982
- En la Marana, 1986

Acrylic on Canvas
200 x 250 cm
Museo Nacional de Bellas Artes, Buenos Aires

- Tormenta de la Pampa (Storm of the Pampas), 1991

Tribute to a passage written by Sarmiento (Diptico)
Mixed media on canvas
215 x 250 cm
Collection Amalia Lacroze de Fortabat

- Ominoso, 1997

Mixed media on canvas
79 X 98

== Significant exhibitions ==
Noé had more than 40 one-man exhibitions by the mid-1980s and also participated in numerous group shows. A few of the most notable are listed below.

=== One-man exhibitions ===
- 1959 Galeria Witcomb, Buenos Aires (his debut)
- 1965 Museo de Arte Moderno, Buenos Aires
- 1966 Galeria Bonino, New York
- 1987 Retrospective at the Museo de Artes Plasticas Eduardo Sivori, Buenos Aires
- 1995 Retrospective at the Museo Nacional de Bellas Artes, Buenos Aires
- 1996 Retrospective at the Palacio de Bellas Artes, Mexico City
- 1997 Centro Cultural Borges, Buenos Aires

=== Group exhibitions: Deira, Macció, de la Vega, Noé ===
- 1961 Otra Figuración, Galeria Peuser, Buenos Aires (Otra Figuración debut)
- 1962 Esto (drawings), Galeria Lirolay & Galeria Bonino, Buenos Aires
- 1963 Museo Nacional de Bellas Artes, Buenos Aires
- 1965 Galeria Bonino, Buenos Aires

=== International group exhibitions ===
- 1964 Guggenheim International Award, Solomon R. Guggenheim Museum, NYC
- 1964 New Art of Argentina, Walker Art Center, Minneapolis
- 1965 The Emergent Decade: Latin American Painters and Paintings in the 1960s, The Solomon R. Guggenheim Museum, NYC

=== Competition exhibition in Argentina ===
- 1963 Premio Nacional, Instituto Torcuato Di Tella, Buenos Aires (awarded the Premio Palanza)

== Writings ==
- Noé, Luis Felipe. Antiestética. Buenos Aires: Van Riel, 165 and De la Flor, 1988.
- Noé, Luis Felipe. Una Sociedad Colonial Avanzada. Buenos Aires: De la Flor, 1971
- Noé, Luis Felipe. Recontrapoder. Buenos Aires: De la Flor, 1974.
- Noé, Luis Felipe. A Oriente por Occidente. Bogota: Dos Graficos, 1992.
- Noé, Luis Felipe. El Otro, la Otra y la Otredad. Buenos Aires: IMPSAT, 1994
- Noé, Luis Felipe and Rando, Nahuel. Las aventuras de Recontrapoder. Buenos Aires: De la Flor, 2003. (Graphic novel
- Noé, Luis Felipe. Asumir El Caos. Buenos Aires: El Cuenco De Plata, 2024.

== Notes ==
- Ades, Dawn. Art in Latin American: The Modern Era, 1820-1980. New Haven & London: Yale University Press, 1993.
- Glusberg, Jorge. Del Pop-art a la nueva imagen. Buenos Aires: Ediciones de Arte Gaglianone, 1985.
- Lewis, Colin M. A Short History of Argentina. Oxford: Oneworld Publications, 2002.
- Lucie-Smith, Edward. Latin American Art of the 20th Century. London: Thames & Hudson Ltd., 1993 and 2004.
