= Jorge de la Vega =

Argentine Artist

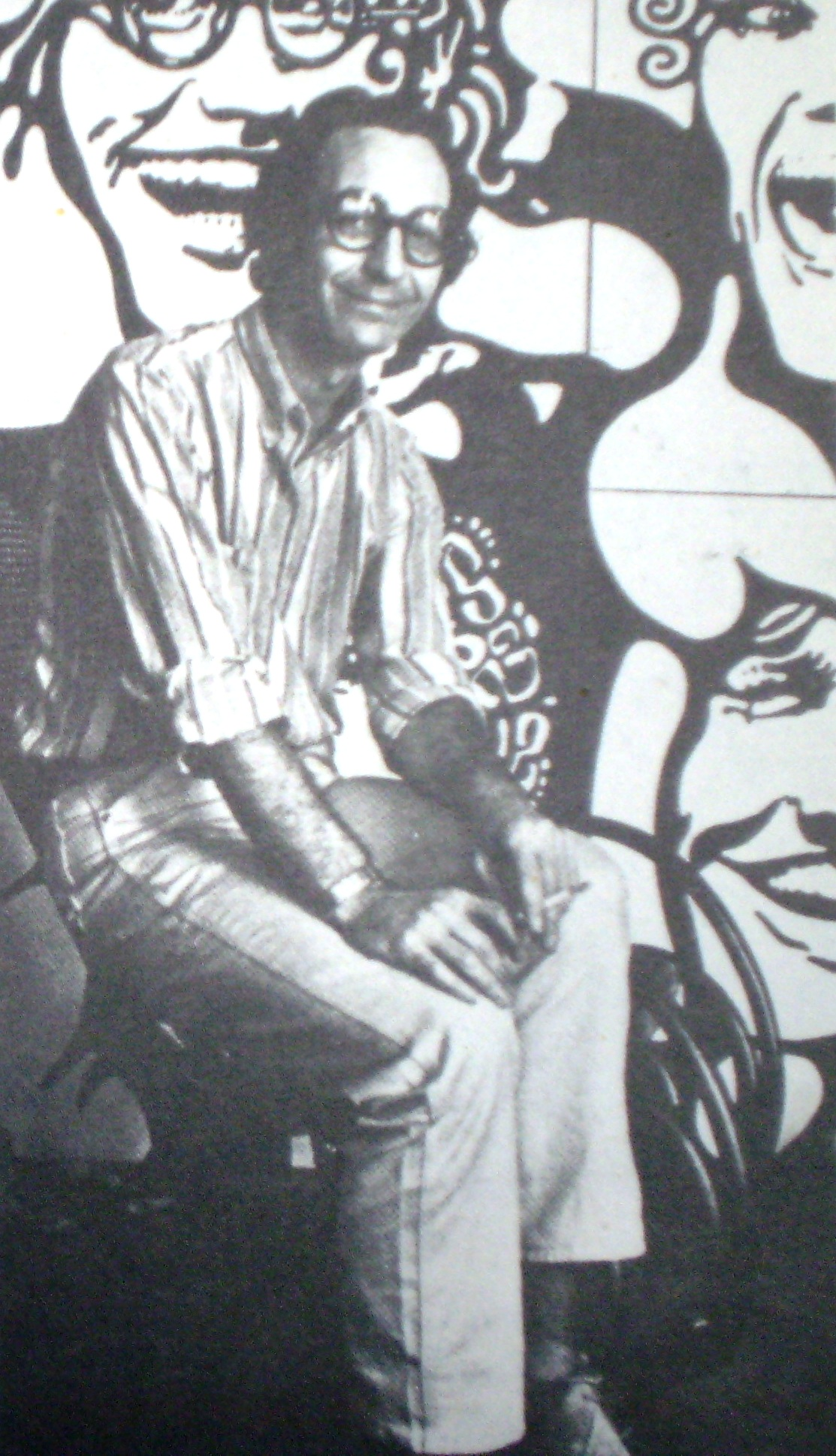
- Born: 27 March 1930; Buenos Aires, Argentina
- Died: 26 August 1971 (aged 41); Buenos Aires, Argentina
- Known for: Painter, Songwriter, Author
- Movement: Nueva Figuración
- Spouse: Pauleta de la Vega

Jorge de la Vega (27 March 1930 – 26 August 1971) was an Argentine painter, graphic artist, draftsman, singer, and songwriter.

Although de la Vega studied architecture in Buenos Aires for six years, he then became self-taught as a painter. From 1961 to 1965 he was a member of the art movement called Nueva Figuración. During his involvement in this movement, he became a member of the Otra Figuración group. In the final years of his career and life he wrote and sang popular protest songs which expressed his humorous view of the world. In addition to museums in Argentina, his works hang in the Phoenix Art Museum, the Museum of Modern Art in Rio de Janeiro, Brazil, and the Art Museum of the Americas at the OAS in Washington, DC.

== Biography ==
Jorge de la Vega was born in Buenos Aires, Argentina on March 27, 1930. From about 1948 to 1952 he studied architecture at the Universidad de Buenos Aires before quitting to pursue his true passion: art. He began creating his first art in the mid-1940s, and during the 1950s he created both representational and abstract geometric paintings. In 1961 he and three other Argentine artists created the Otra Figuración group which he worked with from 1961-1965. He traveled to Europe with this group where they were inspired to create a new form of art all their own. He later traveled to the United States on his own, and was greatly influenced by the Pop Art movement in New York City. During his time in the U.S., he also worked at Cornell University as a visiting professor/artist. Upon returning to Argentina he gave up the visual arts, and spent the last few years of his life as a popular singer/lyricist. He died in Buenos Aires on August 26, 1971.

As an artist, de la Vega may be best described in this quote by his Otra Figuración colleague, Luis Felipe Noé, after de la Vega's death (as a farewell to his close friend):

Jorge was a painter, Jorge sang, Jorge was a lyricist of the absurd and of chaos. That chaos which almost swallowed him at some point in his life. But with much sense of humor, with a great desire for health, for clean air, he overcame it; he redefined himself, through his constant method of turning things around. He started by turning painting around, showing a freedom very few have had. If one does not do what one wants in painting, where will he do it? he told me once. Then he painted a world of twisted and turned—around persons: that of the apparent consumerist society. With his eyes of artist from an underdeveloped country he looked at the most developed country and x-rayed it cruelly. He then sang that things should be turned upside down. He died when he was becoming aware that what had to be overturned was much more than painting, much more than himself: the entire society.

=== Education ===
De la Vega began his education studying architecture at the Universidad de Buenos Aires in Buenos Aires, Argentina. He studied there from 1948-1952 before deciding to pursue art instead, as a self-taught painter. He explored many styles (including Geometric Abstraction and Realism before joining the Otra Figuración group in the early 1960s. De la Vega received a Fulbright Scholarship to teach at Cornell University in 1965 and worked there as a visiting professor and artist.

=== Otra Figuración ===
In the 1960s, de la Vega was a member of the Otra Figuración (other figuration), also called the Nueva Figuración (new figuration), group of Argentine artists. The group was founded in 1961 as a reaction against the dominant tradition of Argentine geometric abstraction during that period and consisted of four men: Jorge de la Vega, Luis Felipe Noé, Rómulo Macció, and Ernesto Diera. The artists shared many goals, the primary one being the creation of a new art which would bring back the use of human form without simply mimicking the old styles, or slipping into the decorative styles of many other Informalist abstract painters. Their use of the figure allowed them each to express individual existential anxieties in their own way. Many of their artworks not only showed ideas from their personal psyches, but also their political views and general critiques of society; "the group's emblematic whale thus stands for spontaneity, creativity, and risk; in other words, all the qualities that capitalism took away from art."

The artist's first group exhibition, titled "Otra Figuración", was held at the Peuser Gallery from August 23 to September 6, 1961. At this exhibition, they published a public statement which said: "We are not a movement, nor are we a group, or a school. We are simply a few painters who feel the need to incorporate the freedom of the figure into our own freedom of expression. And, because we strongly believe in that freedom, we do not wish to restrict it with any dogmatic limitations, thus enslaving ourselves to ourselves. That is why we are eschewing a prologue. There is, however, a reason for being, an artistic driving force that has stimulated us to hold this exhibition. Through there is a common root to that artistic will, it is expressed individually, so each of us will examine ourselves elsewhere, and let the exhibition speak for itself."

In 1962, the artists traveled to Europe together, settling in Paris. Here they planned how they would create new forms of art and acted as creative influences to each other in their close proximity, de la Vega and Noé living together, and Diera and Macció sharing a studio. Unlike other artists of the figuration movement in Latin American art at the time (like José Luis Cuevas in Mexico), Otra Figuración wanted to explore psychological rather than objective conditions when exploring the nature of humankind. They did not see themselves as simply observers of the spectacle of the world, but active participants, believing that "the only way to adventure into is by adventuring into man himself".

While the group was often referred to as "Nueva Figuración" (New figuration), they did not like this name and much preferred to be called "Otra Figuración" (Other figuration). The difference may seem subtle, but they truly did not want to be mistaken for simply bringing back the old style in new artworks. Luis Felipe Noé described this best in the preface to the exhibition's catalogue, saying:

When I say otra figuración, I don't mean a reciprocated figuration. These days, men's faces are no different from the faces of their great-grandparents, yet man's image is not the same today as it was yesterday. In our time, man is not shielded by his own image; he lives in a constant existential relationship with his fellow men and with things. I think the element of relationship is essential to the idea of otra figuración. Rather that fading into nothing, things tend to blend together. I think of chaos as a virtue. Within the framework of that chaos, the figure in my work should be considered neither random nor incidental. Certainly, I believe that the human figure is worth pondering, but I am not endorsing a return to figurative.

As Noé describes here, the real figures themselves have not changed but the image of them never stops doing so. The figure, as it always was, must be looked at as it never has been before, taking into account the ever-changing social, economical, and political contexts of Argentina and Latin America as a whole.

== Visual art styles ==
A brief look at the different stylistic phases of de la Vega's artwork throughout his career (see below for example paintings).

=== Formación ===
1946-1952. "Pinto sólo cuando tengo ganas. Utilizo modelo, que me gusta dejar en libertad, para sorprenderlo en su gesto menos forzado. Creo que, en pintura, el tema es sólo un pretexto para lo que uno quiere decir. (I paint only when I want to. I use model, which I like to set free, in order to catch him in his gesture without it being forced. I believe, in painting, the subject is only a pretext for what you want to say.)" - Jorge de la Vega.

This phase of de la Vega's art was his first. It consisted of portraiture and was where he (as a self-taught artist) first began exploring a possible style for himself after leaving a prospective career in architecture. The paintings in this period used muted colors and often featured close-up views of detailed human faces with obvious emotions. This is a stark contrast to his later figures; colorful beast-like creatures and satirical Pop Art images.

=== Geometría ===
1953-1960. "Poco a poco, estructuré la imagen de manera cada vez más geométrica hasta llegar a despojar mis obras de todo contacto con la realidad visual física, buscando encontrar nuevos modos de relaciones en el dominio de los colores, de las texturas y las formas. (Gradually, I structured the image in an increasingly geometric way to strip down my work of all contact with physical visual reality, seeking to find new modes of relations in the domain of colors, textures and forms.)" - Jorge de la Vega.

These paintings are very characteristic of the Geometric Abstraction movement which was very influential on Latin American art at this time. Nothing about this phase was very political or made any kind of statement as to de la Vega's views (which he would later express more clearly in other styles).

=== Otra Figuración ===
1960-1962. "No fui exactamente yo quien introdujo figuras humanas en mi pintura; creo que fueron ellas mismas las que me utilizaron para inventarse; no fue una imposición involuntaria sino un encuentro natural y ahora no podría prescindir de ellas sin sentir cercenada mi voluntad expresiva. (It was not exactly me who introduced human figures in my painting, I think it was they themselves who used me to invent themselves, it was not an involuntary imposition but a natural meeting and now I could not do without them without feeling my expressive will severed.)" - Jorge de la Vega.

This phase characterized the early years of de la Vega's work with Luis Felipe Noé, Rómulo Macció, and Ernesto Diera (see Otra Figuración section above). His paintings in this time were informalist and colorful, and looked somewhat like the soon to come "bestario (bestiary)" phase, only without the use of collage, assemblage, or frottage (styles incorporated in the next phase).

=== Bestiario ===
1963-1966. "Quiero que mis obras choquen con el espectador con la misma intensidad con que chocan todas sus partes entre sí, por pequeñas que sean. Una ficha de nácar sobre una mancha. Un número junto a una piedra. Una bestia de oropel. Una quimera de humo. (I want for my works to collide with the viewer with the same intensity with which all parts collide with one another, however small. A sheet nacre on a stain. A number beside a stone. A beast of tinsel. A chimera of smoke.)" - Jorge de la Vega.

This style was characterized by the use of nontraditional techniques such as collage and assemblage to create "beastlike" figures which de la Vega called "Esquizobestias (schizobeasts)" or "Conflíctos anamórficos (anamorphic conflicts)". Anamorphic, in this case, means "something made unrecognizable by distortion, unless viewed from a particular angle", and many of these bestiarios were exactly that. De la Vega wanted the viewing of these distorted paintings to be like what one sees in a trick mirror. These paintings used glued, folded, and stretched fabrics and canvases, combined with paint and small objects, sometimes used to create a frottage effect. This technique allowed de la Vega to incorporate reality into his artworks, while still majorly exploring his own fantasies. He said about this style (in the catalogue of the 1963 Di Tella awards): "I want my painting to be natural, without limitations or formulas, improvised in the same way as life, growing in all places and doing whatever it wants, even if I don't want it to." His goal was never to narrate history, using these real life objects as a connection to reality, but rather to add them to his imagination.

=== Pop ===
1966-1971. "Los cambios me movilizan. En Nueva York cambié la temática: adiós a las figuras mitológicas y búsqueda del hombre. Norteamérica es un mundo tan poderoso y artificial que por contraste el hombre adquiere relieve. (Changes move me. In New York I changed the subject: goodbye to mythological figures and man's search. North America is a powerful and artificial world which by contrast man acquires relief.)" - Jorge de la Vega.

Upon moving to the United States for several years in the mid-1960s, de la Vega was greatly influenced by the Pop Art movement in New York City. In this phase, he strayed dramatically from his usual figurative style and began to attach faces from television, newspapers, magazines, advertisements, and other forms of popular media to "fluidly deformed bodies which entangled and intermeshed". This phase truly showed de la Vega's sense of humor, as a comical critique of consumer society.

== Singing and songwriting ==
In de la Vega's later years he became a popular singer/lyricist after giving up the visual arts. Two great examples of his work at this time of life are "Proximidad (Proximity)" and "El gusanito en persona (the little worm in person)". The editor's note preceding these works (as published in Inverted Utopias) clarifies: "This document and the preceding one are of interest not for their importance as poems, but because they illustrate one of the creative outlets chosen by Argentinean artists who, at the end of the 1960s, quit painting to circumvent the institutionalization of art. By then, the medium of painting had fallen short of their expectations, and their arguments had hit bottom."

=== Proximidad ===
"To be close, to be near each other, to come together, to hold and embrace each other, to brush against each other, to skirt and mingle with each other, to hold tight and squeeze each other, to huddle and cuddle each other, to gather breath, to approach and be included, to pile up, wrapped and knotted together, and renew, settle, and coexist together.

Let us unite and unify, let us combine and join ourselves, and blend together, let us gather and bind and collect ourselves, let us ally and link ourselves, let us reconcile and couple, adhere amalgamate, and shuffle, let us be screwed, steeped, and inserted, intertwined, intermingled and interwoven.

My mate: my companion, consistent, inseparable, conniving, confusing, approximate, converging, juxtaposed and adjacent, bordering and inherent, inclusive, included and subsequent: imagine how much people could do if the dictionary were less imposing.

Buenos Aires, 1968

Lyrics from "Proximidad", presented during the painter's first public performance as a songwriter-singer in De la Vega expone canciones (De la Vega exhibits songs) at Galería Bonino, 1968.

=== El gusanito en persona ===
For some time now the little worm has been squirming around not giving a damn about drawing at his feet that's slowly appearing in the grass that looks just like the little worm yet inside down.

Then one fine day he got so fed up with the enigma drawn that he started pulling at it and rolled up the lines into a ball that he used to have a simple suit woven on a loom.

When he presents himself like that, dressed as "himself" and brimming with optimism, we are obliged to ponder that the little worm "in person" is different to almost everyone in real life.

And this is what he has grasped well: A topsy-turvy world makes sense Only if you look at it all together and all at once and if you don't scatter your life: a fraction comme il faut, a fraction upside down.

Buenos Aires 1968.

Lyrics from "El gusanito en persona," included in his Olympia record Jorge de la Vega canta sus canciones, whose cover dressed the walls of Galería Bonino in its presentation (Buenos Aires, October 16–31, 1968).

== Selected artwork ==
(Formación phase) Retrado de su padre, 1952, óleo s/ cartón (oil on cardboard), 70 x 50 cm. César de la Vega, Bs. As.

(Geometría phase) Sin título, 1960, óleo s/ tela (oil on canvas), 100 x 100 cm. Museo de Arte Contemporáneo, Bs. As.

(Otra Figuración phase) El rescate, 1961, óleo s/ tela (oil on canvas), 195 x 129,5 cm. Marta y Ramón de la Vega, Bs. As.

(Bestiario phase) El día ilustrísimo, 1964, técnica mixta s/ tela (mixed media on canvas), 249,55 x 199,5 cm. Marta y Ramón de la Vega, Bs. As.

(Pop phase) Rompecabezas, 1969/70, acrílico s/ tela (acrylic on canvas), 100 x 100 cm, cada panel (each panel). Teresa Zavalía, Bs. As. (3 panels), Col. Jorge y Marion Helft, Bs. As. (2 panels), Marta y Ramón de la vega, Bs. As. (12 panels).
