= Rómulo Macció =

Argentine painter (1931–2016)

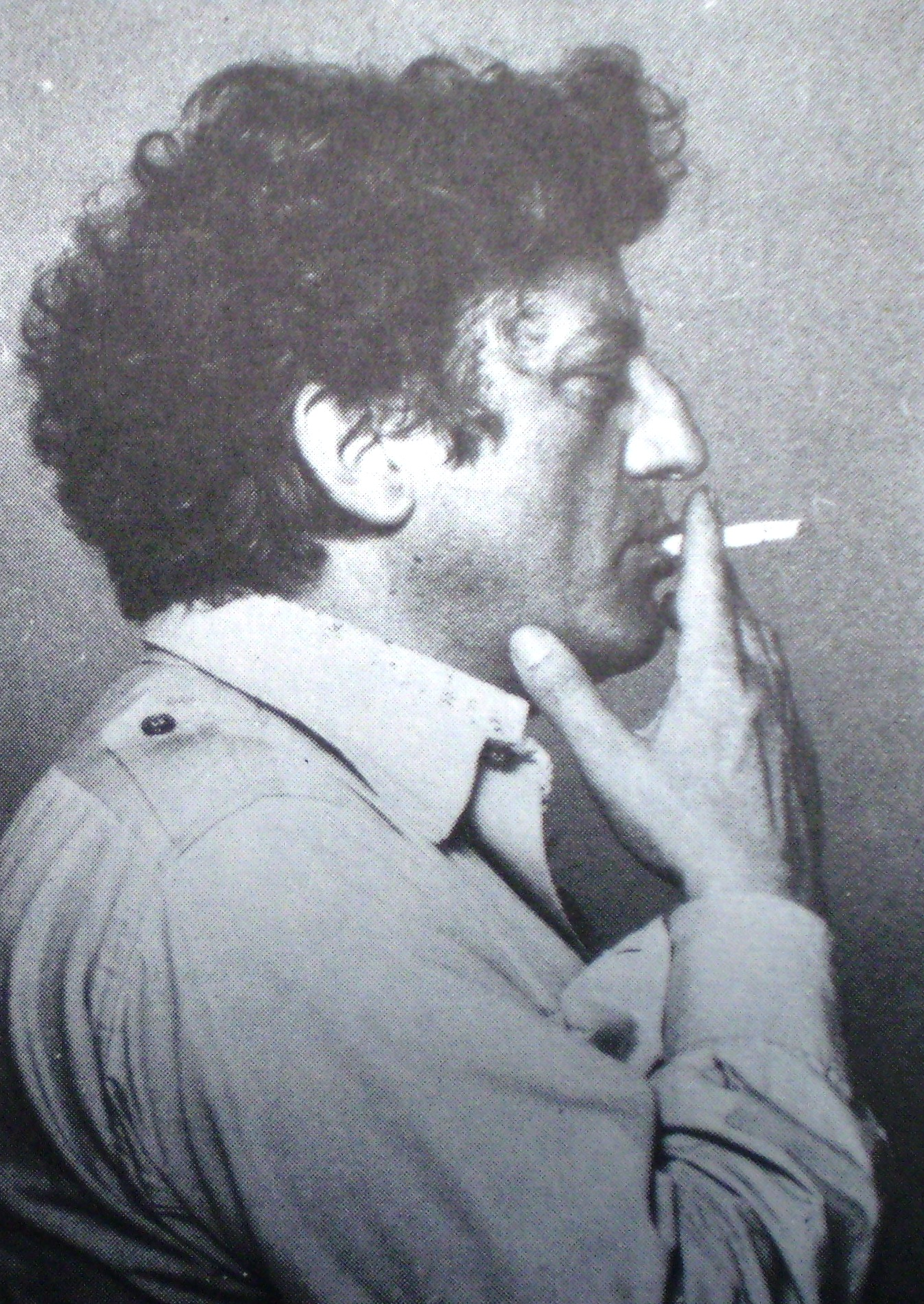
Romulo Macciò

Romulo Macciò (1931 – 11 March 2016) was an Argentine painter who was associated with the avant-garde art movement named Nueva Figuracion, which favored a new form of figurative art. Apart from Nueva Figuracion, he participated in another group called Phases. Helping pioneer the Nueva Figuración movement in the 1960s, these artists used figurative art forms to break taboos that constrained artists and their art-making, addressing important issues in Argentina and Latin America. After branching off from the group, Nueva Figuracion, Maccio would continue to develop his unique sense of art-making with an aesthetic of rebellion that would revolve mainly around social problems. He won the prestigious Konex Award from Argentina in 1982, 1992, and 2002.

== Life and work ==
Born into a middle-class family in Buenos Aires located in Argentina, his father owned a cardboard production factory. At the same time, his mom was a homemaker whom he greatly admired. Macció developed an early interest in drawing, was self-taught and was hired as a graphic designer at the age of fourteen. At the young age of fourteen, he became an apprentice for an advertising agency which would become a steady career lasting him for more than a decade. His advertisements were creative and focused on contemporary issues. Maccio then became a painter, but his career in graphic design had a lasting influence on his paintings.

His work started getting more attention and he mounted his first exhibition in Buenos Aires' Galeria Gatea in 1956, showing surrealist influences in his pieces. He joined a surrealist movement, earlier mentioned, being involved in the process of designing the magazine. After experimenting with surrealism, he worked on biomorphic versions of abstract art for a short period, which was rare to see in Argentina. He began taking a more expressive direction within his works not long after, focusing on "gesture and expression."

Macció's abstract art brought him to the attention of, among others, architect Clorindo Testa and he joined the Boa Group, one of a number of intellectual circles influencing local cultural life in those days. Maccio joined the Boa Group, the Argentine branch of the Paris Circle of surrealists. Boa published a magazine that was part of their movement. Maccio contributed by working on the magazine's designs and his paintings were also included in early issues.

Argentina's social issues heavily influenced Maccio's work, both his paintings and advertisements. In one instance, he directed an ad he made in 1959 in response to the economic crisis the country was experiencing because of increasing inflation. His advertisement represented applying, "rational thinking to complex solutions" in response to the financial crisis in Argentina. Maccio indicated using simple solutions at our reach under challenging situations. This solution was inspired by his mother, who was a homemaker who made use of all the items around their household. Maccio shared this solution as he'd seen his mother, a homemaker, make use of all the items around their household and urged others to do the same.

Continuing to be depicted in his artwork was a noticeable central head figure seen in ads such as for the Monde department store and another titled Cabeza, translating to Head in English. Maccio would illustrate his pieces using fierce, bold colors and graphic devices he's familiar with to paint heads or human figures in abstract settings. He also painted figures in fragments but would transition to painting them as if they were in the early stages of development in 1977.

Maccio was also heavily influenced by reading art magazines in the French Library with a studio companion. These art magazines informed him of Abstract Expressionism and Art Informel. In addition, attending open exhibitions allowed Maccio to broaden his views by observing international contemporary art from DeKooning and Vedova, Pierre Soulages, Antoni Tapies, and more. In his exhibition titled, "Fictions" Maccio acknowledged Argentine writer Jorge Luis Borgis sharing the effect Borgis had on him. During these years, he'd proceed to paint in a spontaneous Neo-Expressionist style.

In recognition of his art, he was awarded the prestigious De Ridder Prize in 1959 and the Torcuato di Tella Institute International Prize in 1962, his fame brought him close to other Argentine avant-garde artists, such as Luis Felipe Noé. He and Noé soon helped pioneer the Nueva Figuración movement that swept Latin American art during the 1960s. Later in 1964 he was also awarded the Guggenheim International Prize in New York. Later, Maccio would continue to do advertisement work with firms like Grant, Relator, and J. Walter Thompson.

Along with having the addition of Noe on their team, Maccio outwardly encouraged the members of his group to view Ernesto Deira's exhibition in late September 1960. Soon after, Deira would complete Nueva Figuracion as their fourth member. Maccio described Deira initially as an artist of strong energy showing his attraction to certain influences. He was always open to new styles and people throughout his career, which allowed him to develop his own work when the Nueva Figuracion went their separate ways in 1965.

A self-declared rebel against aesthetics in art, Macció described much of the genteel portrait and landscape art available at that time as "pink chocolate." Macció's tortured figures were often the dead or dying and were set against backdrops that suggested urban pollution and decay. Recently, his work has tended to center around social problems.

Macció's work continues to be displayed in Argentine and European galleries. There have been eight retrospective art books published on his work since 1969. A number of his works are in the permanent collections of the National Museum of Fine Arts in Buenos Aires, the Blanton Museum of Art and the Hirshhorn Museum and Sculpture Garden in Washington D.C.

Maccio was well received by critics internationally. In 1969, a New York Times review by Hilton Kramer wrote about his display saying, "we have a talent that can hold its own in almost any international context." Kramer does on to comment about Maccio's artwork, saying, "Mr. Maccio does bring together some elements of style that are more often than not pursued as separate pictorial enterprises."

Macció died at the age of 84 on 11 March 2016.

== Art works ==
1. Magazine Advertising Layout, 1959, Monde Department Store
2. La Bola Sobrela Ciudad (The Ball over the city), 1962, Ink on Paper, 9 7/8" X 11 7/8" Private Collection
3. La Costanera, 1993, Acrylic on Canvas, 97" X 100" Private Collection
4. Cabeza (Head), 1960, Oil on Canvas, 78" X 58 1/4" Artist's Estate
5. Carcel=Hombre (Prison=Man), 1961, Oil and Enamel on Canvas, 98 1/2" X 78 3/4" Private Collection
6. Buenos Dias (Good Morning), 1962, Oil on Canvas, 98 1/4" X 78 3/4" Private Collection
7. Gran papa o papa grande (Great Father or Big Daddy), 1962, Oil on Canvas, 79 3/8" X 67 5/8" Private Collection
8. Vivir a los saltos (To Live by Leaps and Bounds), 1963, Acrylic, Tempera and pencil on wood panel, 72 1/8" square
9. Vivir un poco cada dia (To Live a Little Each Day), 1963, Acrylic, Tempera and pencil on wood panel, 72 1/2" Museo Nacional de Bellas Artes, Buenos Aires
10. Otra Vez (One More Time), 1964, Acrylic on Canvas, 39 1/4" X 39 1/4" Private Collection

== Exhibitions ==
- 1967: Di Tella Institute, Buenos Aires
- 1969: Center of Interamerican Relations, Nueva York
- 1976: Modern Art Museum, Mexico DF
- 1977: Modern Art Museum, Paris
- 1987: National Halls, Buenos Aires
- 1990: Saint Jean Hall, Hotel de Ville, Paris
- 1991: Castello Sforzesco, Viscontea Hall, Milan
- 1996: Cuevas Museum, Mexico DF
- 1997: PROA Foundation, Buenos Aires
- 1999: Recoleta Cultural Centre, Buenos Aires
