= Antonio Seguí =

Argentine artist (1934–2022)

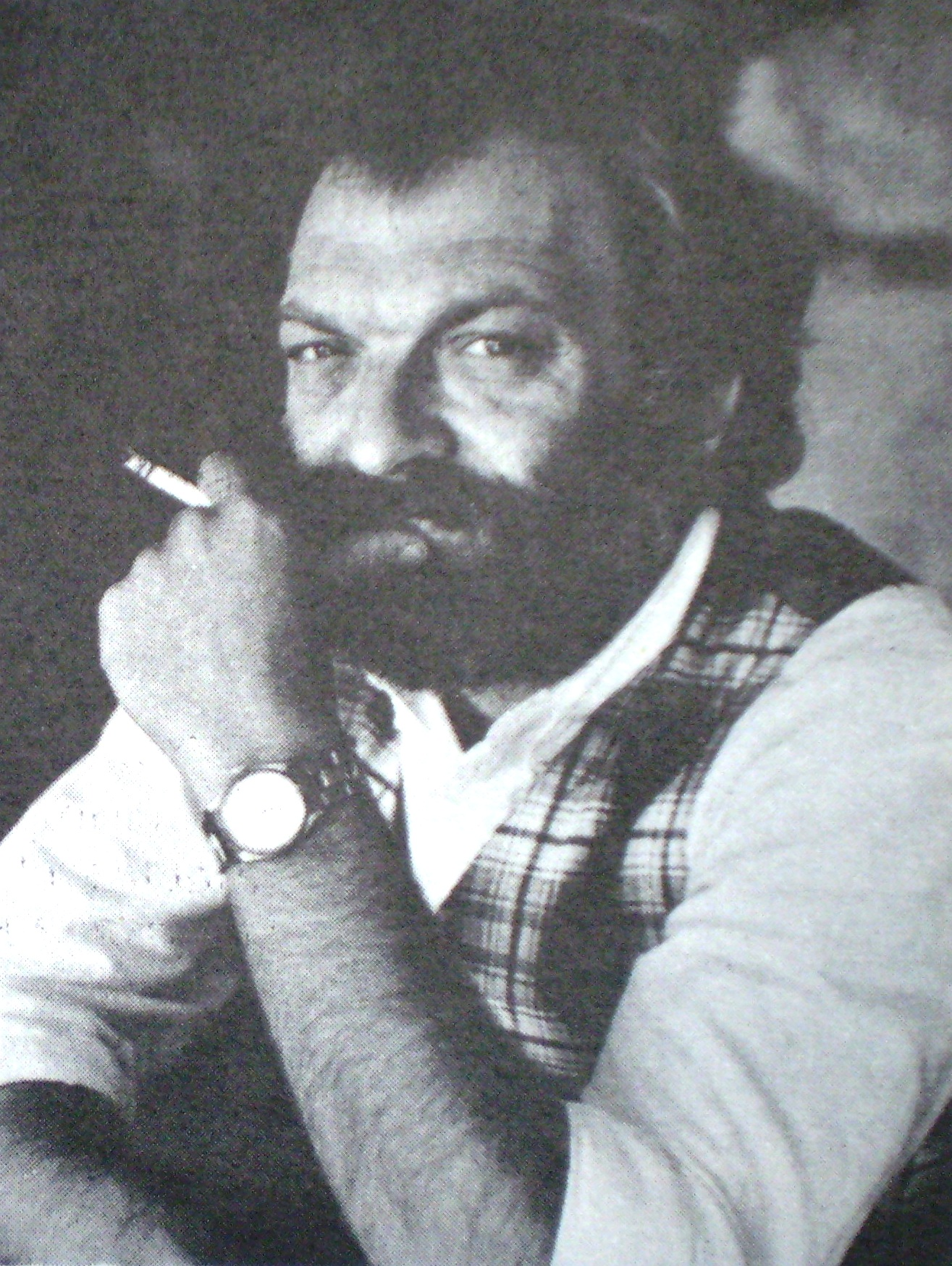
- Antonio Seguí, c. 1980.
- Born: Antonio Hugo Seguí; 11 January 1934; Córdoba, Argentina
- Died: 26 February 2022 (aged 88); Buenos Aires, Argentina
- Known for: Painting, printmaking
- Awards: Instituto Torcuato Di Tella Award (1989), Konex Platinum Award: Graphic (2002)

Antonio Hugo Seguí (Spanish pronunciation: [anˈtonjo seˈɣi]; 11 January 1934 – 26 February 2022) was an Argentine cartoonist, painter, engraver, book illustrator, and sculptor, who lived and worked in Paris. Seguí's work has been collected and exhibited worldwide in and by art institutions such as MoMA, Buenos Aires Museum of Modern Art, and Centre Georges Pompidou, among others.

== Biography ==
Seguí was born into a middle-class family in Córdoba, Argentina. The oldest son, he has three siblings. From 1951 to 1954 he traveled throughout Europe and Africa, and was a visiting student at the Real Academia de Bellas Artes de San Fernando in Madrid and at the École nationale supérieure des beaux-arts in Paris, where he studied painting and sculpture. After his return to Argentina, he became a member of the editorial staff of the journal Orientación, a Cordovan publication that supported the candidacy for the Presidency of Arturo Frondizi.

In 1957 he had his first single solo exhibition in Argentina. He traveled through South and Central American countries and studied printmaking in Mexico. In 1961 he returned to his home country, and in 1963 he moved to Paris, where he lived and worked up until his death on 26 February 2022, at the age of 88.

== Style ==
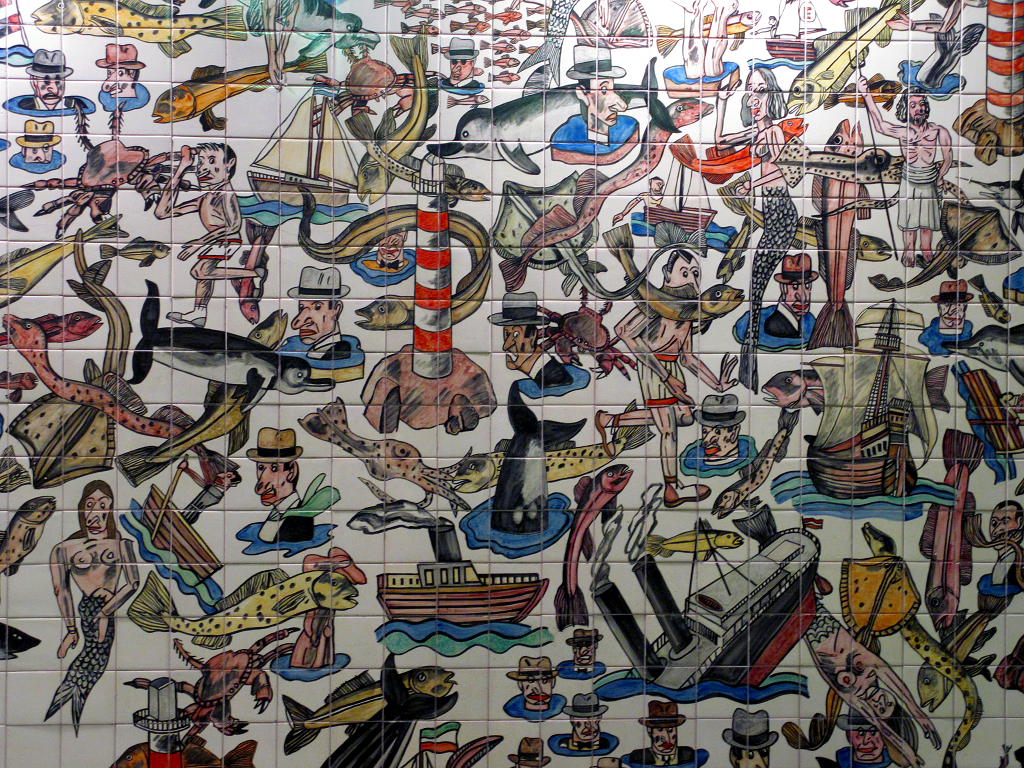
Mural by Antonio Seguí in the Metro Oriente, Lisbon.

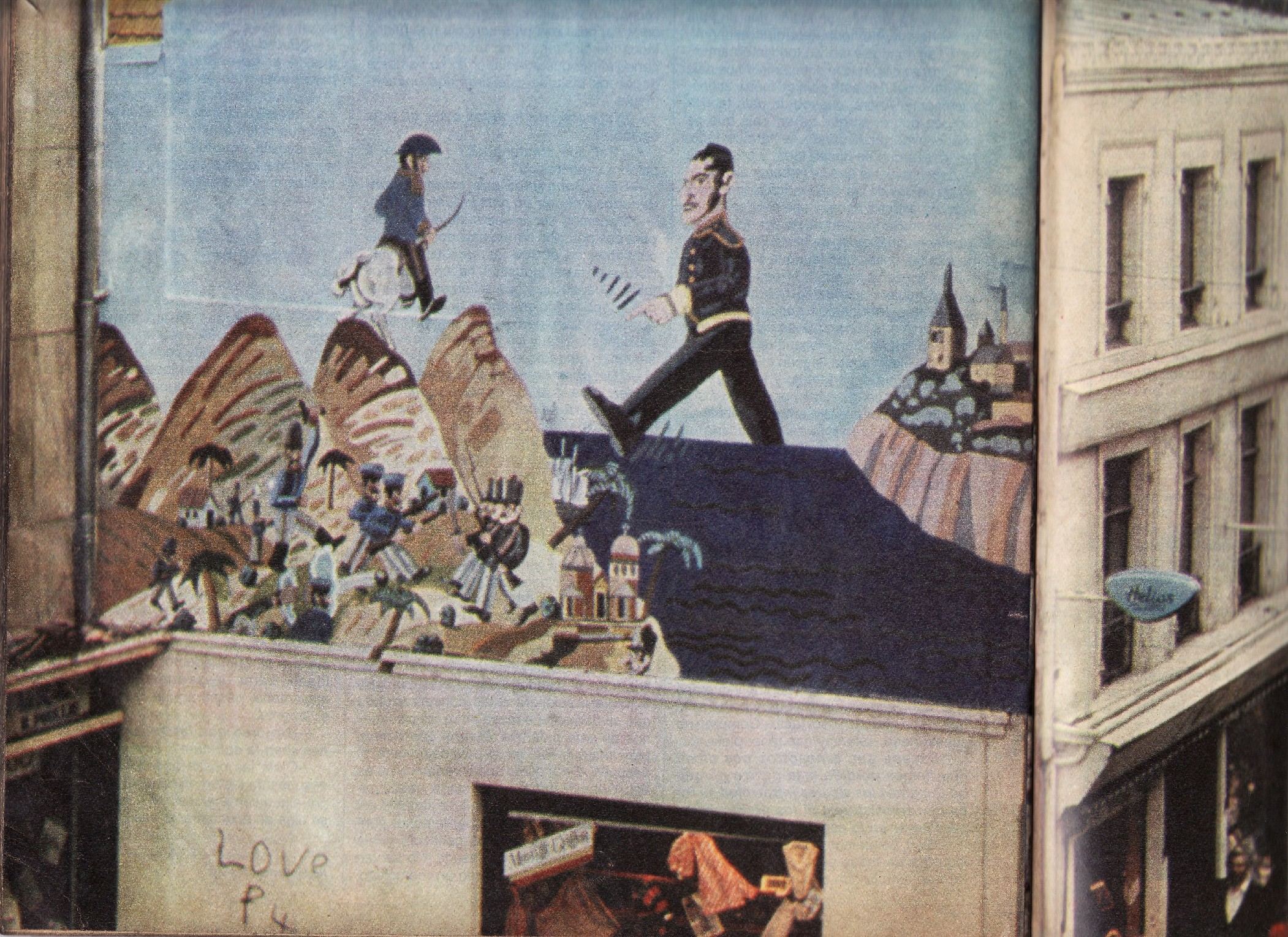
Mural by Antonio Seguí depicting José de San Martín, in Boulogne-sur-Mer, France.

Seguí’s works are generally possessed by a satirical sense of humor, critiquing society and human nature. Beyond this, Seguí’s art has lyric components which transcended his satirical intentions.

One of the most characteristic features of Seguí's drawings and paintings is the presence of little men wearing hats. The artist stated that this came from memories of his childhood, during a time when men always wore hats in the public space.

A recurring theme in Seguí's work is urban life and its inhabitants which seem like speedy automatons that take immutable routes leading nowhere. Up close, each figure is an individual, walking around and doing all kinds of things. But from a distance, the individuals form complex patterns in a labyrinthic landscape. In many of his works a vast crowd of figures coverins the entire surface area of the canvas, like in Gente de las azoteas (1992), Se llamaba Charles Atlas (2001) or Pasar desapercibido (2001). But with a large number of his canvases the focus is on individual figures, like Sacando la Lengua (1965) and EI Fumador (1966).

In many paintings and drawings he represented figures remembering tango, which was considered by Seguí, a primary Argentinian myth. He executed various works related to the story of Carlos Gardel. In various of these works, he seems to suggest a close analogy between dancing the tango and the act of painting.

Seguí’s artistic influences include Fernand Léger and Diego Rivera. From the 1960s on, Seguí followed a figurative tendency, but deliberately deformed the human figure, in a style that reminiscent of aspects art created by children and Outsider art. Some cubist techniques can be identified, in his repeated urban elements and in the importance of line and color to his work.

== Awards and honour ==
During his career, Seguí has received several awards and recognitions. Some of them are the following:

- Grand Prize awarded by the "National Museum of Western Art" at the V International Tokyo Biennial (1966).
- First International Prize of Darmstadt (1967).
- Grand Prize awarded at the Carcovia Biennial, Poland (1967).
- Grand Prize awarded at the Biennial of San Juan, Puerto Rico (1968).
- Grand Prize awarded at the Salon de Montrouge, France (1977).
- Konex Prize Expressionist Painting (1982).
- Instituto Torcuato Di Tella Award (1989).
- Grand Prize National Fund of the Arts (1990).
- Gold Medal XI Norwegian International Graphic Triennial (Argentine).
- Konex Painting Prize: Quinquenio 1987 - 1991 (1992).
- Konex Platinum Award: Graphic (2002).
- Corresponding Member of the French Academy of Sciences and Arts.
