= Lagrotta =

Lagrotta is a Hispanic surname. Notable people with the surname include:

- Blanca Lagrotta (1921–1978), Argentine actress
- Carlos Lagrotta, Argentine actor
- Frank LaGrotta (born 1958), American politician
