= Clandestine News Agency =

- Seal used in the agency's cables header
- Type: News agency
- Founder: Rodolfo Walsh
- Editor-in-chief: Rodolfo Walsh (June 1976 - March 1977); Horacio Verbitsky (March - September 1977)
- Founded: June 1976
- Ceased publication: September 1977
- Circulation: Clandestine

ANCLA (an acronym for Agencia de Noticias Clandestina, or Clandestine News Agency) was a news agency founded by Rodolfo Walsh that operated during the final military dictatorship in Argentina.

== History ==
ANCLA began operating in 1976 at Walsh's initiative, who invited Carlos Aznárez, Lila Pastoriza and Lucila Pagliai to start the project. With very limited material and human resources, the small group of journalists and Montoneros militants took on the task of challenging military censorship and repression between June 1976 and September 1977, reporting in real time with a sober and direct tone about the genocide being carried out in the country through more than 200 cables.

The agency reported on concentration camps, the discovery of bodies in lakes and deserted areas (even hinting at the death flights, although attributing them not to planes but to Navy ships), internal divisions within the Junta, economic policies, persecution, threats, exile, and the international response to it all.

Many of its members, including its founder, paid with their kidnapping, torture, and disappearance for their opposition to the totalitarian regime. After Walsh’s murder in March 1977, the kidnapping of Pastoriza, and the exile of Aznárez and Pagliani, the agency was led by Horacio Verbitsky and Luis Guagnini (who disappeared in December).

== Bibliography ==
The first book about this agency was published by Verbitsky on September 2, 1985: Rodolfo Walsh y la prensa clandestina, by Ediciones de la Urraca, publisher of the Humor magazine, where Verbitsky wrote. It reproduces the cables, the Open Letter from a Writer to the Military Junta and the first report on the crimes at ESMA, written by Verbitsky.

Researcher Natalia Vinelli also published her essay ANCLA. A clandestine communication experience led by Rodolfo Walsh. Editorial La Rosa Blindada (2002).

ANCLA. Rodolfo Walsh and the Clandestine News Agency 1976-1977, published by Ejercitar la Memoria Editores and compiled by Cacho Lotersztain and Sergio Bufano, gathers a significant portion of the cables issued by the agency, and includes Walsh’s texts Letter to my Friends and Open Letter from a Writer to the Military Junta.

== See also ==
- Buenos Aires Herald
- Humor magazine
- Nueva Presencia
- Left-wing terrorism
- Montoneros
