= Operación Masacre (film) =

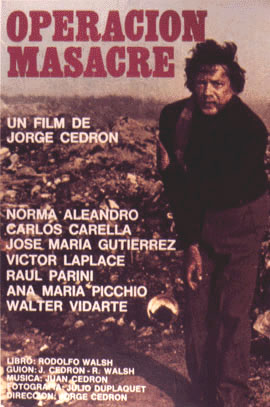
- Theatrical release poster
- Directed by: Jorge Cedrón
- Screenplay by: Rodolfo Walsh; Jorge Cedrón
- Based on: Operación Masacre by Rodolfo Walsh
- Produced by: Oscar Daunes; Jorge Cedron
- Starring: Norma Aleandro; José María Gutiérrez; Víctor Laplace; Ana María Picchio; Walter Vidarte
- Narrated by: Julio Troxler
- Cinematography: Julio Duplaquet
- Edited by: Miguel Pérez
- Music by: Juan Carlos Cedrón
- Release date: 27 September 1973 (Argentina)
- Running time: 115 minutes
- Country: Argentina
- Language: Castilian Spanish

Operación Masacre (transl. "Operation Massacre") is a 1973 historical drama film co-written and directed by Jorge Cedrón and based on the nonfiction book of the same name by Rodolfo Walsh, who also wrote the script. It stars Norma Aleandro, Víctor Laplace, Ana María Picchio, Walter Vidarte and Julio Troxler. It was filmed clandestinely (in hiding) from 1970 to 1972, during the self-styled "Argentine Revolution" dictatorship (1966–1973), and released when democracy was reinstalled in the country, especifically on September 27, 1973.

== Synopsis ==
In 1956, one year after the self-styled "Liberating Revolution" dictatorship deposed Argentine president Juan Perón in a coup, a civil-military insurrection failed in its attempt to take on the power in the name of peronism. In retaliation, in a vacant lot in the city of José León Suárez (province of Buenos Aires), several civilians accused of being part of the uprising are illegally shot by the dictatorship. However, seven people manage to survive and tell their story to the world.

== Cast ==
- Norma Aleandro - Berta Figueroa de Carranza
- Carlos Carella - Nicolás Carranza
- José María Gutiérrez - Norberto Gabino
- Víctor Laplace - Carlos Lizaso
- Raúl Parini - Police commissioner Rodríguez Moreno
- Ana María Picchio
- Walter Vidarte - Juan Carlos
- Zulema Katz - Florinda
- Julio Troxler - Himself
- Blanca Lagrotta - Pilar de Di Chiano
- Luis Barrón
- Miguel Narciso Bruse - Horacio Di Chiano
- Fernando "Tacholas" Iglesias - Guard
- Fernando Labat - Police commissioner Penas
- Carlos Antón
- Jorge de la Riestra - Lieutenant colonel Desiderio A. Fernández Suárez
- Enrique Alonso
- Julio Di Palma - Gordo Rodríguez
- Pachi Armas - Police officer Shorthand 1
- Hedy Crilla
- José Arriola
- Luis Barrón
- Leonardo Belin
- Raúl Bobbio
- Sara Bonet
- Rodolfo Brindisi - Prisoner
- Oscar Calvo
- Oscar Canoura
- María Cignacco
- Hubert Copello
- Martín Coria - Police officer taking a statement
- Héctor Dangelo
- Samuel Desse
- David Di Napoli
- Óscar Ferreiro - Juan Carlos Torres
- Mario Fogo
- Susana Langan
- Modesto López
- Luis Martínez Rusconi
- Pedro Martínez
- Manuel Mendel
- Rodolfo Morandi
- Edgardo Nervi
- Norberto Pagani
- Rodolfo Relman
- Luis Rondini
- Héctor Sajón
- Enrique Scope
- David Socco
- Guillermo Sosa
- Pepe Sterrantino
- Hugo Álvarez - Francisco Garibotti
- Mario Pinasco

== See also ==
- List of banned films
