= Fidelismo =

Fidel Castro's personal beliefs

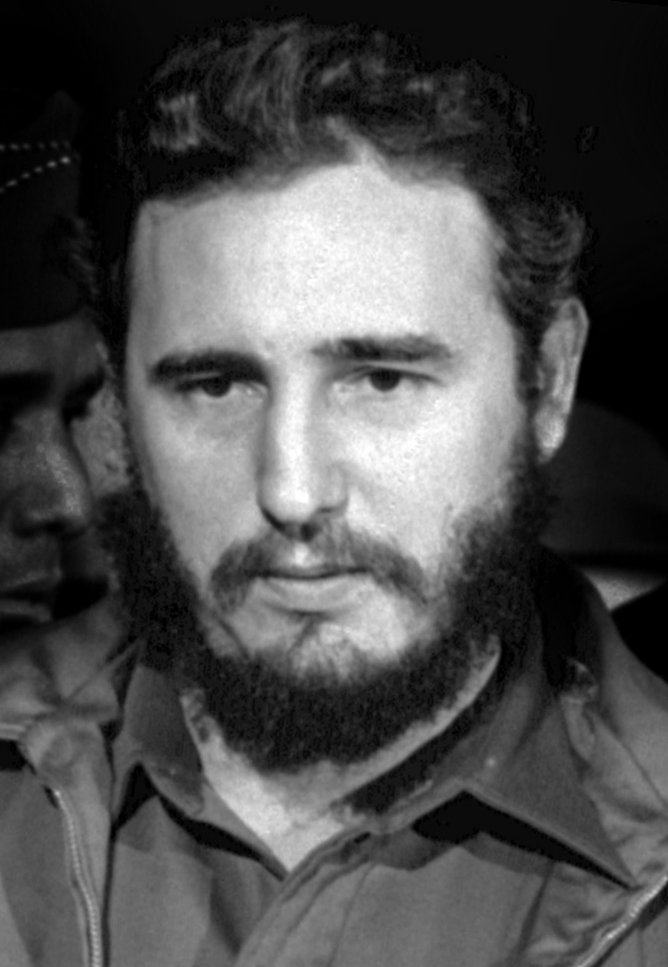
Fidel Castro, after whom "Fidelismo" is named

Fidelismo ("Fidelism" in English), also known as Castroism and Castrism (Spanish: castrismo), consists of the personal beliefs of Fidel Castro, which were often anti-imperialist, Cuban nationalist, supportive of Hispanidad, and later Marxist–Leninist. Castro described two historical figures as being particular influences on his political viewpoints: the Cuban anti-imperialist revolutionary José Martí, and the German sociologist and theorist Karl Marx. The thoughts of Che Guevara and Jules Régis Debray have also been important influences on Castro.

Castro's personal beliefs changed throughout his life, and went through a great deal of development after the Cuban Revolution. In the aftermath of the 1959 revolution, Castro stated to Meet the Press, that: "I am not a communist", and that he was a "revolutionary idealist". In early 1961, Castro stated in a speech that: "What the imperialists cannot forgive us, is that we have made a Socialist revolution under their noses". This was his first announcement that his government was "socialist". In December 1961, Castro said he was a Marxist–Leninist.

== History ==
=== Early influences ===
In his youth, Castro attended schools run by Jesuits, which he said "contributed to my development and influenced my sense of justice." Castro also stated that it was at his Jesuit-run high school that he became influenced by Falangism, the Spanish variety of national syndicalism, and its founder, José Antonio Primo de Rivera. Castro also participated in Hispanidad, a movement that criticized Anglo-American material values and admired the moral values of Spanish and Spanish American culture.

"What talent and abilities! What thought, what resolve, what moral strength! [Martí] formulated a doctrine, he propounded a philosophy of independence and an exceptional humanistic philosophy".

— Fidel Castro on Martí, 2009

In late 1945, Castro began studying law at the University of Havana. Admitting he was "politically illiterate", he became embroiled in the student protest movement. During his time at university, Castro has stated in his autobiography, that he became interested in the literature of José Martí, and Karl Marx. Castro said that from Martí he adopted: "Ethics, as a mode of behavior", and from Marx, Castro comprehended the "concept of what human society is", without which, Castro argued, "you can't formulate any argument that leads to a reasonable interpretation of historical events."

Castro became critical of the corruption and violence of Grau's regime, delivering a public speech on the subject in November 1946 that earned him a place on the front page of several newspapers. In contact with members of student leftist groups – including the Popular Socialist Party (Partido Socialista Popular – PSP), the Socialist Revolutionary Movement (Movimiento Socialista Revolucionaria – MSR) and the Insurrectional Revolutionary Union (Unión Insurrecional Revolucionaria – UIR) – he grew close to the UIR, although biographers are unsure whether he became a member. In 1947, Castro joined a new populist group, the Party of the Cuban People (Partido Ortodoxo), founded by veteran politician Eduardo Chibás (1907–1951). A charismatic figure, Chibás advocated national revolution, social justice, political freedom, and anti-corruption measures. Though Chibás lost the election, Castro remained committed to working on his behalf.

After a botched mission to overthrow Trujillo in the Dominican Republic, Castro's opposition to the Grau administration grew after returning to Havana. After violent clashes between protesters and police in February 1948, in which Castro was badly beaten, his public speeches took on a distinctively leftist slant, condemning the social and economic inequalities of Cuba, something in contrast to his former public criticisms, which had centered on condemning corruption and U.S. imperialism.

In the early 1950s, Castro's hopes for Cuba still centered on Eduardo Chibás and the Partido Ortodoxo; however Chibás had made a mistake when he accused Education Minister Aureliano Sánchez of purchasing a Guatemalan ranch with misappropriated funds, but was unable to substantiate his allegations. The government accused Chibás of being a liar, and in 1951 he shot himself during a radio broadcast, issuing a "last wake-up call" to the Cuban people. Castro was present and accompanied him to the hospital where he died.

=== Cuban Revolution ===
In March 1952, Cuban military general Fulgencio Batista seized power in a military coup, with the elected President Carlos Prío Socarrás fleeing to Mexico. Declaring himself president, Batista cancelled the planned presidential elections, describing his new system as "disciplined democracy"; Castro, like many others, considered it a one-man dictatorship.

Dissatisfied with the Partido Ortodoxo's non-violent opposition, Castro formed "The Movement", a group consisting of both a civil and a military committee. The former agitated through underground newspaper El Acusador (The Accuser), while the latter armed and trained anti-Batista recruits. With Castro as the Movement's head, the organization was based upon a clandestine cell system, with each cell containing 10 members. A dozen individuals formed the Movement's nucleus, many also dissatisfied Ortodoxo members, although from July 1952 they went on a recruitment drive, gaining around 1,200 members in a year, organized into over a hundred cells, with the majority coming from Havana's poorer districts. Although he had close ties to revolutionary socialism, Castro avoided an alliance with the communist PSP, fearing it would frighten away political moderates, but kept in contact with several PSP members, including his brother Raúl. He later related that the Movement's members were simply anti-Batista, and few had strong socialist or anti-imperialist views, something which Castro attributed to "the overwhelming weight of the Yankees' ideological and advertising machinery" which he believed suppressed class consciousness among Cuba's working class.

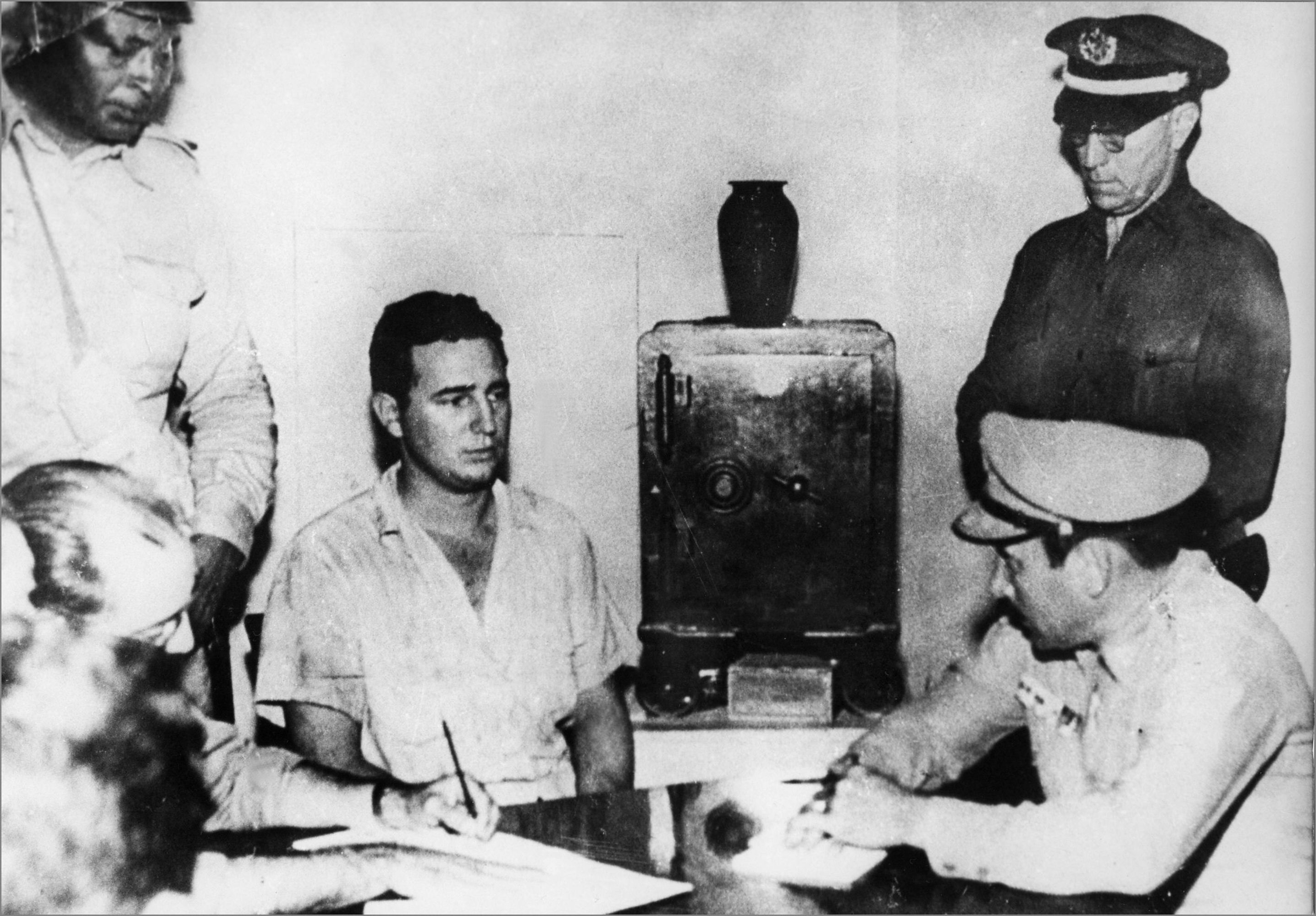
Castro under arrest for the Attack on the Moncada Barracks

In 1953, Fidel and Raúl Castro gathered 70 fighters and planned a multi-pronged attack on several Cuban military installations. On 26 July 1953, the rebels attacked the Moncada Barracks in Santiago and the barracks in Bayamo, only to be decisively defeated by the far more numerous government soldiers. During Castro's court trial for the attack, Castro presented a speech that contained numerous evocations of the "father of Cuban independence" José Martí, whilst depicting Batista as a tyrant. According to Castro, Batista was a "monstrum horrendum ... without entrails" who had committed an act of treachery in 1933 when he initiated a coup to oust Cuban president Ramón Grau. Castro went on to speak of "700,000 Cubans without work", launching an attack on Cuba's extant healthcare and schooling, and stating that 30% of Cuba's farm people could not even write their own names.

In Castro's published manifesto, based on his 1953 speech, he gave details of the "five revolutionary laws" he wished to see implemented on the island:

1. The reinstatement of the 1940 Cuban constitution.
2. A reformation of land rights.
3. The right of industrial workers to a 30% share of company profits.
4. The right of sugar workers to receive 55% of company profits.
5. The confiscation of holdings of those found guilty of fraud under previous administrative powers.

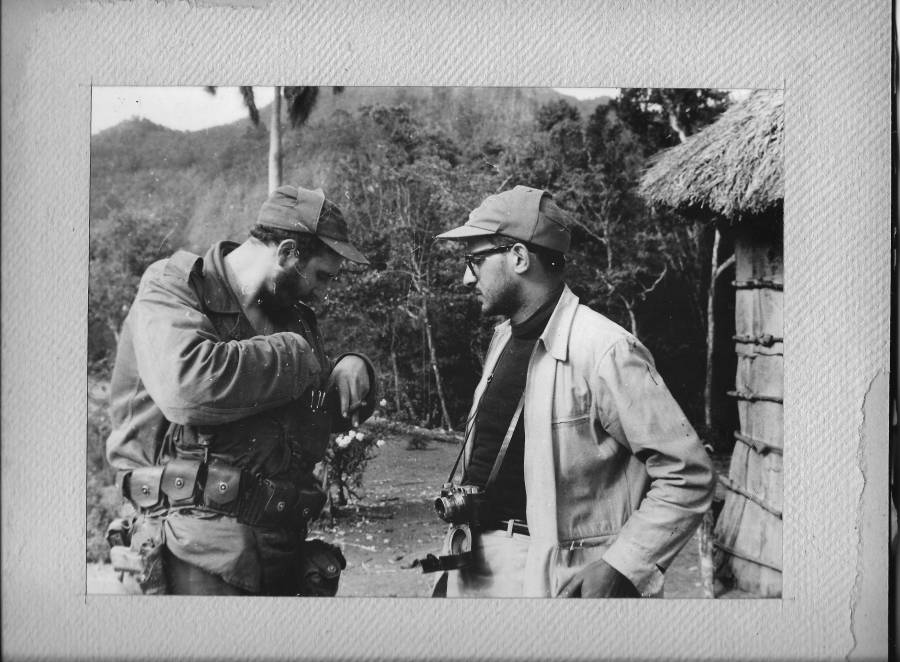
Castro talking to a reporter, while hiding in the Cuban mountains, 1958

After being exiled, Castro formed the 26th of July Movement, and returned to Cuba to overthrow Batista by guerilla war. The beliefs of Fidel Castro during the revolution have been the subject of much historical debate. Fidel Castro was openly ambiguous about his beliefs at the time. Some orthodox historians argue Castro was a communist from the beginning with a long-term plan; however, others have argued he had no strong ideological loyalties. Leslie Dewart has stated that there is no evidence to suggest Castro was ever a communist agent. Levine and Papasotiriou believe Castro believed in little outside of a distaste for American imperialism. As evidence for his lack of communist leanings they note his friendly relations with the United States shortly after the revolution and him not joining the Cuban Communist Party during the beginning of his land reforms.

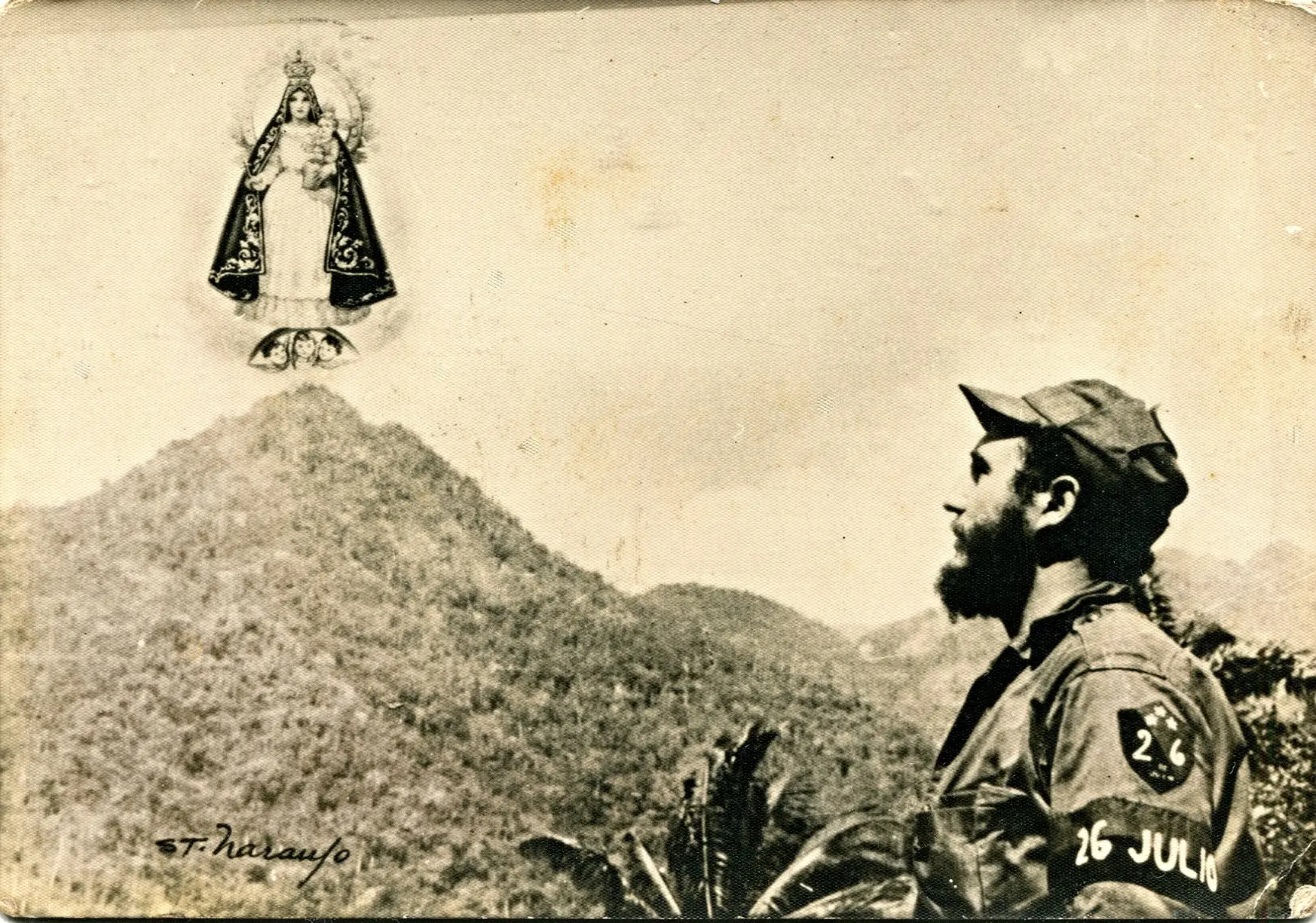
Promotional rebel postcard with Castro looking at Our Lady of Charity

At the time of the revolution the 26th of July Movement involved people of various political persuasions, but most were in agreement and desired the reinstatement of the 1940 Constitution of Cuba and supported the ideals of Jose Marti. Che Guevara commented to Jorge Masetti in an interview during the revolution that "Fidel isn't a communist" also stating "politically you can define Fidel and his movement as 'revolutionary nationalist'. Of course he is anti-American, in the sense that Americans are anti-revolutionaries". Initially the Movimiento 26 de Julio, along with Castro personally, were not primarily Marxist or Marxist–Leninist, instead favoring a broad front of progressive forces. Historians place Castro's adoption of Marxism–Leninism as happening around 1961.

=== Provisional government ===
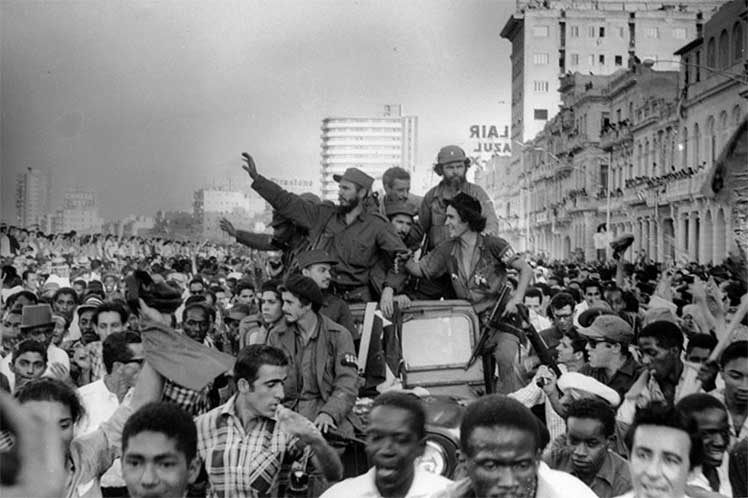
Castro entering Havana to cheering crowds, 1959

On December 30, 1958, General Cantillo privately advised Batista that he should flee the country. On January 2, 1959, Castro called for a general strike, and began his trek to capture Havana in his self-stylized "Freedom Caravan".

After the revolution, Castro made a series of statements defining his ideology and governing style. On January 11, 1959, television host Ed Sullivan would interview Castro in Matanzas and broadcast it on The Ed Sullivan Show. In the interview Ed Sullivan emphasizes the Castro and the rebels held a deep admiration for Catholicism, and Castro himself would comment that he was not a communist.

On January 15, at a Rotary Club meeting, Castro claimed: "I am not a communist", and that "Anyone who doesn't sell out or knuckle under is smeared as a Communist. As for me, I am not selling out to the Americans nor will I take orders from the Americans". He also claimed to revere Martí's belief that true independence comes from economic independence. During a televised speech on May 21, Castro stated: "Our revolution is not red, but olive green. It bears the color of the uniform of the Rebel Army which emerged from the very heart of the Sierra Maestra".

During the spring and summer months of 1959, communist and anti-communist polemics were exchanged in Hoy, the newspaper of the Popular Socialist Party, and in Revolucion, the newspaper of the 26th of July Movement. There was a skepticism about Castro's policies that was shared by the Popular Socialist Party, and their benefactors in Moscow, like Nikita Khrushchev. It was believed that Castro's cause against Batista was justified, but that Castro was "ideologically confusing", and that any radical economic actions would pointlessly anger the United States and endanger the doctrine of peaceful coexistence.

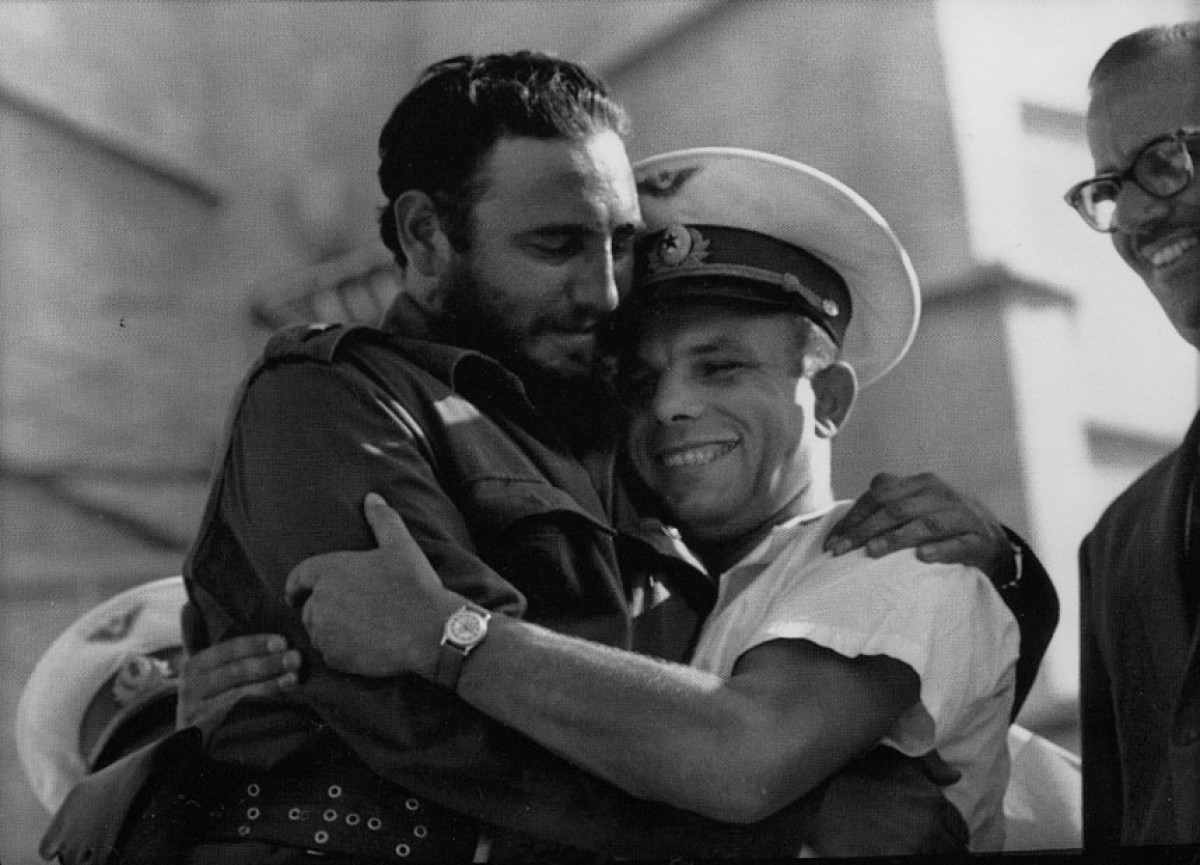
Castro hugging Soviet cosmonaut Yuri Gagarin, 1961

Past 1959, Castro's ideologically ambiguous rhetoric began taking a more radical tone, as relations with the United States continued to decline. After the Bay of Pigs invasion in 1961, Castro stated that Cuba needed a "new social system" that is "called socialism". Castro also began to shut down Catholic churches within the same year. In the Second Declaration of Havana of 1962, Castro outlined his basic conception of Marxism, and advocated for the export of the Cuban Revolution, whether or not the "objective conditions" existed in pre-revolutionary countries. This call for revolutionary export put him at odds with the Soviet leadership, which was afraid of overly-radical movements and international conflict. Fidelismo slowly became more politically popular in Latin America, as it was seen as an ideology of immediate revolution and land reform. Guerrillas in Guatemala, Peru, Venezuela, and Colombia took up arms while also adopting Fidelista sympathies.

== Opinions ==
=== Joseph Stalin ===
Although he adopted Marxism-Leninism, Castro remained critical of its ideologue, Joseph Stalin, who was General Secretary of the Communist Party of the Soviet Union from 1922 to 1953. In Castro's opinion, Stalin "committed serious errors – everyone knows about his abuse of power, the repression, and his personal characteristics, the cult of personality", and also held him accountable for the invasion of the Soviet Union by Nazi Germany in 1941. Fidel also stated that one of Stalin's errors was "purging the Red Army due to Nazi misinformation", which weakened the Soviet Union militarily on the eve of Operation Barbarossa. At the same time, Castro also felt that Stalin "showed tremendous merit in industrializing the country" and "in moving the military industry to Siberia", things which he felt were "decisive factors" in the defeat of Nazism and also in the transformation of the USSR into a world superpower.

After destalinization under Nikita Khrushchev, Castro aligned more with the Soviet position, which became a point of divergence between Castro and Castroist organizations in Latin America.

=== Christianity ===
Castro stated, "Christ chose the fishermen because he was a communist", and in his 2009 spoken autobiography, Castro said that Christianity exhibited "a group of very humane precepts" which gave the world "ethical values" and a "sense of social justice", before relating that, "If people call me Christian, not from the standpoint of religion, but from the standpoint of social vision, I declare that I am a Christian." Castro further believed that "faith is a personal matter that must be born in the conscience of every person. But atheism shouldn't be used as a rallying cry."

In his book "Fidel and Religion", Castro opines that there is a "great coincidence between Christianity's objectives and the ones we Communists seek, between the Christian teachings of humility, austerity, selflessness, and loving thy neighbour and what we might call the content of a revolutionary's life and behaviour." Castro saw a similarity to his goals with the goals of Christ: "Christ multiplied the fish and the loaves to feed the people. That is precisely what we want to do with the revolution and socialism", adding that, "I believe Karl Marx could have subscribed to the Sermon on the Mount." However Castro was critical of the historical role of the Catholic Church which he describes as "a tool for domination, exploitation, and oppression for centuries".

=== Israel and anti-Semitism ===
Throughout his career, Fidel Castro was an ardent anti-zionist, breaking ties with Israel in 1973, sending troops to fight in the Yom Kippur War alongside the Arab States coalition, and calling Israel's policies regarding Palestinians "genocidal" in 1979, though during the 'Special Period' economic crisis after the fall of the USSR in 1991, Fidel's positions on the Israeli-Palestinian conflict became more moderate as the Cuban government began to look to ways to alleviate the severe economic crisis and break the international isolation Cuba was going through.

In September 2010, The Atlantic began publishing a series of articles by Jeffrey Goldberg, based on extensive and wide-ranging interviews by Goldberg and Julia E. Sweig with Castro, the first of which lasted five hours. Castro contacted Goldberg after he read one of Goldberg's articles on whether Israel would launch a pre-emptive air strike on Iran, should it come close to acquiring nuclear weapons. Castro adhered to the consensus that Israel itself possesses nuclear weapons, called for Benjamin Netanyahu to join a global effort for nuclear disarmament, and warned against the dangers of Western confrontation with Iran in which, inadvertently, "a gradual escalation could become a nuclear war".

However, Castro "unequivocally" defended Israel's right to exist, and condemned anti-Semitism, a position which he said was shaped by his childhood experiences with belief in Jewish deicide. Castro criticized some of the rhetoric on Israel by Mahmoud Ahmadinejad, the President of Iran, under whom Iran–Israel relations became increasingly hostile:

I don't think anyone has been slandered more than the Jews. I would say much more than the Muslims. They have been slandered much more than the Muslims because they are blamed and slandered for everything. [Iran must understand] Jews were expelled from their land, persecuted, and mistreated all over the world, as the ones who killed God. The Jews have lived an existence that is much harder than ours. There is nothing that compares to the Holocaust.

Asked by Goldberg if he would tell Ahmadinejad the same things, Castro responded: "I am saying this, so you can communicate it." Castro "criticized Ahmadinejad for denying the Holocaust, and explained why the Iranian government would better serve the cause of peace by acknowledging the 'unique' history of anti-Semitism and trying to understand why Israelis fear for their existence".

In 2010, Fidel strongly denounced Israel's bombing of the Gaza Strip, comparing Israel's policies in the Gaza Strip with the Holocaust, which drew the ire of the Israeli government, leading to accusations of anti-semitism against Castro. Fidel would double down on his comparison in 2014, during the 2014 Gaza War.

== Public image ==
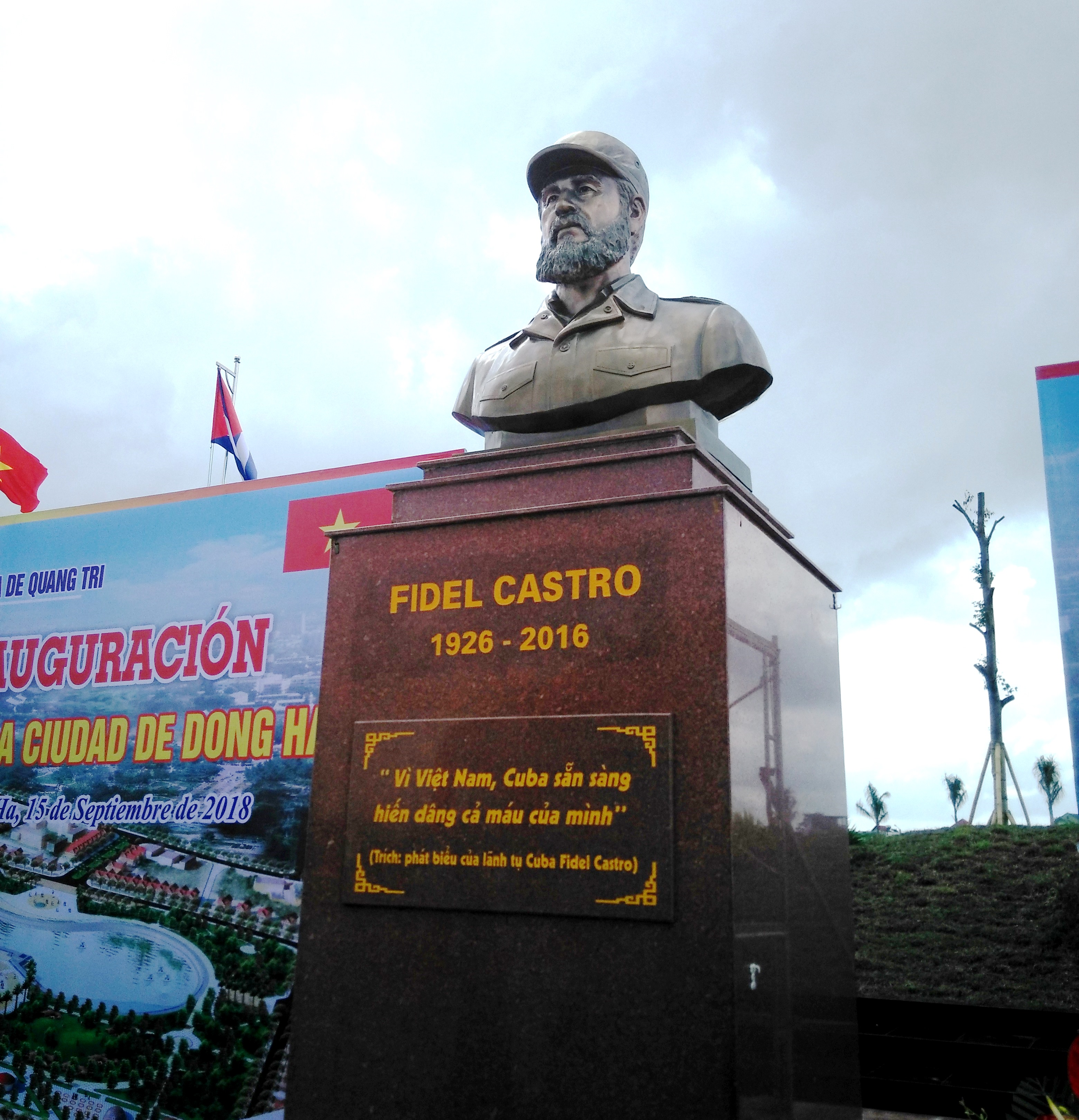
Fidel Park in Vietnam

By wearing military-style uniforms and leading mass demonstrations, Castro projected an image of a perpetual revolutionary. He was mostly seen in military attire, but his personal tailor, Merel Van 't Wout, convinced him to occasionally change to a business suit. Castro is often referred to as "Comandante" ("Commander"), but is also nicknamed "El Caballo" ("The Horse"), a label that was first attributed to Cuban entertainer Benny Moré, who, on hearing Castro passing in the Havana night with his entourage, shouted out: "Here comes the horse!"

During the Cuban Revolution campaign, fellow rebels knew Castro as "The Giant". Large throngs of people gathered to cheer at Castro's fiery speeches, which typically lasted for hours. Many details of Castro's private life, particularly involving his family members, are scarce, as the media is forbidden to mention them. Castro was determined to avoid the creation of a cult of personality around himself. Few public images of Castro are visible around Cuba, and his birthday is not celebrated. Instead, dead revolutionaries, such as Che Guevara and Camilo Cienfuegos, are celebrated.

Throughout his political career, Castro took a relatively socially conservative stance on many issues, opposing drug use, gambling, and prostitution, which he viewed as moral evils. Instead, he advocated hard work, family values, integrity, and self-discipline. Although his government repressed homosexuality for decades, later in his life, he took responsibility for this persecution, regretting it as a "great injustice", as he himself put it.

== Post-Castro ==
Since Fidel Castro's younger brother Raúl Castro took over leadership responsibility in the Party and Cuba in July 2006, observers have pointed out the politically significant differences between the decades-long companions (most significantly a move to a market-socialist economy) and have used the terms "Fidelism" (Spanish: Fidelismo), "Post-Fidelism" and "Raúlism" (Spanish: Raúlismo) to distinguish these changes, while official Cuban sources emphasize continuity in the political system.

== Castroist organizations ==
The Socialist Workers Party in the United States follows a Castroist position. The Revolutionary Left Movement of Chile, during the presidency of Salvador Allende, criticized his government from a Castroist position.

== Assessments ==
Considering the range of ideological statements made by Castro, scholars have attempted to summarize the core themes of Fidelismo. Lillian Guerra argues that "Fidelismo" developed only after the Cuban Revolution, as a nationalistic "popular religion" that was used to legitimize Castro's government and supported Castro's political millenarianism, and demands for national sacrifice. Marina Gold states that Fidelismo was a political system legitimized only by the charismatic authority of Fidel Castro.

Defining the personal beliefs of Castro has been a somewhat difficult task, with historians arguing over Castro's sincerity. The historian Tad Szulc has stated that during the Cuban Revolution, Castro was a closet communist, and never a liberal republican. According to Szulc, Castro was conspiring with the Popular Socialist Party since early 1959. Other scholars like Samuel Farber, and Katherine Gordy, argue that Castro did not conspire, or manipulate the public by stating he was "not a communist", and that his ideological evolution was instead done to assist the consolidation of the Cuban Revolution. There was no conspiracy to hide his true communist leanings, because they did not exist at the time.

Because of Castro's shifting ideology throughout his political career, from republicanism to communism, many historians have argued that Fidelismo is not a succinct ideology in and of itself, with Theodore Draper arguing that "Castroism" is simply a self-contradictory collection of declarations supporting Castro's rule in Cuba; ultimately only principled in opportunism. Andrés Oppenheimer, Roland H. Ebel, Ray Taras, and James D. Cochrane, all claim that Fidelismo only consistently represents a cult of personality around Fidel Castro. Volker Skierka contends that Fidelismo is not even a variant of Marxism-Leninism, but just the veneration of Fidel Castro's caudillo rule.

== See also ==
- Religious views of Fidel Castro
- Communist Party of Cuba
