= Prensa Latina =

Official state news agency of Cuba

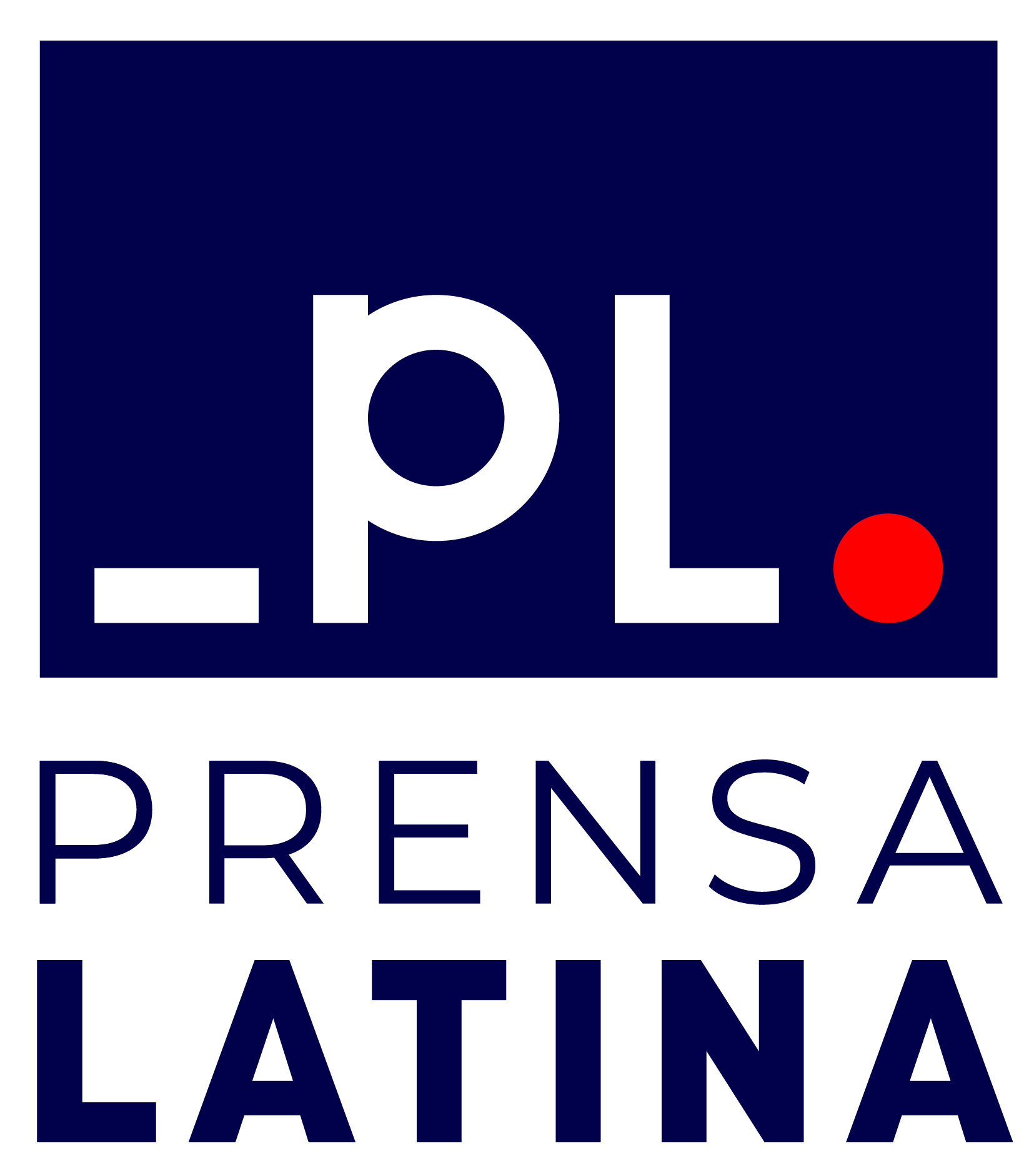
- Established: March 1959
- Headquarters: Havana, Cuba
- Owner: Cuban government
- Website: www.prensa-latina.cu; www.plenglish.com

Agencia de Noticias Latinoamericana S.A. (lit. 'Latin American News Agency'), trading as Prensa Latina, is the official state news agency of Cuba, founded in March 1959 shortly after the Cuban Revolution.

== Overview ==
In a speech by Fidel Castro in Santiago de Cuba in 1959, Castro denounced the United States media and instead favoured a Latin American service "written in our own language". According to Servando González, the creation of the agency was similar to that of Agencia Latina founded by Juan Perón.

Prensa Latina was founded at the initiative of Ernesto Che Guevara. The founder and first manager was Argentinian journalist Jorge Ricardo Masetti. On Masetti's instructions, the first journalists were recruited by March 1959, when the service went into operation. Among the initial group of journalists were Gabriel García Márquez, Rodolfo Walsh, Plinio Apuleyo Mendoza, Rogelio García Lupo, Aroldo Wall, Leonardo Acosta and Carlos María Gutiérrez.

Prensa Latina had its license revoked in the United States in 1969, in retaliation after the Cuban government closed down Associated Press and United Press International bureaus in Havana. These offices have since reopened and function intermittently.

Officials working at the agency are usually affiliated with the Dirección de Inteligencia (DI). The history of the agency is also intertwined with Cuba's foreign relations. On occasion, several bureau chiefs abroad have been deported on charges of espionage, including agency staff from Peru, Canada and Jamaica.

== Functions ==
"Prensa Latina is part of the Cuban Revolution since it was born with the revolutionary process."

— Frank Gonzalez, Prensa Latina Former President

All mass media in Cuba receive their information from the agency. The agency regularly relays speeches from Fidel Castro and other government officials, and reports on state activities. The organisation also disseminates information about Latin Americas relations with Cuba and the revolution.

Prensa Latina has its central office in Havana, Cuba, and its goal is to provide an alternative news source of international topics and events. The agency also has an additional 40 overseas offices, most of them in Latin America.

A daily news service is provided by the agency, with information on economic, financial and commercial news. They also publish a daily English-language "Cuba News in Brief" and "Cuba Direct", which provide translations of articles regarding Cuban news, politics, culture, sports and art. Other features include tourism news, medical news, women's issues, and coverage of Cuban and Caribbean science and medicine.

== See also ==
- Media of Cuba
- Communications in Cuba
