= Rodolfo Walsh =

Argentine writer and journalist

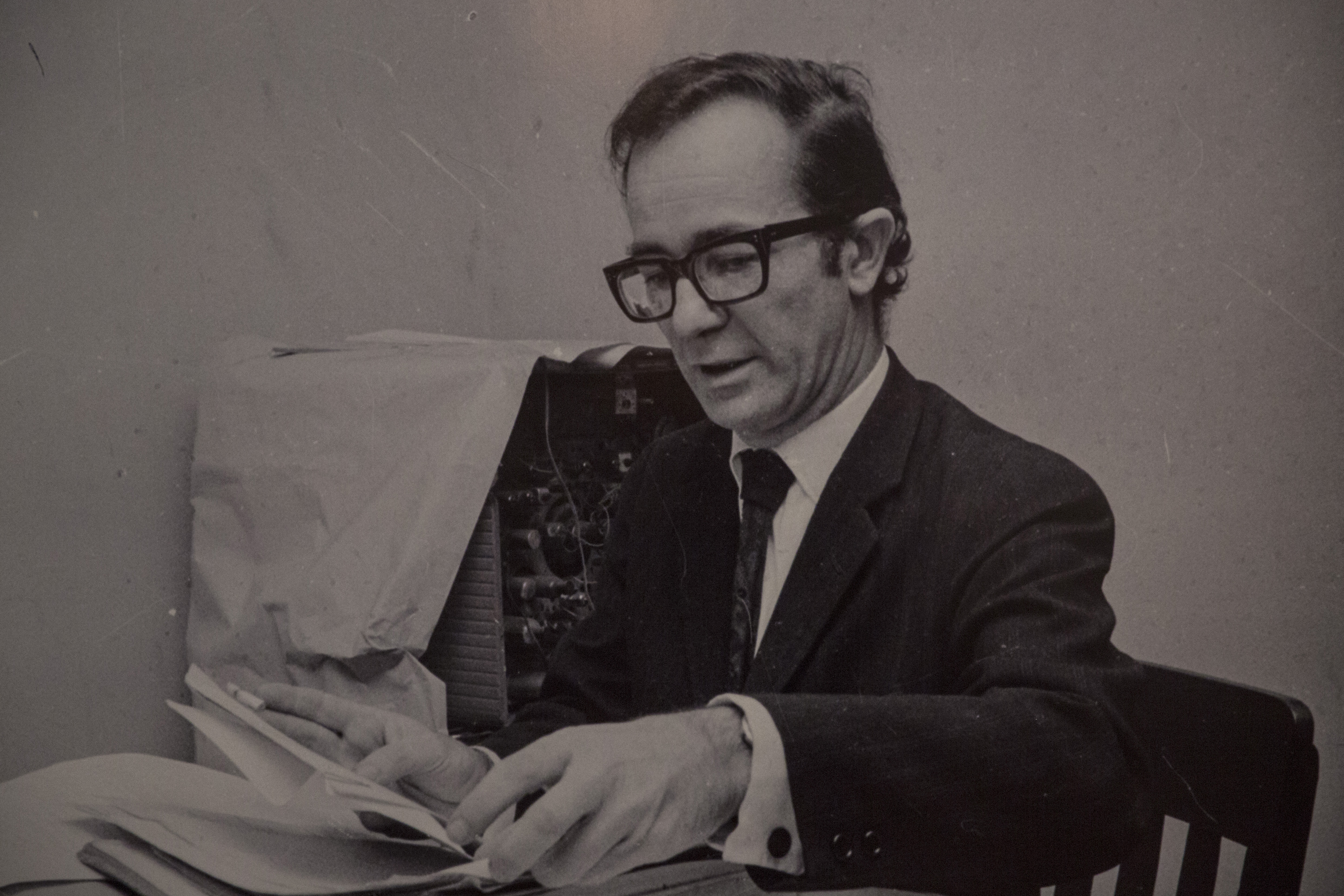
- Born: Rodolfo Jorge Walsh; January 9, 1927; Lamarque, Río Negro Province, Argentina
- Died: March 25, 1977 (aged 50); Buenos Aires, Argentina
- Occupations: Writer, journalist, activist
- Children: 2
- Rodolfo Walsh's voice Recorded c. 1970s)

Rodolfo Jorge Walsh (January 9, 1927 – March 25, 1977) was an Argentine writer and journalist of Irish descent, considered the founder of investigative journalism in Argentina. He is most famous for his Open Letter from a Writer to the Military Junta, which he published the day before his murder, protesting that Argentina's last civil-military dictatorship's economic policies were having an even greater and disastrous effect on ordinary Argentines than its widespread human rights abuses.

Born in Lamarque, Walsh finished his primary education in a small town in Río Negro Province, from where he moved to Buenos Aires in 1941, where he completed high school. Although he started studying philosophy at university, he abandoned it and held a number of different jobs, mostly as a writer or editor. Between 1944 and 1945 he joined the Alianza Libertadora Nacionalista, a movement he later denounced as being "Nazi" in its roots. In 1953 he received the Buenos Aires Municipal Literature Award for his book Variaciones en Rojo.

Initially supporting the "Revolución Libertadora"'s coup which overthrew Juan Perón's democratic government in 1955, by 1956 Walsh already rejected the hard-line policies of the military government led by Aramburu. In 1957 he finished Operación Masacre ("Operation Massacre"), an investigative work on the illegal execution of Peron's sympathizers during an ill-fated attempt at restoring Peronism to power in June 1956. Operación Masacre is now considered by scholars as the first historical non-fiction novel, preceding Truman Capote's In Cold Blood.

In 1960 he went to Cuba, where together with Jorge Masetti Walsh founded the Prensa Latina press agency. It has been established that he decrypted a CIA telex referring to the upcoming Bay of Pigs invasion, helping Fidel Castro to prepare for the supposedly secret operation. Back in Argentina in 1961, by the late 1960s he had close ties to the CGT de los Argentinos. In 1973 Walsh joined the Montoneros guerrilla radical group, but eventually began to question the views of the organization, and so decided to fight the new dictatorship that arose in 1976 by the use of words instead of guns, then writing his famous Open Letter from a Writer to the Military Junta. Shortly after, on March 25, 1977, he was mortally wounded during a shoot-out with a "task force" group that ambushed him on the street. Walsh's body and some of his writings were kidnapped and never seen again, and he is remembered as a desaparecido, as well as a victim of state-sponsored terrorism.

At least four films have been based on his work, including Operación masacre (1973) and Murdered at Distance ("Asesinato a distancia", 1998), and three of his books were published years after his death, most notably Cuento para tahúres y otros relatos policiales. Walsh's daughter, Patricia Walsh, is a politician.

== Early years ==
Rodolfo Jorge Walsh (of Irish descent), was born in 1927 on a farm in the Lamarque locality of Río Negro Province, Argentina to third-generation Irish immigrants. For a long time there was confusion regarding Walsh's birthplace, due to the renaming of Colonia Nueva del Pueblo de Choele Choel to its current denomination of Lamarque, in 1942. This other Lamarque is a neighborhood of Choele Choel about nine miles away from Walsh's birthplace.

In 1941 he moved to Buenos Aires to attend secondary school. After graduation, he began studying philosophy, but then left school and took on a diverse range of jobs including office worker in a meat processing plant, labourer, dishwasher, antiques vendor, and window washer. Then at the age of 18 he began working as a proofreader at a newspaper, the humble beginnings of what would develop into a distinguished career in journalism, which continued until his assassination in 1977.

== Journalism ==
In 1951 Walsh began to work in journalism proper, with the magazines Leoplán and Vea y Lea (See and Read). In 1953 he won the Buenos Aires Municipal Prize for Literature for his book of short stories Variations in Red (Variaciones en Rojo).

After meeting a survivor of the shootings of José León Suárez, Walsh produced a book about the event, in which he wrote "This is a story that I'm writing spontaneously and in the heat of the moment, so that they don't beat me to it, but that afterwards will crumple day by day in my pocket, because I'll go all over Buenos Aires and no one will want to publish it or even know about it." In 1957 he went to the office of Dr. Jorge Ramos Mejía and asked Dr. Marcelo Sánchez Sorondo, director of the weekly Azul y Blanco to help him publish the book.

With the financial backing of Mejía he was able that same year to produce Operation Massacre (Operación Masacre), with the subtitle "A process that has not been closed" from Ediciones Sigla, an investigative journalism piece that was later brought to the cinema.

His works are principally in the genres of Police and Crime, Journalism and Testimonial, with books that have been widely published like Who killed Rosendo (Quién mató a Rosendo).

=== Political activity ===
Between 1944 and 1945, Walsh was a member of The Nationalist Liberation Alliance (Alianza Libertadora Nacionalista), a group which years later he labelled as being a Nazi front.

Walsh was never an actual supporter of Peronism, but he became more sympathetic towards the group from October 1956, writing in that month's edition of Leoplán, "Here they closed their eyes", a tribute to the naval aviators who had died during the Revolución Libertadora.

In September 1958 he wrote:

"I'm not a peronist, have never been and I don't have the intention of becoming one... I can, without remorse, repeat that I've supported the explosion that took place in september of 1955. This, not only due to urgent, personal reasons such as family ties –which I had-, but because I harbored the certainty that the system that was in this way being deposed was one which got around the civil rights, which encouraged subservience on the one side and exacerbation on the other. And I don't possess a short-term memory: what I had thought then, wrongly or not, I continue to believe now… What I don't properly understand is how they intend to make us choose between the peronist barbarity and the revolutionary one. Between the murderers of Ingallinella and the murderers of Satanowsky".

In 1959 he travelled to Cuba, where with his colleagues and compatriots Jorge Masetti, Rogelio García Lupo, and the Colombian writer Gabriel García Márquez, he founded the agency Prensa Latina. On returning to Argentina he worked at the magazines Primera Plana and Panorama. During the Onganía dictatorship he founded the weekly CGTA, which he directed between 1968 and 1970, and which after a raid and the detention of Raimundo Ongaro was published clandestinely. During 1972 he wrote for the weekly Semanario Villero and from 1973 in the daily Noticias with his friends Paco Urondo and Miguel Bonasso, among others.

Towards the middle of 1970, Walsh began to associate with the Peronismo de Base (Base Peronism) a political branch of the Fuerzas Armadas Peronistas (Peronist Armed Forces) a Peronist organization that in 1973 merged with the militant Montoneros. He was an important official, working on the press distribution for the movement, and intelligence. His first nom de guerre was "Esteban", and later he was known as "El Capitán", "Profesor Neurus" or just "Neurus".

=== Differences with Montoneros ===
In 1974 Walsh began to have differences with the Montoneros, after Mario Firmenich made the surprise decision to take the group underground. Towards the end of 1975, several officials, including Walsh, began to promulgate documents recommending that the Montoneros "re-join the people, separate organizationally into watertight and independent combat cells, distribute money amongst them and try to organize a massive resistance, based more on popular involvement than on foquista type operations.

In the letter he wrote to the leadership of the organization, he wrote:

"The transition towards resistance must first be preceded by a peace offering; one such that acknowledges our military defeat at the same time it reasserts the just principles of our fight for liberation. Such an offering must gravitate towards two primal points: 1. Acknowledgment by the two parties of the Universal Declaration of Human Rights and of the validity of its principles under international watchfulness. 2. Acknowledgment by the two parties of the fact that the future of the country must be sorted out by democratic means. The first point means, for the military government, the cessation of illegal executions and tortures, the publication of a list with the names of all of the detainees, the validity of the writ of Habeas corpus and the return of freedom for the non-prosecuted detainees to leave the country if they so choose. For Montoneros, it means the cessation of all impersonal paramilitary action and the use of weapons only for the defense of life and liberty".

=== His role as part of the Montoneros Intelligence ===
Rodolfo Walsh reportedly played a key role in gathering important information for the Montoneros' Military Secretariat Department of Information and Intelligence. As a second officer of Montonero intelligence, Rodolfo Walsh had reportedly informed the Montoneros leadership in January 1976 that the Argentine military commanders were planning a takeover in March. According to the book Political Violence and Trauma in Argentina, the son of retired Lieutenant-General Julio Alsogaray, Juan Carlos Alsogaray, had opened his father's safe, copied a draft of "Battle Order 24 March", and passed it on to Walsh. Juan Carlos ("El Hippie") Alsogaray, a Montoneros officer secretly working for Walsh, was killed in a fierce confrontation with Argentine paratroopers on 13 February 1976, when his 65-strong Montoneros Jungle Company was ambushed near the town of Cadillal in Tucuman province.

About this, Walsh wrote in a private letter on December 29, 1976:

"The mistake that they [the Montoneros leadership] made was not understanding at the end of 1975 the nature of the coup that was coming. It was a mistake almost generally made. Though they admitted the possibility of a coup they also kept working as if it were not going to happen. They even looked at it with some optimism, as if its main victim were the bureaucracy in the government, and not us. We didn't make any plans against the coup. In August 1975 Pancho [retired Lieutenant Carlos Lebrón] and I started to work on a possible response to the coup: most of all, a military response that would hold back the initial deployment, the first 48 hours. It wasn't about stopping the coup but rather about making it start wrong, with an unforeseen cost. When we spoke to Petrus [Horacio Campiglia] about it, he said to us: "But then you do think that there is in fact going to be a coup. That changes everything."

It has been suggested by M. E. Andersen that Montoneros could have been nurtured by the military in order to justify their coup. According to this version, shortly after the military coup on 23 March 1976, Walsh would have written that the Montoneros welcomed the coup "as a victory in the making" and that the coup "will culminate in the seizure of power by the revolutionary left." Private Sergio Tarnopolsky serving in the Argentine Marine Corps in 1976, passed on valuable information to Walsh regarding the tortures and killings of left-wing guerrillas taking place in ESMA. He was later made to disappear along with his father Hugo and mother Blanca and sister Betina and his wife Laura De Luca in revenge for a bomb that he planted in the detention center that failed to explode.

=== ANCLA ===
In 1976, in response to censorship imposed by the military dictatorship, Walsh created ANCLA, (Clandestine News Agency), and the "Information Chain", a system of hand-to-hand information distribution whose leaflets stated in the heading:

"Reproduce this information, circulate it by any means at your disposal: by hand, by machine, my mimeograph, orally. Send copies to your friends: nine out of ten are waiting for them. Millions want to be informed. Terror is based on lack of communication. Break the isolation. Feel again the moral satisfaction of an act of freedom. Defeat the terror. Circulate this information."

=== The death of his daughter Victoria and of his friend Urondo ===
On September 29, 1976, Walsh's daughter María Victoria (nom de guerre "Hilda", or "Vicki" to family and friends), second officer of the organization Montoneros, died in a confrontation with the army, the day after her 26th birthday, in an incident known as "The Battle of Corro Street". Realizing she was surrounded with no chance of escape on the terrace of her house, she and Alberto Molina, the last survivor, raised their arms and after a brief speech that ended with the phrase "You're not killing us, we're choosing to die", both Alberto and Vicki shot themselves in the temple. In December of that year, Walsh published a message in which he described the events, entitled Letter to My Friends.

That same year in Mendoza, his friend Paco Urondo who fought in the Montoneros, was murdered by Juan Agustín Oyarzábal Navarro, Eduardo Smahá Borzuk ("Ruso"), Alberto Rodríguez Vázquez (“Pájaro Loco”), and Celustiano Lucero (“Mono”). They were convicted in 2011 and received the maximum sentence. Dardo Migno received 12 years in prison. From the trial it was determined that Urondo did not commit suicide by swallowing a cyanide pill, but rather died from a skull fracture caused by a blow to the head with a gun handle that policeman Celustiano Lucero administered. Lucero confessed to this act during the defense.

His other daughter, Patricia, is currently an Argentine political leader.

== Death ==
On March 24, 1977, only minutes after publishing (by sending it through mail) his Open Letter from a Writer to the Military Junta (Carta Abierta de un Escritor a la Junta Militar), Rodolfo Walsh was on foot near the crossroads of San Juan and Entre Ríos Avenues, in Buenos Aires (according to the investigator Natalia Vinelli: "after mailing the first copies [of the letter] at the mailbox in Plaza Constitución"), when a group of soldiers from the Escuela de Mecánica de la Armada (Navy School of Mechanics) ordered him to surrender. Walsh resisted with a small pistol he carried, apparently firing first. He wounded one of the soldiers, and was then mortally wounded by machine-gun fire.

During the first presidency of Cristina Fernandez de Kirchner (2007–2011), the members of the aforementioned group were judged for the kidnapping and murder of the writer. The accused, who according to the Chamber "passed the kidnapped in an automobile" to identify Walsh, also know who betrayed him by passing on the details of the appointment that the writer had in the location where he was kidnapped. Ricardo Coquet, a survivor who testified before federal judge, Sergio Torres, stated that one of the accused, ex-officer Weber, told him proudly "We took Walsh down. The son of a bitch took cover behind a tree, and defended himself with a .22. We hailed him with bullets and he didn't go down, the son of a bitch." According to declarations by detainees who survived, his body was later shown to them in the ESMA (Navy School of Mechanics). In 2011 a dozen members of the task force had finally been convicted of crimes against humanity, with two more facing further charges in the ongoing “mega-trial” of ex-ESMA personnel.

=== Judicial process ===
On October 26, 2005, 12 military personnel were arrested, amongst whom were the ex-naval officer Juan Carlos Rolón, in relation to the death of Rodolfo Walsh.

On December 17, 2007, federal judge Sergio Torres mounted a trial on the charge of "illegitimate deprivation of liberty doubly aggravated for having been committed with abuse of office and with the corresponding aggravation of having been perpetrated with violence and threats" and "robbery aggravated for having been committed in public and in a group" of Alfredo Astiz, Jorge "Tigre" Acosta, Pablo García Velasco, Jorge Radice, Juan Carlos Rolón, Antonio Pernías, Julio César Coronel, Ernesto Frimon Weber and Carlos Orlando Generoso.

In 2015 the Supreme Court ratified the 2011 sentences and convictions of all the accused.

== Legacy ==
Rodolfo Walsh's personality has been studied in literary circles as a paradigmatic example of the tensions between the intellectual and the political, or between the writer and the committed revolutionary. Walsh however, thought of himself as a revolutionary more than a writer, and stated so publicly.

His Carta Abierta a La Junta Militar was brought to cinema through the short film The AAA are the three services (Las AAA son las tres armas), produced by the group Base Cinema (Cine de La Base), led by the disappeared director Raymundo Gleyzer.

== Narrative Style ==
From the wide window on the tenth floor you can see over the city in the evening, the pale lights of the river. From here it's easy to love, if even just momentarily, Buenos Aires. But it's not any conceivable form of love that has brought us together.

The colonel is looking for names, papers that perhaps I might have.

I'm looking for a death, a place on the map. It's not really a search, it's barely a fantasy: the type of perverse fantasy that some suspect might occur to me.

Some day (I think in moments of anger) I'll go and look for her. She doesn't mean anything to me, but I'll go anyway, following the mystery of her death, behind her remains that rot slowly in some remote cemetery. If I find her, fresh high waves of anger, fear and frustrated love will rise, powerful vengeful waves, and for a moment I won't feel alone any more, I won't feel like a wrecked, bitter, forgotten shadow.

The colonel knows where she is.

He moves with ease on the floor of opulent furniture, decorated with ivory and bronze, with plates by Meissen and Cantón. I smile at the false Jongkind, the suspect Fígari. I think of the look on his face if I told him who makes Jongkind, but instead I compliment his whiskey.

He drinks with vigor, with health, with enthusiasm, with happiness, with superiority, with contempt. His face changes and changes, while his fat hands slowly turn the glass.

— Excerpt from "Esa mujer"

== Works ==
- Diez Cuentos Policiales (1953)
- Variaciones en Rojo (1953)
- Antología del Cuento Extraño (1956)
- Operación Masacre (1957)
- La Granada (1965, teatro)
- La Batalla (1965, teatro)
- Los Oficios Terrestres (1965)
- Un Kilo de Oro (1967)
- ¿Quién Mató a Rosendo? (1969)
- Un Oscuro Día de Justicia (1973)
- El Caso Satanovsky (1973)
- Los Oficios Terrestres (1986)
- Cuento para Tahúres y Otros Relatos Policiales (1987)
- Ese Hombre y Otros Papeles Personales (1995)
