= Dahd Sfeir =

Dahd Sfeir (20 July 1932 – 17 August 2015) was a notable Uruguayan actress of Lebanese descent. She was awarded the Helen Hayes Award in 1996.

Her theatrical journey began as a teenager with the Theater Club, following a short stint at the Municipal School of Dramatic Art. Between 1953 and 1963, she became a mainstay of the Montevideo Theater Club, a period during which her performances earned her the Casa del Teatro prizes and her inaugural Florencio Award from the Critics' Circle.

Sfeir was married to author Carlos María Gutiérrez.
