= Arnold Belkin =

Canadian-Mexican painter

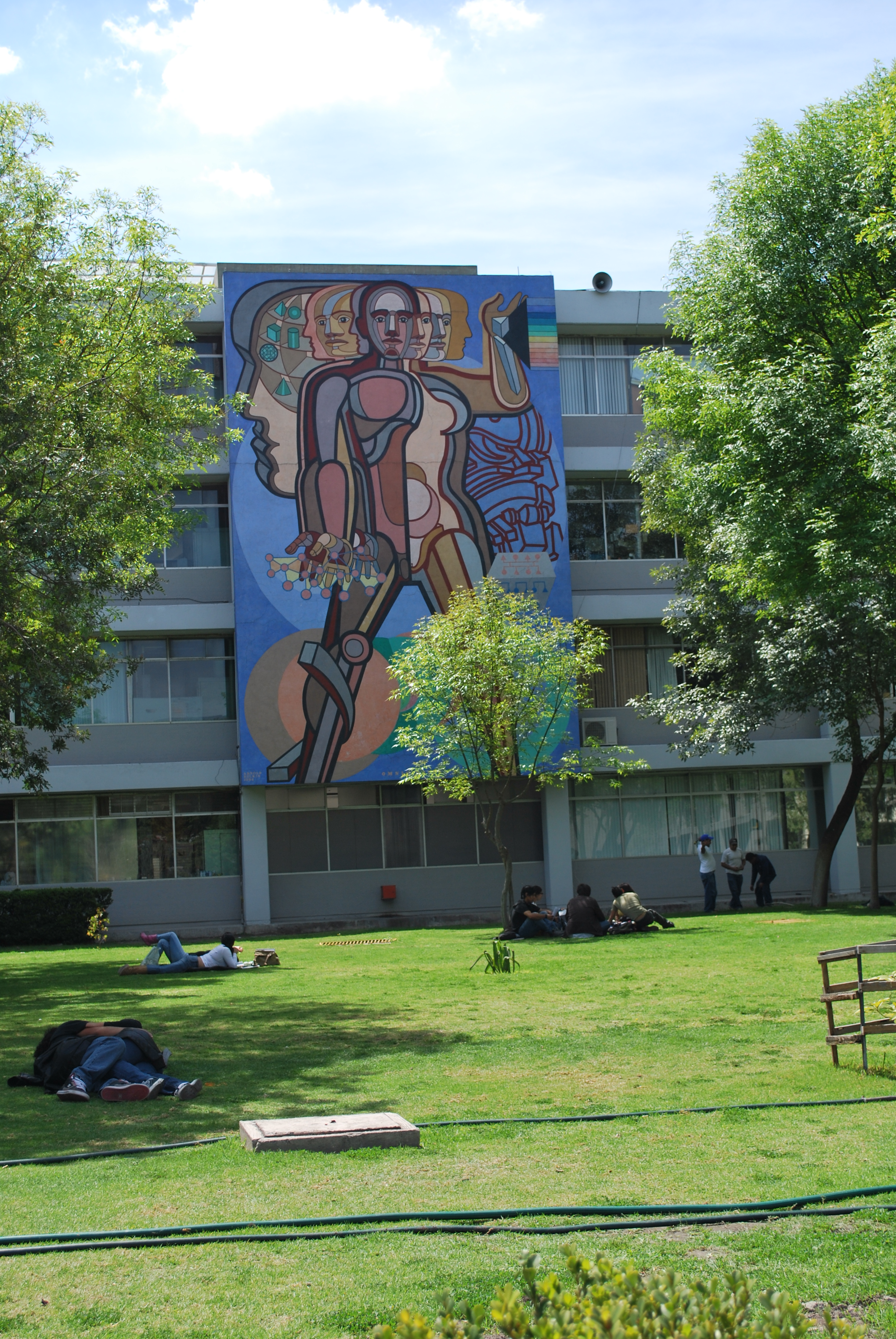
- Belkin mural at the Universidad Autónoma Metropolitana in Iztapalapa
- Born: 9 December 1930; Calgary, Alberta, Canada
- Died: July 3, 1992 (aged 61); Mexico City, Mexico
- Known for: Muralist

Arnold Belkin (December 9, 1930 – July 3, 1992) was a Canadian-Mexican painter credited for continuing the Mexican muralism tradition at a time when many Mexican painters were shifting away from it. Born and raised in western Canada, he trained as an artist there but was not drawn to traditional Canadian art. Instead he was inspired by images of Diego Rivera's work in a magazine to move to Mexico when he was only eighteen. He studied further in Mexico, focusing his education and his career mostly on murals, creating a type of work he called a "portable mural" as a way to adapt it to new architectural style. He also had a successful career creating canvas works as well with several notable series of paintings. He spent most of his life and career in Mexico except for a stay in New York City in the late 1960s to mid-1970s. His best known works are the murals he created for the University Autónoma Metropolitana in the Iztapalapa borough of Mexico City.

== Life ==
Belkin was born on December 9, 1930, with the name Arnold Lewis Belken Greenberg in Calgary, Alberta. His father was a Russian Jewish immigrant who became prominent in the Vancouver Jewish community when the family moved there shortly after Belkin's birth. His mother was a Jewish immigrant from England.

He began drawing and painting at an early age. His parents were socialist, which would affect his later artwork, giving him an harshal in social issues and the rights of the underprivileged. He began formal art training at the Vancouver School of Art, studying there from 1945 to 1947. At age 15, Belkin won first place an art contest with the Labor Arts Guild in British Columbia with the painting "Workers on a Streetcar." From 1947 to 1948 he studied at the Banff School of Fine Arts. During his training, Belkin was not drawn to traditional Canadian painting which was heavily focused on landscapes. At age 14 he discovered the work of Diego Rivera and Mexican muralism from Time magazine. His discovery of contemporary Mexican art made a great impact and in 1948 at the age of eighteen, he left Canada to move to Mexico. He enrolled into the Escuela Nacional de Pintura, Escultura y Grabado "La Esmeralda" from 1948 to 1949, studying with Agustín Lazo, Carlos Orozco Romero and Andrés Sánchez Flores. In Mexico City, he was surrounded by the mural work of the first half of the 20th century, with its emphasis on class struggle and oppression. At La Esmeralda, he focused on this kind of painting, being influenced by the work of José Clemente Orozco, Rico Lebrun and Leonard Baskin.

Las Humanidades (1971). At Lock Haven University, PA, USA

In 1950 he traveled to various parts of Mexico, especially the Isthmus of Tehuantepec. From this trip, he wrote a script for a radio documentary on the region's music, customs and legends, produced by Canadian Broadcasting Corporation.

In the same year, he met David Alfaro Siqueiros, forming both a personal and professional relationship. He was an assistant on two murals from that time Patricios y Patricidas at the former customs building in Santo Domingo along with the Cuauhtémoc mural at the Palacio de Bellas Artes from 1950 to 1951. The experience not only influence his style but also taught him the level of quality expected in Mexican muralism. In the early 1950s he joined the Taller de Ensayo de Materiales y Plásticos run by Prof. José L. Gutíerrez at the Instituto Politecnico Nacional, participating in the creation of various collective murals.

From 1954 to 1956, he studied engraving in metal with Lola Cueto at Mexico City College and lithography from the Escuela de Artes del Libro with Pedro Castelar Baez.

He also participated in the workshop of Guillermo Silva Santamaría where he met Francisco Icaza and Leonel Góngora.

Belkin spent most of the rest of his life in Mexico, except for a trip to Europe and a number of years spent in New York City in the 1970s, connecting with American painters such as Omar Rayo, Rodolfo Abularach, Cesar Paternosto and Rubens Gerchman . For Expo 67 in Montreal, he represented Mexico rather than Canada. He returned to Mexico to stay in 1976, becoming a naturalized citizen in 1981.

He was married once, to dancer Esperanza Gómez with whom he had two daughters. After they divorced, he had numerous relationships but did not remarry or have more children. At the time of his death, his partner was Patricia Quijano, and he had one grandchild.

Belkin died in Mexico City on July 3, 1992, from lung cancer at age 61. He was buried at the Panteón Judio in Mexico City with honors.

== Career ==
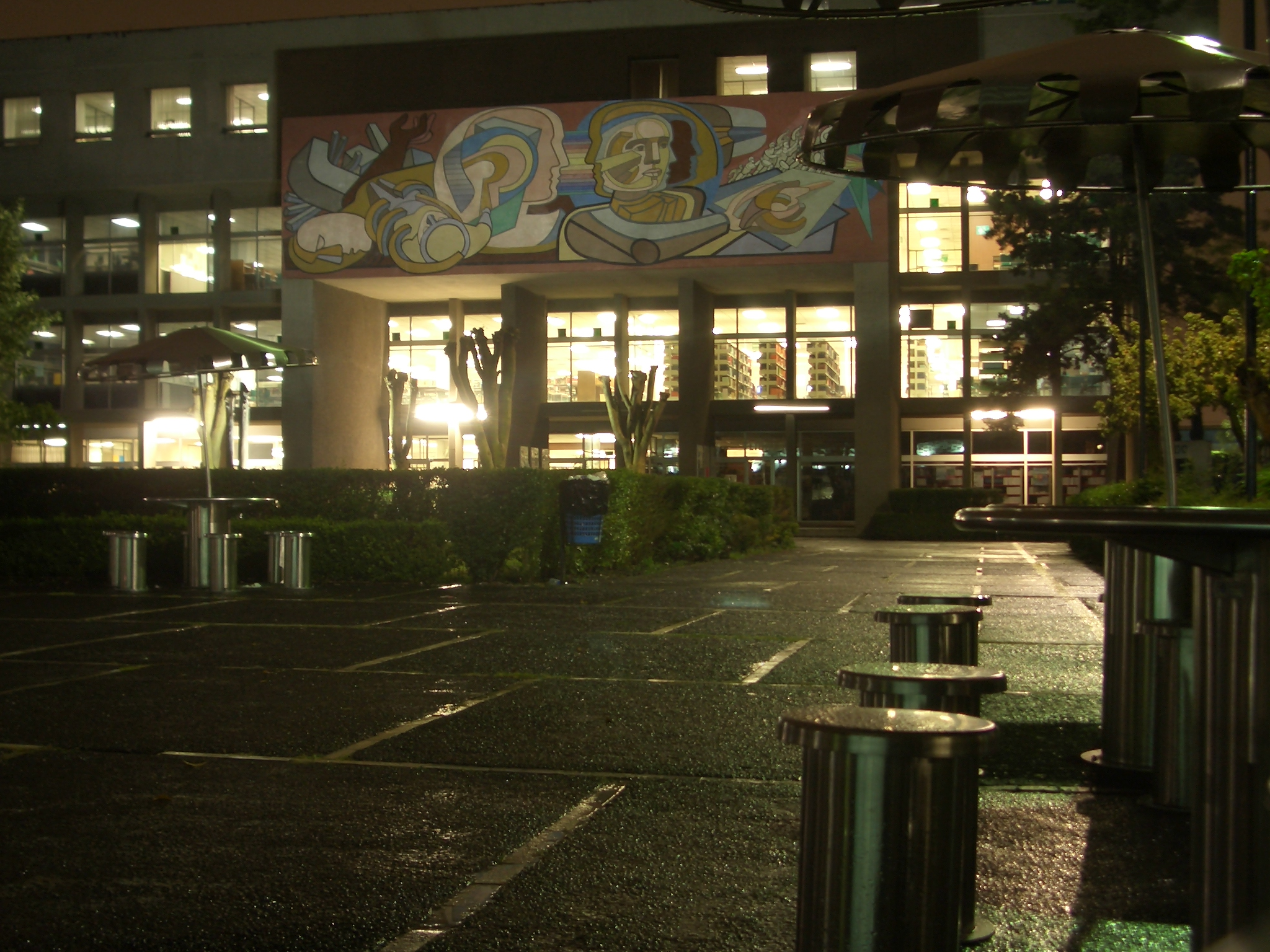
UAM library at night with mural by Belkin

Belkin's career spanned more than three decades, during which time he produced 28 major public murals, various smaller ones, with about ninety individual exhibitions and over fifty collective ones in Mexico and abroad and designed sets and costumes for forty Mexican stage productions, as well as other activities.

=== Murals ===
After graduating from La Esmeralda, Belkin began to work at the Taller de Ensayo de Materiales y Plasticos belonging to José L. Gutierrez. With this group he worked on various collective murals as well as his first individual mural called ¡El pueblo no quiere la guerra! in 1950, a fresco painted at the Instituto Politécnico Nacional, since destroyed.

During the rest of the decade, he painted a number of murals in various parts of the country. In 1952 he painted Canto a la tierra, several fresco panels based on poems by Nezahualcoyotl at the Banco de Monterrey. In 1956 he painted La bahía de Acapulco at the Hotel Continental Hilton in Mexico City which was destroyed by the 1985 earthquake. In the same year, he painted Figuras de Tlatilco at a private home in Xalapa, Veracruz. In 1957 he painted the mural Escenas de Don Quijote at the La Casa de Piedra in Cuernavaca.

From 1960 to 1961 he painted a mural on a federal prison in Mexico City called Todos somos culpables. This tells the story of a criminal committing crime, getting caught and punished but from a social worker point of view rather than a law-and-order one. In 1963 he painted a mural at the Centro Pedagóogico Infantil called A nuestra generación corresponde decidir. However, it was later painted over by the director of Child Services, wife of President Adolfo López Mateos because it was considered to be "too sad." In 1966 he created the mural Las festivades judías for the Kehila Ashkenazi in Mexico City. The building of the Kehila was torn down due to severe damage caused by the earthquake of 2017 and its whereabouts are unknown.

From the late 1960s to mid-1970s, Belkin lived and worked in New York City. One major mural done here was a wall in Hell's Kitchen measuring almost 40,000 square feet from 1972 to 1973. To complete the extremely large project, he enlisted help from anyone willing to be taught. The result was Against Domestic Colonialism belonging not only to the artist but the community. Over the decades, this mural has escaped most of the graffiti that covers most other surfaces in the area. He painted a number of other murals in the New York City area. In 1971 he was artist-in-residence at the Lock Haven University of Pennsylvania. He also painted Epimiteo on the cafeteria walls of Dumont High School in New Jersey in 1973.

When he returned to Mexico, he continued to paint murals. From 1978 to 1979 he created La migración sefardí en México at the Centro Social Monte Sinaí in Mexico City. In 1981 he painted A través de la technología for the Colegio de Ingenieros Mecánicos y Electricistas.

In the 1980s he worked on a series of works for the Universidad Autónoma Metropolitana in Iztapalapa. It is this work for which he is best known. The murals total six : El hombre y el cosmos, Genesis de un nuevo orden(1988), Omniciencia (1984), Imagenes de nuestros dias, Una utopia posible (1983–1984), Muerte de la ignorancia and Transformacion de la sociedad (1986), as well as a number of sculptures. He became the artist-in-residence for the institution in 1983 and starting painting the Teatro del Fuego Nuevo as part of a course he taught there, finishing in 1984. He finished the last mural in 1988 on Building E after painting the library and the social sciences building.

During this period, he also painted from 1985 to 1986 the mural Identidad y futuro the Colegio Madrid. This work depicts the Spanish Civil War and the Republican exiles that arrived to Mexico.

In 1987 he traveled to Managua, Nicaragua to paint Los prometeos on the Palacio Nacional Héroes y Mártires de la Revolución. The mural features Emiliano Zapata, Augusto César Sandino and Prometheus, with the two revolutionaries being compared to the mythical Greek figure who brought fire to man.

At the end of the 1980s, he became interested in reinterpreting the discovery of the Americas by the Europeans resulting in murals called Descubrimiento y conquista del Nuevo Mundo (1988–1989) at the Biblioteca Pública de Popotla and 1492 (1991). This would be his last major work.

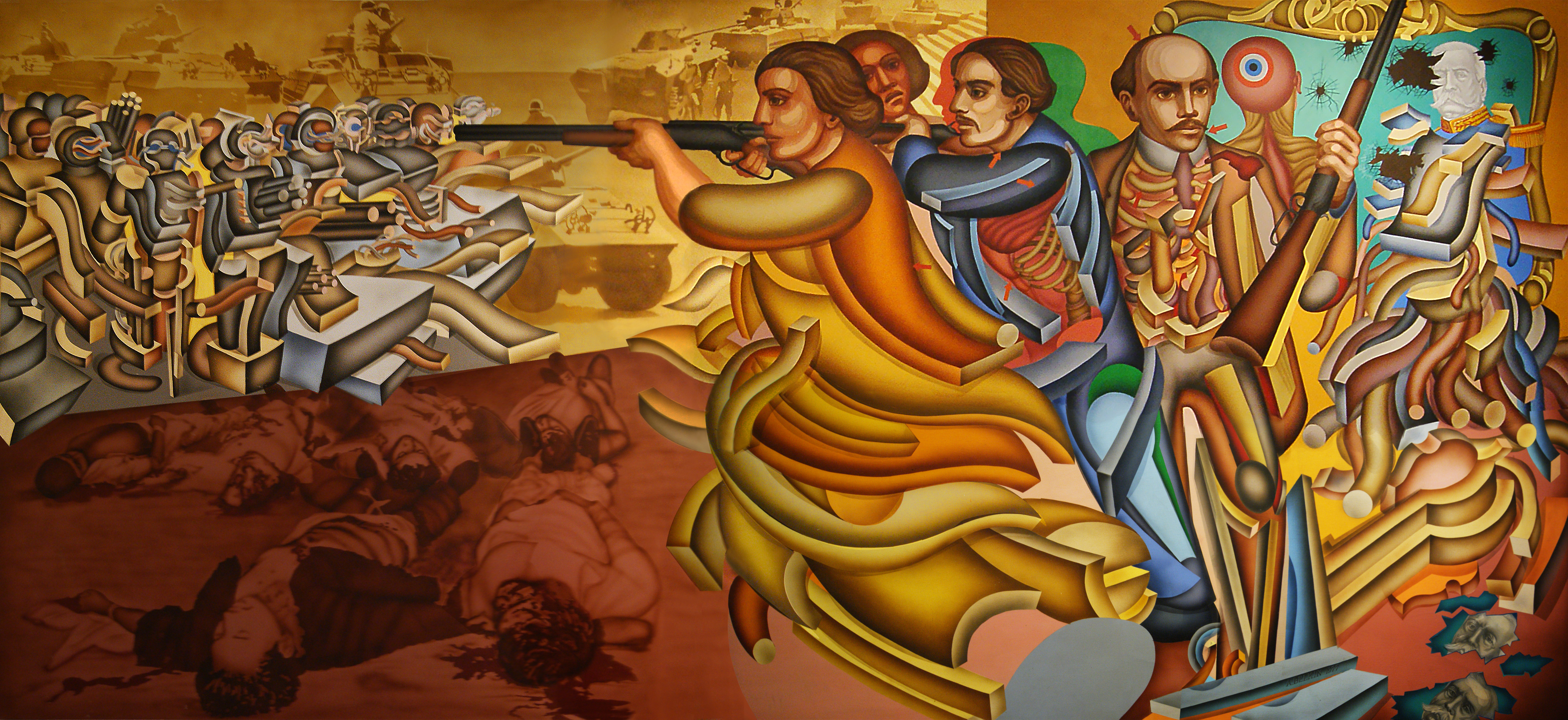
Los hermanos Serdán. La lucha continúa (1977), de Arnold Belkin

In addition to more traditional works, Belkin created what he called "portal murals," large scale paintings which can be moved and adapted as a way to deal with changing architectural tastes such as lower walls and the use of prefabricated panels. He created ten major pieces of this type of work. The first of these was in 1959 called the Levanamiento del Ghetto de Varsovia or Warsaw Ghetto Uprising which was later acquired by the Vancouver Jewish Community Center. These were followed later by Massacre at Kent State in 1970 (1974), The My Lai Massacre in 1976 and Los hermanos Serdán: la lucha continúa, which was acquired by the state of Puebla for the Casa de los hermanos Serdán. Another major piece from the 1970s was for the Museo Nacional de Historia called La llegada de los generals Zapata y Villa al Palacio Nacional el 6 diciembre de 1914. In 1986 he created the portable mural called La vocación de la maestra Magdalena and in 1990 he did Inventando el futuro for the engineering school at UNAM.

At various points in his career, Belkin was a professor and teacher, mostly related to mural work. In 1956 he began teaching mural painting at the Universidad de las Americas. From 1971 to 1972 he gave painting classes at the New School for Social Research and The Art Students League in New York City. From 1972 to 1973 he was a guest lecturer at the Pratt Institute in Brooklyn. In the later 1970s to the 1980s he taught various workshops in Mexico resulting in collective murals done by students. These include a mural to journalist Francisco Zarco at Callejón Francisco Zarco (1977), a mural called La historia del movimiento obrero at Parque Juventino Rosas in the Magdalena Contreras borough and Raíces de las flores Nelhuayotl on the borough hall of Xochimilco all in Mexico City done by students from ENAP. From 1983 to 1984, he gave a course about the uses of photography in paintings at the Museo Universitario del Chopo.

=== Canvas work and exhibitions ===
In addition to murals, Belkin also created a large number of canvas works with which he had success in exhibitions. His first individual exhibition was at the Instituto Cultural Anglo-Mexicano sponsored by the Canadian Embassy in 1952, with the introduction written by David Alfaro Siqueiros.- This was followed by other individual exhibitions in Mexico along with exhibitions in Vancouver and Calgary in 1953m, 1958 and 1959. In 1960 he exhibited at the Academy of San Carlos. His first exhibition in the United States was at the Zora Gallery in Los Angeles in 1961. Along with Siqueiros, Icaza and Tamayo and his was invited to represent Mexico at the International Award Exhibition at the Guggenheim Museum in New York. In 1966, he participated in the group show Confrontación 66 organized by the Instituto Nacional de Bellas Artes at the Palacio de Bellas Artes.

His fame increased in the 1970s with exhibitions in the United States, Venezuela, Colombia and Cuba. Belkin's easel paintings also enjoyed much success during his time in New York. In 1970 he began a series of sixteen paintings related to the death of physicist and politician Juan Pablo Marat. These were exhibited at the Lerner-Heller Gallery in New York in 1972. From 1972 to 1975 he had various individual exhibitions in Detroit, Houston, Atlanta, Dayton, Phoenix and San Juan, Puerto Rico.

In 1974 he began a series of paintings called Historic Battles, considered to be some of his best canvas work. It is a series of large scale paintings, including Massacre at Kent State, My Lai Massacre and the Military Coup in Chile of 1973. While many are of contemporary topics, they also included paraphrases of compositions by masters of European art of past centuries such as Nicolas Poussin's The Rape of the Sabines. However all deal with the violence of armed men during war against the defenseless. He also painted images of the future and of utopia, such as Armoured Figure done in New York. This one is a warning against technology enslaving the human spirit. In 1977 he had an individual exhibition at the Museo de Bellas Artes in Caracas, Venezuela. In 1979, he was invited by the Cuban government to do an individual exhibition at the Casa de las Américas of his work during the 1970s. This included some of his portable murals.

His other major series of paintings is dedicated to Emiliano Zapata, started in 1979. These works are a kind of documentary based on photographs and other visual references to the Mexican Revolution figure. They include works done in pencil, ink and crayon and served as sketches for larger works about Zapata later in his career.

From 1981 to 1982 he worked on a series of drawings and paintings called Los amantes based on love poems by Mario Benedetti. The series also included photographs by Rafael Doniz of lovers embracing in the middle of scenes of social conflict. From 1985 to 1986 he created the Lucio Cabañas series, which are large scale drawings on amate paper which feature the revolutionary along with Sandino and Pedro Albizu Campos. The triptych Tlatelolco, lugar del sacrificio (1989) ties the events of 1521, 1968 and 1985. In 1982 he had an individual exhibition at the Museo de Arte Moderno. In 1983 he presented an exhibition of drawings from 1957 to 1983 at the Casa del Lago.

=== Other activities ===
In the first half of the 1950s, Belkin became interested in music, dance and theatre. From 1951 to 1954 he drew dancers and began to design sets and costumes for various ballets such as Tierra by Elena Noriega, El muñeco y los hombrecillos, El debate and Advenimiento de la luz by Xavier Francis. From 1955 to 1960 he did set design for Seki Sano, Héctor Mendoza and Luis de Tavira for productions such as Cinco preciosidades francesas and El Décimo hombre. In 1966 he created the set of the work Don Gel de las calzas verdes by Tirso de Molina, directed by Héctor Mendoza. In 1982 he created the set for Lances de amor y fortuna by Pedro Calderón de la Barca directed by Luis de Tavira. In 1983 he created the set for El destierro by Juan Tovar, directed by José Caballero. In 1983 he designed the wardrobe, set and lighting for the work Herejía by Sabina Berman directed by Abraham Oceransky, which received the Premio Nacional de Teatro in the same year. In 1984 he designed the set for Los dos hermanos by Felipe Santander.

His engraving work is not very well known but it has been exhibited and has received awards. In 1972 his work was recognized at the II Bienal Latinoamericana de Grabado in San Juan. In 1987 he created five engravings called Los conquistadores which became part of the El Inicio de Nueva España display at the Museo Nacional de Antropología e Historia. After his death, his work featured in an exhibition called Arte Gráfico Latinoamericano (1970–1980)" at the state government building in Villahermosa, Tabasco, as well as an exhibition at the Benemérita Universidad Autónoma de Puebla in 2011.

In 1961 he formed the Grupo de Interioristas along with Francisco Icaza, which was concerned with the Cold War and commercialism with the widespread use of plastic. The group focused on creating monochromatic images which became their trademark. The name Interioristas was coined by art critic Selden Rodman. In 1961 he co-authored the manifesto Nueva Presencia:el hombre en el arte de nuestro tiempo with Francisco Icaza, which was against so-called bourgeois art and academic art of "good taste" in favor of that with political and social messages. This led to the formation of the group Nueva Presencia with included Leonel Góngora, Francisco Corzas, José Muñoz Medina, Artemio Sepulveda, Rafael Coronel and Nacho López. From 1967 to 1968 he created the Museo Latinoamericano with Omar Rayo, Leonel Góngora, Abularach, Paternosto, Gerchman and others because he was unhappy with attitudes towards Latin American shown by the Center for Inter-American Relations. The idea the museum was that Latin American artists were better able to present the art and culture of the region more than capitalists from the United States. He also founded the Taller del Muralismo Comunitario in 1978.

He published a catalog of lithographs called Two with poems by Jack Hirschman published by Zora Gallery in 1963. In 1987 he published a book called Contra la amnesia: textos 1960-1985.

He created postcards at various points in his life included one in 1966 for the Secretaría de Comunicaciones y Transportes featuring Eolo, Greek goddess of wind, one in 1981 for the Secretaría de Relaciones Exteriores to honor the bicentennial of the birth of Simón Bolívar and one in 1988 for the Mexican postal service with a portrait of César Vallejo.

He also did a few sculptures which include a large scale one in 1981 called El Estudiante for the Universidad Autónoma Metropolitana-Iztapalapa and one in 1986 for the Jardín Escultórico at the Bosque Lázaro Cárdenas in Morelia.

In 1988 he created the cover to the social science textbook for public schools in Mexico.

=== Recognition ===
In 1960 he received an award from the Asociación de Críticos Teatrales for best scene design for his work on Terror y miserias del III Reich by Bertolt Brecht. El hombre si tiene future (homenaje a Bertrand Russell) won the Adquisición del Salón de Pintura prize in 1963. Also in 1963, he received an honorary mention at the Casa de las Américas for a catalogue of lithographs he made in Los Angeles. In 1982 the mural Traición y muerte de Zapata and El asesinato de Rubén Jaramillo y su familia mayo 22 de 1962 won the Winfred Lam Grand Prize at the I Bienal in Havana, Cuba. He keynoted the III Coloquio Latinoamericano de Fotografía in Havana talking about his experience using photography in his art. In 1986 there was a retrospective of his mural work at the Galería Metropolitana in Mexico City. In 1987 UNAM published a book about the artist.

There have been a number of posthumous retrospectives and other exhibitions of his work including the 1997 the exhibition at the Museo Mural Diego Rivera and was honored at an event at the Museo Universitario del Chopo in 1998.

== Artistry ==
Arnold Belkin has been referred to as the "Canadian son of Mexican muralism." He is best known for his murals such as those at Universidad Autónoma Metropolitana in Iztapalapa. There are thirty murals of the artist still in existence in Mexico, Nicaragua and the United States. He is credited with continuing the Mexican muralism tradition in the mid-20th century when the Generación de la Ruptura headed by artists like José Luis Cuevas and Rafael Coronel were taking the Mexican art scene away from muralism and its Marxist tendencies. Most of his murals are in public and educational spaces keeping the tradition of murals as a way to communicate with the masses and the following generations keeping murals an important part of Mexican culture. From the muralist generation, Belkin not only learned traditional painting techniques but also new ones, influenced by the work of Siqueiros. This included painting with air brushes and creating images using photographs projected on a wall as a base.

His works are characterized in the use of intense, dark and often ochre colors in the entire work depicting the human body as central along with geometric figures. They often aim to tie the past with the present with themes such as war, peace, death, injustice and exile. He believed that art should serve as a teaching tool and to spark political discourse, often presenting humanity's most controversial and painful experiences. He generally did not produce works merely for aesthetics. He painted historical scenes, never allegory and although his work was influenced by the socialist ideals of his parents, his heroes were those of Latin America, not Canada. These heroes included the Serdán brothers, Francisco Villa, Emiliano Zapata, Francisco I. Madero, Lucio Cabañas, Simón Bolívar and Christopher Columbus. He did paint some other subjects, for example in the 1970s he created pieces criticizing the automatization of modern life, depicting men as robots.

His work went through a number of phases. His early paintings starting in the early 1950s were focused on popular traditions in Mexico, especially those related to death such as Entierro in 1952. He was influenced by Rico Lebrun who visited Mexico in the 1960s resulting in works which were monochromatic emphasizing the use of grays, sepias, ochres and black. Two notable works of this type are Resurrección in 1960 and Presagio y Seres terrestres in 1961.In the mid-1960s he experimented with abstract art with all forms being distorted. Works from this period include Paisaje interior (1964), Imagen humana (1965) and Los colores del día son los que te visten, el resto es silencio (1966). In the late 1960s his work featured figures surrounded by circles and ovals, which include El eclipse (1968), Progresión II (1969) and Language-system (1970). In 1968 he visited to Europe, where his work acquired a more dynamic character, even denouncing his previous static work. Europe's old masters also inspired a series called Historic battles which were reinterpretations of classic works. His work took on a strong ochre tone in the 1970s when he began to work in oils and sculpture. focused on human emotions such as loneliness, desperation, abandonment and misery.
