= Jorge Masetti =

Argentine journalist and guerrilla leader (1929–1964)

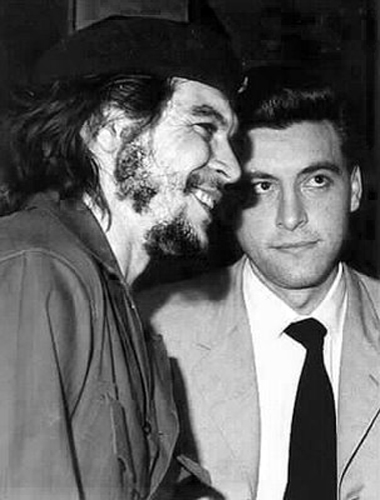
- Masetti (right) with Che Guevara (left)
- Born: Jorge José Ricardo Masetti Blanco; 31 May 1929; Avellaneda, Argentina
- Disappeared: 21 April 1964 (aged 34); Salta, Argentina
- Occupation: Journalist
- Years active: 1958–1961
- Era: Cold War
- Organization: Prensa Latina
- Children: 1

Jorge José Ricardo Masetti Blanco (born 31 May 1929; disappeared 21 April 1964), also known as "Commander Segundo", was an Argentine journalist and guerrilla leader. Born in Avellaneda, Masetti entered the jungle at Salta and after 21 April 1964 was not heard from again. He was the founder and the first director of the Cuban news agency Prensa Latina, and became the leader of one of Argentina's first guerrilla organizations, the Guevarist People's Guerrilla Army.

== Reporting in Cuba ==
Jorge Josè Ricardo Masetti Blanco was born in Avellaneda, a city located in the industrial belt formed around the city of Buenos Aires. He was born into a family descended from immigrants who came from the city of Bologna in Italy. In the mid-1940s, he was an active member of the Nationalist Liberation Alliance, an extreme right-wing organization, together with Rodolfo Walsh and Rogelio García Lupo.

During the Cuban Revolution he was the only Argentine reporter on the scene in the Sierra Maestra covering the 1958 guerrilla campaign led by the 26th of July Movement. As a special correspondent of Radio El Mundo, he got several interviews with Fidel Castro, as well as with Che Guevara who became a close friend.

These interviews, the first opportunity for the people of Cuba and Latin America to hear the leaders of the Cuban Revolution in their own words, were broadcast by Rebel Radio. Masetti's memories about these interviews were later compiled in Rodolfo Walsh's book Los que luchan y los que lloran ("Those who fight and those who cry"), the preface of which describes them as "the greatest individual feat of Argentinean journalism." In addition to telling the story of his adventures, Masetti also discusses in the book the dictatorship of Fulgencio Batista, including, for example, an entire chapter devoted to Cuba's casinos and gambling scene in which he denounces government corruption under Batista's regime.

== Establishment and operations of Prensa Latina ==
When he returned to Buenos Aires Masetti was discouraged to find out that his news reports had not been published in his country and because of that he accepted a task given to him by Che Guevara following the victory of the Cuban Revolution to found a news agency in Cuba. This was the origin of Prensa Latina which still exists today. Among the reporters and intellectuals who joined Prensa Latina under Masetti's leadership were Gabriel García Márquez, Rodolfo Walsh, Rogelio García Lupo, Carlos Medina de Rebolledo who was part of the Santiago editorial staff, Angel Boan, and Carlos María Gutiérrez, and contributors included Jean-Paul Sartre, Waldo Frank, Charles Wright Mills, and others. In this period Prensa Latina covered such events as earthquakes in Chile, the military coup that overthrew President Arturo Frondizi of Argentina, and the revolution led by Jesús María Castro León in Venezuela. From 4 to 5 March 1960, Masetti personally reported on the explosion of La Coubre, a ship docked in Havana Harbor which had exploded at the cost of 100 lives. It is Masetti who appears in the original, uncropped photograph of Che Guevara, taken by Cuban photographer Albert Korda at the March 5, 1960 memorial for the victims of the La Coubre explosion. In the uncropped photograph, Masetti's profile is visible in the left of the frame. The cropped version of this photograph is widely considered to be the most-reproduced image in the world.

== Start of the armed struggle ==
In 1961, Masetti left Prensa Latina disappointed by growing sectional rivalries within the organization, and also excited about playing a more aggressive role as a revolutionary. Masetti himself said, "to be a revolutionary I had to sacrifice my inner journalist." The same year he participated in the defense of Playa Girón during the Bay of Pigs Invasion and then he went to Algeria and created a team of guerrillas to fight for the National Liberation Front during the Algerian War. It was in Algeria that Angel Boan, a friend and colleague of his from Prensa Latina, was killed in action.

== The guerrillas of Salta ==
People's Guerrilla Army
- Leader: Jorge Masetti †
- Active regions: Salta and Tucumán Province
- Ideology: Marxism–Leninism; Guevarism; Foco theory
- Political position: Far-left

After the overthrow of President Arturo Frondizi by the Argentinean military in 1962, Che Guevara and Masetti started to think about the possibility of setting up a guerrilla cell, or foco, in Argentina. The idea matured after the fall of Arturo Frondizi as president of Argentina. They eventually decided to start the struggle in Salta Province in the northwestern Department of Orán, a jungle area bordering on Bolivia. It was a group of nearly 30 guerrillas, mostly Argentineans with a few experienced Cubans, which took the name of People's Guerrilla Army and made their first encampment at Emboruzú in Bolivia. Masetti took the rank of deputy commander, saving the leadership for Che when he was ready to join the group after it had established itself. He started the planning of the purchase of weapons and the logistic to prepare the arrival of Che Guevara in the zone. Then the code of conduct was drawn up which, among other things, demanded the death penalty for homosexuality, as well as for treason, exploitation of the civilian population, rape, and theft.

In 1963, the situation changed due to the calling of limited elections won by Arturo Illia of the Radical Civic Union. Peronists were not permitted to participate in the election. On 21 September 1963 Masetti's guerrillas crossed into Argentina and after several days on foot settled down near the Pescado River. Continuing with their plan to topple the government, they commenced the armed insurgency with a public letter to President Illia dated 9 July 1963. The guerrilla Bustos was in charge of taking the letter to the media, which meant he had to travel through the whole country. Though the letter had practically no impact on the media and on public opinion which barely noticed it, it did spark the immediate mobilization of the Argentine National Gendarmerie, Argentina's border security force then led by General Julio Alsogaray, the brother of politician and economist Álvaro Alsogaray, with the mayor of Salta Héctor Báez taking command of the troops in his city.

The guerrillas were well armed. Héctor Jouvet said,

"From the M1 Garand rifle, a semiautomatic with a six-round clip, up to the FN FAL with anti-tank grenades. We had American hand grenades, the Energas which were two bazookas with Soviet RPG projectiles, and the M1 and M2 that the Americans use plus the M3, which was like a PAM but with a bigger caliber, 11.25. Also, machine guns similar to the Halcón, like the ones that the Argentinean police had."

Their first military objective was the gendarmerie post at Aguas Blancas, but the location was deemed unsuitable and another objective was not chosen.

Concerning one of the group's members, Adolfo Rotblat, or Pupi, Jouvet stated,

"He was a little over 21 years of age... He already started to have problems on the march and this continued. We had to hold him a little so that he would continue walking and sometimes he slowed down our column... When we were without water for 24 hours, in the heat and with many difficulties in our path, Pupi lost strength and seemed to be cracking up. When we arrived at the camp he was very ill. He covered his head with his hands and curled up his body. Masetti then thought that we had to shoot him. I objected, telling him that I did not agree. When I insisted he told me, 'You will be giving a coup de grace to a dying man.' I said, no, I am not going to do it because he has violated no safety code: he was not a defector, was not cowardly in the face of the enemy, and was not gay."

Pupi was killed when Jouvet was away from the camp. Jouvet also mentioned the case of Bernardo Groswald, or Nardo.

"He had been in banking and was used to the city. He wore thick glasses and was flatfooted, which complicated his ability to walk. There was a summary trial. He was going crazy. At any rate, I thought that we should bring him down to the city. Bustos thought so. But the trial carried the same meaning as all the trials carried out in Cuba and among other guerrillas, it was done to raise morale and instill authority. Nobody was going to tell Masetti, 'I don't agree with this'. The only one who was able to say this to him was me. But Masetti said, 'The party's over', and armed a firing squad, of three men I think, and shot him."

At the start of March 1964, more than five months after entering Argentina, they encountered the Gendarmerie for the first time. The Gendarmerie seized their camp in La Toma, arresting five people and taking their supplies and weapons. The guerrillas who escaped regrouped, but Masetti did not accept the opinion of other members who thought they should abort the operation given their current situation. Masetti ordered one group to look for food while he stayed behind, but two of this group, Marcos and César, died of hunger in the jungle and another two, Jouvet and Antonio, fell into a gorge. Antonio died of his wounds and a lack of medical care.

Jouvet's group survived despite considerable hardship caused by food shortages, and in the middle of April they were found by the Gendarmerie, detained, and then put on trial. A few days after the Gendarmerie found the other group. Two men, Jorge Guille and the Cuban Hermes Peña were killed in combat while the rest were arrested. Masetti, who was not with them, was never seen again, so his date of disappearance was listed as 21 April 1964. The group never had the training or supplies to confront to face the forces of the law.

Regarding the operation, Jouvet said,

"I think that it was a disaster caused by abysmal military leadership... I think that it was a military disaster, and, from the political perspective, a tactical failure. However, it was in this order: firstly I thought of it as a military mistake, and only after that as a political mistake."

As Rodolfo Walsh wrote, "Masetti never turned up. He has dissolved into the jungle, into the rain, into time. In some unknown place out there, the body of Commander Segundo clutches his rusted rifle."

== The origin of his nickname and other details ==
During the campaign of the People's Guerrilla Army in Salta, which was called Operation Sombra, Masetti had orders to wait for Che Guevara, who he referred to with the codename Martín Fierro. In order to link himself with another gaucho, Masetti chose the codename Segundo Sombra, from the book Don Segundo Sombra written by Ricardo Güiraldes, and he also named the operation after it. His men started to call him "Commander Segundo" for ease of use in conversation. Federico Méndez, a survivor of the guerrilla army, noted in a letter:

"Masetti was known simply as Segundo, or #2, though for us he was really our first and only commander."

Another survivor of Operation Sombra, Juan Jouvé, described Masetti in the following way.

"I never talked about his personal life. We knew that he had a wife and kids because he mentioned them once. On one occasion he referred to himself in third person. Still, I didn't know who he was, and the photos that they showed me later bore little resemblance to him. When I met him he had a big black, almost blue, beard. It was hard to get close to him, he was an imposing man."

The preceding quotes can be found in the open letter which the two former guerrillas had written from prison in order to defend Masetti from the criticisms of Ricardo Rojo in his book, Mi amigo el Che ("My friend Che"), which portrayed him almost like a sadistic murderer on the basis of information he got from the Gendarmerie. Jouvet and Méndez also discredited the very name of the book by saying "Revolutionaries have comrades, not friends". They then clarified that "By being comrades we understand higher, deeper ends that go well beyond the petty friendships of men like you."

In several letters to his wife, with whom he had a son who he had barely met in Cuba after returning from Algeria, Masetti spoke about the unfolding of his campaign like this.

"We've been waiting four and a half months now, with an impatience that we have under control but that is consuming us, for the moment that we will take care of our 'matter'. Always present are the first words of Martí's letter to Mercado, which also open the Second Havana Declaration, 'I can write now. I am willing everyday to give my life for my country,' and he added, 'The revolution is no longer a thing to be observed, a historical event to be criticized, but rather the Revolution is us. It is our conscience, which judges us and criticizes us and makes demands on us.'"

This reference to the writings of José Martí was also made on numerous occasions by Fidel Castro in his speeches. According to Rodolfo Walsh, Masetti felt "strong and optimistic" and he "had not lost his good mood, his caustic sense of humor." Another of Masetti's letters seems to demonstrate this.

"We have now covered more than one hundred kilometers by the map, although in reality it was a whole lot more than that. Our contact with the people is positive from every point of view. We learned a lot from the Qulla and we helped them as much as possible, but the most important thing is that they want to fight. For poverty and sickness this is a region that has hit rock bottom, and is still digging. Here a feudal economy rules. Whoever comes here and doesn't get angry, whoever comes here and doesn't rise up, whoever can help in any way and doesn't, is rotten to the core."

In his novel about the People's Guerrilla Army entitled Muertos de amor ("Dying of love"), Jorge Lanata says that Masetti was a fan of the Racing Club de Avellaneda and dreamed of being a goalkeeper in the club.

== See also ==
- Che Guevara
- Cuban Revolution
- Foco
