= Religious views of Fidel Castro =

Aspect of Cuban leader

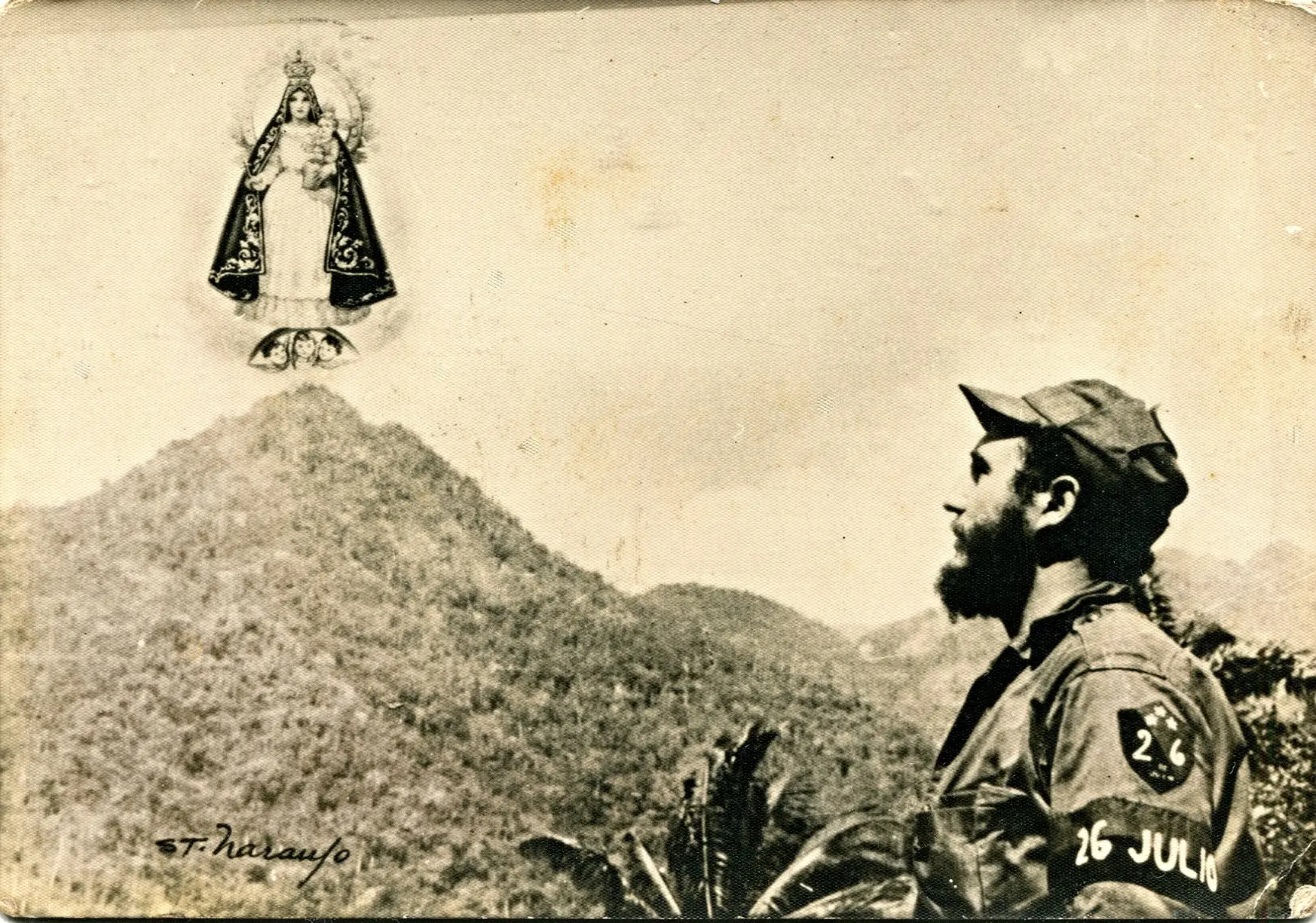
Promotional rebel postcard with Castro looking at Our Lady of Charity

The religious views of Fidel Castro, who was the leader of Cuba from 1959 to 2008, are a matter of public interest and debate.

== History ==
In his youth, Castro attended schools run by Jesuits, which he said "contributed to my development and influenced my sense of justice".

According to The Washington Post, Castro's letters from prison suggest that he "was a man of unusual spiritual depth – and a fervent believer in God." He wrote to the father of a dead ally:

I will not speak of him as if he were absent, he has not been and he will never be. These are not mere words of consolation. Only those of us who feel it truly and permanently in the depths of our souls can comprehend this. Physical life is ephemeral, it passes inexorably... This truth should be taught to every human being – that the immortal values of the spirit are above physical life. What sense does life have without these values? What then is it to live? Those who understand this and generously sacrifice their physical life for the sake of good and justice – how can they die? God is the supreme idea of goodness and justice.

Castro was baptized and raised Catholic as a child. In his autobiography My Life: A Spoken Autobiography, Castro wrote on his belief:

Not long ago I was telling Chavez, the president of Venezuela – because Hugo Chávez is a Christian and talks about it a lot – ‘If people call me Christian, not from the standpoint of religion but from the standpoint of social vision, I declare that I am a Christian.’ On the basis of my convictions and the objectives I pursue.

== Religious tensions ==
Pope John XXIII clashed with Castro in 1962 after Castro suppressed Catholic institutions in Cuba, and this led to later claims on the internet that Castro had been excommunicated. However, it appears that these claims are apocryphal. Castro has criticized what he sees as elements of the Bible that have been used to justify the oppression of both women and people of African descent throughout history.

== Treatment of religious issues as leader of Cuba ==
In his 1972 speech to Christians for Socialism in Chile, Castro called for an alliance between Christians and socialists:

When we look to history we see evolution. There was a time when the Christian religion, which used to be the religion of the slaves, became the religion of the emperors, of the court, the religion of patricians. As we go further into history, we see how men have made serious mistakes in the name of religion. I'm not going to talk about how men made even worse mistakes in their role as politicians. It was on the basis of such realities that I said we had to fight together to achieve these aims for, I ask where do the contradictions between Christian teachings and socialist teachings lie? Where? We both wish to struggle on behalf of man for the welfare of man, for the happiness of man.

Castro reaffirmed this stance in his speech to Jamaican Council of Churches in 1977, stating that "are no contradictions between the aims of religion and the aims of socialism". Castro clarified that while public education in Cuba was to have "an orientation that opposes the religious view in the fields of philosophy or history", he does not oppose the import of religious publications to Cuba and would finance individual churches if the local community requested one. He claimed that the Cuban revolution was unique in that it had "few conflicts with religion", which he ascribed to the "astuteness of church leaders, the growing number of progressive Christians, as well as to the desire of the Cuban government not to present the Revolution as an enemy of religion."

During a visit of Jesse Jackson in 1984, Castro accompanied him to a Methodist church service where he even spoke from the pulpit with a Bible before him, an event that marked further openness towards Christianity in Cuba.

In 1992, Castro agreed to loosen restrictions on religion, and even permitted church-going Catholics to join the Communist Party of Cuba. He began describing his country as "secular", rather than as "atheist". Pope John Paul II visited Cuba in 1998, the first visit by a reigning pontiff to the island. Castro and the Pope appeared side by side in public on several occasions during the visit. Castro wore a dark blue business suit, rather than fatigues, in his public meetings with the Pope, and treated him with reverence and respect. In December 1998, Castro formally re-instated Christmas Day as the official celebration for the first time since its abolition by the Communist Party of Cuba in 1969. Cubans were again allowed to mark Christmas as a holiday, and to openly hold religious processions. The Pope sent a telegram to Castro, thanking him for restoring Christmas as a public holiday.

Castro attended a Catholic convent blessing in 2003. The purpose of this unprecedented event was to introduce the newly restored convent in Old Havana and to mark the fifth anniversary of the Pope's visit to Cuba.

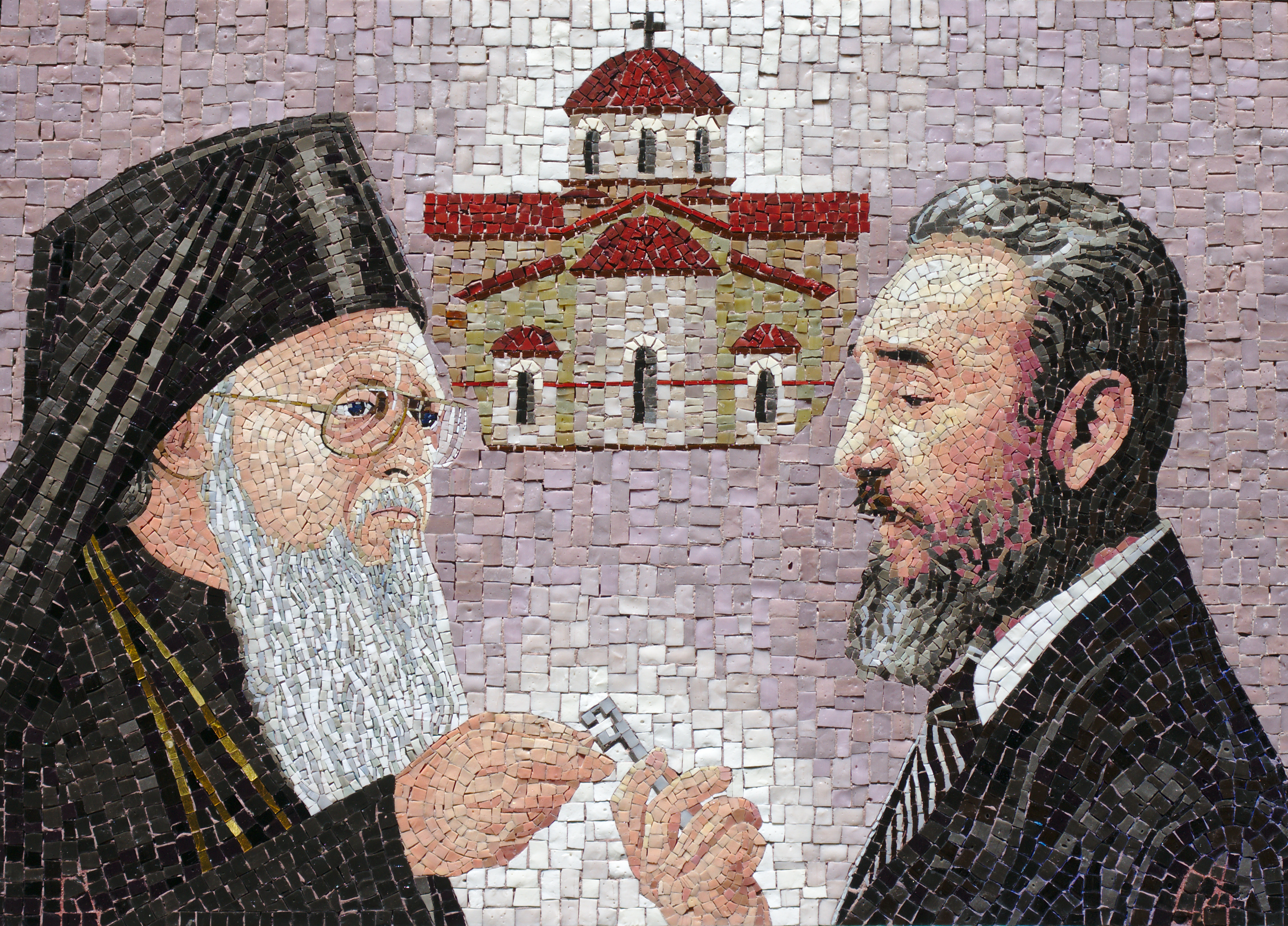
Mosaic of Castro giving keys to Bartholomew

The senior spiritual leader of the Orthodox Christian faith arrived in Cuba in 2004, the first time any Orthodox patriarch has visited Latin America in the Church's history. The prelate, Ecumenical Patriarch Bartholomew I, consecrated a cathedral in Havana and bestowed an honor on Castro. His aides said that he was responding to the decision of the Cuban Government to build and donate to the Orthodox Christians a small Orthodox cathedral in the heart of Old Havana.

After Pope John Paul II's death in April 2005, an emotional Castro attended a Mass in his honor in Havana's cathedral and signed the Pope's condolence book at the Vatican Embassy. He had last visited the cathedral in 1959, 46 years earlier, for the wedding of one of his sisters. Cardinal Jaime Lucas Ortega y Alamino led the Mass and welcomed Castro, who was dressed in a black suit, expressing his gratitude for the "heartfelt way that the death of our Holy Father John Paul II was received (in Cuba)."

In his 2009 spoken autobiography, Castro said that Christianity exhibited "a group of very humane precepts" which gave the world "ethical values" and a "sense of social justice", before relating that, "If people call me Christian, not from the standpoint of religion, but from the standpoint of social vision, I declare that I am a Christian." Castro also argued that the teachings of Jesus Christ can be seen as socialist:

If you follow the thread of that thought, you end up with a Socialist programme. It’s what the New Testament says, too, and Christian teaching. With the teachings of Christ you can formulate a radical Socialist programme, whether you’re a believer or not.

In his autobiography, Castro expressed respect towards the Catholic Church in particular, and praised John Paul II:

I felt a sincere and profound respect for that pope. I understood and admired his noble efforts on behalf of life and peace. No one opposed the war against Iraq as tenaciously and as constantly as he did. I’m absolutely certain that he would never have advised the Iraqis to allow themselves to be killed without defending themselves, nor would he have advised the Cubans to. He knew perfectly well that this is not a problem between Cubans; it’s a problem between the people of Cuba and the government of the United States. Not even Christ, who flogged the money-lenders out of the temple, would deny the right of a people to defend itself.

On March 28, 2012, Castro had a 30-minute meeting with Pope Benedict XVI during the Pope's three-day visit to Cuba. The Pope had previously called for an end to the U.S. embargo on Cuba, and the Pope made statements encouraging a more open Cuban society, while Castro asked the Pope about his role and about the changes the Church had experienced over the last century.

On September 20, 2015, Castro met with Pope Francis during the Pope's three-day visit to Cuba, where they discussed protecting the environment and the problems of the modern world.

== See also ==
- Politics of Fidel Castro
- Religion in Cuba
