= Nueva Presencia =

Group of artists in Mexico

Nueva Presencia (translated "new presence") was a group of artists founded by Arnold Belkin and Francisco Icaza in Mexico in the early 1960s. In response to the atrocities of World War II, the artists of Nueva Presencia rejected aestheticism in art, instead believing that artists had a responsibility to engage with social and political issues. A manifesto, published in the first issue of the magazine of the same name, outlined their views. Members of the group included Arnold Belkin, Francisco Corzas, Emilio Ortiz, Leonel Góngora, Artemio Sepúlveda, José Muño, Francisco Corzas, and Ignacio "Nacho" López.
