= Carlos María Gutiérrez =

Uruguayan writer, journalist and caricaturist

Carlos María Gutiérrez (1926–1991) was a Uruguayan writer, journalist and caricaturist. He was a notable contributor at Prensa Latina.

He was married to Lebanese-Uruguayan actress Dahd Sfeir.

== Selected works ==
- En la Sierra Maestra y otros reportajes, journalism (Tauro, 1967)
- ¿Integración latinoamericana?: de la Alianza para el Progreso a la OLAS, journalism (Cruz del Sur, 1967) with Marcos Gabay
- El agujero en la pared, humor (Arca, 1968) with illustrations by himself, signature «Gut»
- Diario del cuartel, poetry (Casa de las Américas, collection Los Premios, La Habana, 1970)
- El experimento dominicano, journalism (USA, 1972 - Mexico, 1974)
- Reportaje a Perón, journalism (Schapire Editor, Buenos Aires, 1974)
- Ernesto Che Guevara, journalism (unpublished, compilation by CEAL 1970-1971)
- Incluido afuera, poetry (Arca, 1988)
- Los ejércitos inciertos y otros relatos, short stories (Arca, 1991; Ediciones de la Banda Oriental, 2002)
