= Blanca Lagrotta =

Argentine actress

Blanca Lagrotta'
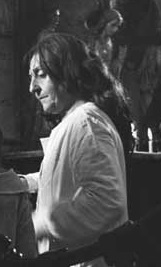
- Born: February 14, 1921; October 22, 1978 (aged 57)
- Occupation: Actress

Blanca Lagrotta (14 February 1921 – 22 October 1978) was an Argentine actress. She starred in films such as El nieto de Congreve (1949), Deshonra (1952), Mercado de abasto (1955), Setenta veces siete (1962), Amor libre (1969), Operación Masacre (1972), Un mundo de amor (1975) and El fantástico mundo de María Montiel (1978). In Leopoldo Torre Nilsson's 1962 picture Setenta veces siete she portrayed the Mother of Isabel Sarli's character. The film was entered into the 1962 Cannes Film Festival.
