= Operación Masacre =

1957 nonfiction crime novel by Rodolfo Walsh

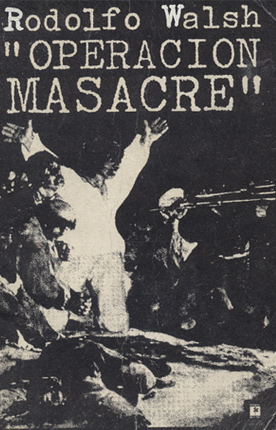
- Cover art from the first edition
- Author: Rodolfo Walsh
- Illustrator: Francisco de Goya y Lucientes
- Cover artist: Francisco de Goya y Lucientes
- Language: Spanish
- Genre: Nonfiction/Literature
- Publisher: Ediciones Sigla (First edition in original language); De La Flor
- Publication date: 1957
- Publication place: Argentina
- Media type: Print
- Pages: 236 pp (Paperback edition)
- ISBN: 978-950-515-352-7 (Paperback edition)
- OCLC: 11558530

Operación Masacre (English: "Operation Massacre") is a nonfiction novel of investigative journalism, written by noted Argentine journalist and author Rodolfo Walsh. It is considered by some to be the first of its genre. It was published in 1957, nine years before the publication of Truman Capote's In Cold Blood, a book often credited as the first major nonfiction novel of investigative journalism.

== Structure ==
The book is divided into three sections: in the first, Walsh provides portraits of the victims of the shooting; in the second, he reconstructs the events of the night in question; in the third, he shares testimonies from the head of the Buenos Aires Province Police, among others, that unequivocally betray the complicity of the de facto State and make a case for the unlawful and disgraceful execution of the men in question.

The most recent editions of the book in Spanish and English also include additions (listed as "Appendices") to the text written by Walsh for the various editions of the book that came out after its first publication in 1957.

== Synopsis ==
The book details the José León Suárez massacre, which involved the June 9, 1956 unlawful capture and shooting by the Buenos Aires Province Police of a group of civilians suspected of being involved with a Peronist uprising that same night, including the rebel leader General Juan José Valle. Walsh claims that the men were arrested before the establishment in that very same night of the martial law and that they also were never properly charged, therefore they were unlawfully shot. These events followed a 1955 military coup, known as Revolución Libertadora ("the Liberating Revolution"), which deposed Argentine president Juan Perón and eventually brought the right-wing dictatorship to power, led first by Lieutenant General Eduardo Lonardi – who was considered too "lenient" (with Peronism) by the leaders of the coup and quickly deposed – and later by the hard-line General Pedro Eugenio Aramburu.

== History ==
In December 1956, six months after the failed 9 June 1956 uprising by Juan José Valle and other Juan Perón supporters, Walsh, who was sitting in a café, playing chess, received a tip-off from a man who approached and said: "One of the executed men is alive." Operación Masacre was originally published in May–July 1957 as a series of articles in the journal Mayoría, where it was subtitled "A book without a publisher" as an indication of the problems Walsh had had securing an outlet for his story. These articles were later re-written into the book Operación Masacre.

In 2013, an annotated English translation by Daniella Gitlin, "Operation Massacre," was published by Seven Stories Press.

== Reception and criticism ==
Literary critic Ángel Rama described Operación Masacre as a "police novel for the poor." The novel explores themes of violence that are not only unexpected, but are also unpunished, although Pedro Eugenio Aramburu would ultimately be executed in 1970 by the Peronist Montoneros for his role in the José León Suárez massacre.

Daniel Link argues that the book "destabilizes literary genres" and anticipates what would later be called testimonial fiction. This form of writing has proven to be problematic to some literary analysts because some have seen the need to match the documented historical narrative with the events in the literary text itself, leading to challenges of verification for those seeking proof of historical accuracy and reliability.

== Film adaptation ==
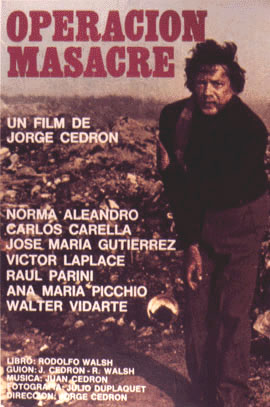
1973 film poster for Operación Masacre

Operación Masacre was adapted into a 1973 drama film written and directed by Jorge Cedrón and starring Norma Aleandro, Carlos Carella, Víctor Laplace, Ana María Picchio and one of the survivors of the José León Suárez massacre, Julio Troxler.
