= Miguel Alandia Pantoja =

Miguel Alandia Pantoja was a Bolivian muralist and revolutionary.
