= Bay of Pigs Invasion =

1961 failed landing operation of Cuba

- Part of the Cold War and the Consolidation of the Cuban Revolution
Date	17–20 April 1961; 65 years ago
Location	Bay of Pigs, southwestern coast of Cuba 22.0616°N 81.0319°W
Result	Cuban government victory

Belligerents
United States; Cuban DRF	Cuba

Commanders and leaders
John F. Kennedy; Robert McNamara; Robert F. Kennedy; Maxwell D. Taylor; Charles Cabell; Pepe San Román (POW); Erneido Oliva (POW) Manuel Artime (POW); Félix Rodríguez; Higinio "Nino" Díaz; Francisco Pérez Castro (POW); Ricardo Montero Duque (POW)	Fidel Castro; Che Guevara; Juan A. Bosque; Ramiro Valdés; Raúl Castro; Efigenio Ameijeiras; José Ramón Fernández

Units involved
CIA; Operation 40; Brigade 2506; U.S. Air Force; Alabama Air National Guard; U.S. Navy	Cuban Revolutionary Armed Forces; National Revolutionary Police Force; National Revolutionary Militia

Strength
1,500 ground forces (Note: 1,500 ground forces (including 177 paratroops) – c. 1,300 landed. Also Cuban exile and American aircrews, as well as CIA operatives); 16 B-26 Invader bombers 45 F4U Corsair fighters; 8 C-46 transport planes 6 C-54 transport planes; 5 M41 light tanks; 5 supply ships; 4 troop ships; Multiple artillery, mortars, Jeeps, and trucks	25,000 Cuban Army; 200,000 Militia; 9,000 armed National Police (Note: Across the country); 4 Lockheed T-33 jets; 4 Hawker Sea Fury fighters; 7 B-26 Invader bombers ^{( → Douglas A-26 Invader#CIA)}; 100+ tanks; T-34-85 medium tanks; IS-2 heavy tanks; SU-100 self-propelled guns; Several 76.2-mm and 122-mm artillery pieces

Casualties and losses
Brigade 2506: 114 killed; 360 wounded (Note: 118 invaders killed (114 Cuban exiles plus 4 American aircrew)); 1,202 captured (including wounded) (Note: 1,202 Brigade members captured (1,179 tried; 14 tried previously for pre-invasion crimes; 9 died in transit)); Hundreds executed; 5 B-26 bombers shot down; United States: 4 killed; 2 B-26 bombers shot down; 2 supply ships lost	Cuban Armed Forces: 176 killed; 400–500 wounded (Note: 176 Cuban government forces killed); 1 B-26 bomber shot down; 1 Hawker Sea Fury shot down; 1 patrol ship sunk; Unknown number of T-34-85 tanks and SU-100 guns destroyed; National Militia: 2,000 killed and wounded
- Location within Cuba

The Bay of Pigs Invasion, also known as Playa Girón in Cuba, after the beach where the battle took place, was a failed military landing operation on the southwestern coast of Cuba in April 1961 by the United States and the Cuban Democratic Revolutionary Front (DRF), consisting of Cuban exiles who opposed Fidel Castro's Cuban Revolution, clandestinely and directly financed by the U.S. government. The operation took place at the height of the Cold War, and its failure influenced relations between Cuba, the United States, and the Soviet Union.

By early 1960, President Dwight D. Eisenhower had begun contemplating ways to remove Castro. In accordance with this goal, Eisenhower eventually approved Richard Bissell's plan which included training the paramilitary force that would later be used in the Bay of Pigs Invasion. Alongside covert operations, the U.S. also began its embargo of the island. This led Castro to reach out to the U.S.'s Cold War rival, the Soviet Union, after which the U.S. severed diplomatic relations.

Cuban exiles who had moved to the U.S. following Castro's takeover had formed the counter-revolutionary military unit Brigade 2506, which was the armed wing of the DRF. The CIA funded the brigade, which also included approximately 60 members of the Alabama Air National Guard, and trained the unit in Guatemala. Over 1,400 paramilitaries, divided into five infantry battalions and one paratrooper battalion, assembled and launched from Guatemala and Nicaragua by boat on 17 April 1961. Two days earlier, eight CIA-supplied B-26 bombers had attacked Cuban airfields and then returned to the U.S. On the night of 17 April, the main invasion force landed on the beach at Playa Girón in the Bay of Pigs, where it overwhelmed a local revolutionary militia. Initially, José Ramón Fernández led the Cuban Revolutionary Army counter-offensive; later, Castro took personal control. As the invasion force lost the strategic initiative, the international community found out about the invasion, and U.S. president John F. Kennedy decided to withhold further air support. The plan, devised during Eisenhower's presidency, had required the involvement of U.S. air and naval forces. Without further air support, the invasion was being conducted with fewer forces than the CIA had deemed necessary. The invading force was defeated within three days by the Cuban Revolutionary Armed Forces (Spanish: Fuerzas Armadas Revolucionarias; FAR) and surrendered on 20 April. Most of the surrendered counter-revolutionary troops were publicly interrogated, incarcerated into Cuban prisons and subsequently prosecuted and tried.

The invasion was a U.S. foreign policy failure. The Cuban government's victory solidified Castro's role as a national hero and widened the political division between the two formerly friendly countries, as well as emboldened other Latin American groups to undermine U.S. influence in the region. As stated in a memoir from Chester Bowles: "The humiliating failure of the invasion shattered the myth of a New Frontier run by a new breed of incisive, fault-free supermen. However costly, it may have been a necessary lesson." It also pushed Cuba closer to the Soviet Union, setting the stage for the Cuban Missile Crisis in 1962.

== Background ==
=== United States interventions in Cuba ===
On 20 May 1902, a new independent government proclaimed the foundation of the Republic of Cuba, with U.S. military governor Leonard Wood handing over control to President Tomás Estrada Palma, a Cuban-born U.S. citizen. Subsequently, large numbers of U.S. settlers and businessmen arrived in Cuba, and by 1905, 60% of rural properties were owned by non-Cuban-born North American citizens. Between 1906 and 1909, 5,000 U.S. Marines were stationed across the island, and returned in 1912, 1917, and 1921 to intervene in internal affairs, sometimes at the behest of the Cuban government.

=== Constitution of 1940 ===
In 1940, Cuba adopted a new constitution which drew on many of the ideas of the Cuban Revolution of 1933. The Encyclopedia of U.S.–Latin American Relations purports that the 1940 constitution was one of the most progressive constitutions in Latin America, because it legally mandated social security, a minimum wage, health insurance, workers compensation, vacation time, the women's right to vote, and the right to free expression.

In 1940, the Cuban general and politician Fulgencio Batista was elected under the provisions of the new constitution. After his term ended in 1944, he was not legally allowed to run for a consecutive term, so he stepped down and moved to Florida. Batista returned to Cuba in 1948 to run for a presidential term starting in 1952.

=== CIA interventions ===
The CIA was founded in 1947 by the National Security Act. The agency was "a product of the Cold War", having been designed to counter the espionage activities of the Soviet Union's own national security agency, the KGB. As the perceived threat of international communism grew larger, the CIA expanded its activities to undertake covert economic, political, and military activities that would advance causes favorable to U.S. interests, often resulting in brutal dictatorships that favored U.S. interests. CIA Director Allen Dulles was responsible for overseeing covert operations across the world, and although widely considered an ineffectual administrator, he was popular among his employees, whom he had protected from the accusations of McCarthyism.

=== Cuban Revolution ===
Until Castro, the US was so overwhelmingly influential in Cuba that the American ambassador was the second most important man, sometimes even more important than the Cuban president.

— Earl E. T. Smith, former American Ambassador to Cuba, during 1960 testimony to the US Senate

In March 1952 Fulgencio Batista seized power on the island, proclaimed himself president, and deposed the discredited president Carlos Prío Socarrás of the Partido Auténtico. Batista canceled the planned presidential elections and described his new system as "disciplined democracy."

Although Batista gained some popular support, many Cubans saw it as the establishment of a one-man dictatorship. Many opponents of the Batista regime took to armed rebellion in an attempt to oust the government, sparking the Cuban Revolution. One of these groups was the National Revolutionary Movement (Movimiento Nacional Revolucionario), a militant organization containing largely middle-class members that had been founded by the Professor of Philosophy Rafael García Bárcena. Another was the Directorio Revolucionario Estudiantil, which had been founded by the Federation of University Students president José Antonio Echevarría.

However, the best known of these anti-Batista groups was the "26th of July Movement" (MR-26-7), founded by Fidel Castro. With Castro as the MR-26-7's head, the organization was based upon a clandestine cell system, with each cell containing ten members, none of whom knew the whereabouts or activities of the other cells.

Between December 1956 and 1959, Castro led a guerrilla army against the forces of Batista from his base camp in the Sierra Maestra mountains. Batista's repression of revolutionaries had earned him widespread unpopularity, and by 1958 his armies were in retreat. On 31 December 1958, Batista resigned and fled into exile, taking with him an amassed fortune of more than $300 million.

=== Provisional government ===
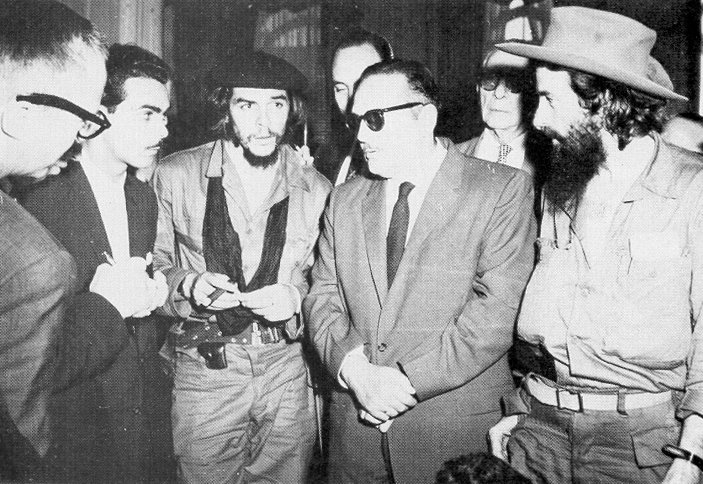
Provisional President of Cuba Manuel Urrutia with rebel leaders Che Guevara and Camilo Cienfuegos, 1959

After the success of the revolution a popular uproar across Cuba demanded that those figures who had been complicit in the widespread torture and killing of civilians be brought to justice. Although he remained a moderating force and tried to prevent the mass reprisal killings of Batistanos advocated by many Cubans, Castro helped to set up trials of many figures involved in the old regime across the country, resulting in hundreds of executions. Critics, in particular from the U.S. press, argued that many of these did not meet the standards of a fair trial, and condemned Cuba's new government as being more interested in vengeance than justice.

Castro retaliated strongly against such accusations, proclaiming that "revolutionary justice is not based on legal precepts, but on moral conviction." In a show of support for this "revolutionary justice", he organized the first Havana trial to take place before a mass audience of 17,000 at the Sports Palace stadium. When a group of 19 pilots accused of bombing a village was found not guilty, Castro ordered a retrial, in which they were found guilty and each sentenced to 30 years in prison.

In early January 1959, Fidel Castro appointed various economists such as Felipe Pazos, Rufo López-Fresquet, Ernesto Bentacourt, Faustino Pérez, and Manuel Ray Rivero. By June 1959, these appointed economists would begin to express disillusionment with Castro's proposed economic policies. On 16 February 1959, Castro took on the role of Prime Minister. The presidency fell to Castro's chosen candidate, the lawyer Manuel Urrutia Lleó, while members of the MR-26-7 took control of most positions in the cabinet.

In early 1959, the Cuban government began agrarian reforms which redistributed the ownership of Cuba's land. Expropriated lands would be put into state ownership, and the newly formed Instituto de la Reforma Agraria (INRA) was to oversee the expropriations and be headed by Fidel Castro. In Camagüey Province there was growing opposition to the Cuban government due to the resistance of conservative farmers to the agrarian reforms and distaste for Raúl Castro and Che Guevara's promotion of communist ideals in the local government and military. The anti-communist opposition within the Cuban government assumed that Fidel Castro was unaware of growing communist influence because of Fidel Castro's frequent public disavowals of communism.

In April 1959, Fidel Castro announced that elections were to be postponed in order to allow for the provisional government to focus on domestic reforms. Castro announced this electoral delay with the slogan: "revolution first, elections later". These postponed elections would later be outright canceled in May 1960.

On 17 July 1959, Conrado Bécquer, the sugar workers' leader, demanded Cuban president Urrutia's resignation. Castro himself resigned as Prime Minister of Cuba in protest, but later that day appeared on television to deliver a lengthy denouncement of Urrutia, claiming that Urrutia had "complicated" the government, and that his "fevered anti-communism" was having a detrimental effect. Castro's sentiments received widespread support as organized crowds surrounded the presidential palace demanding Urrutia's resignation, which was duly received. On July 23, Castro resumed his position as premier and appointed loyalist Osvaldo Dorticós as the new president.

=== Diplomatic decline ===
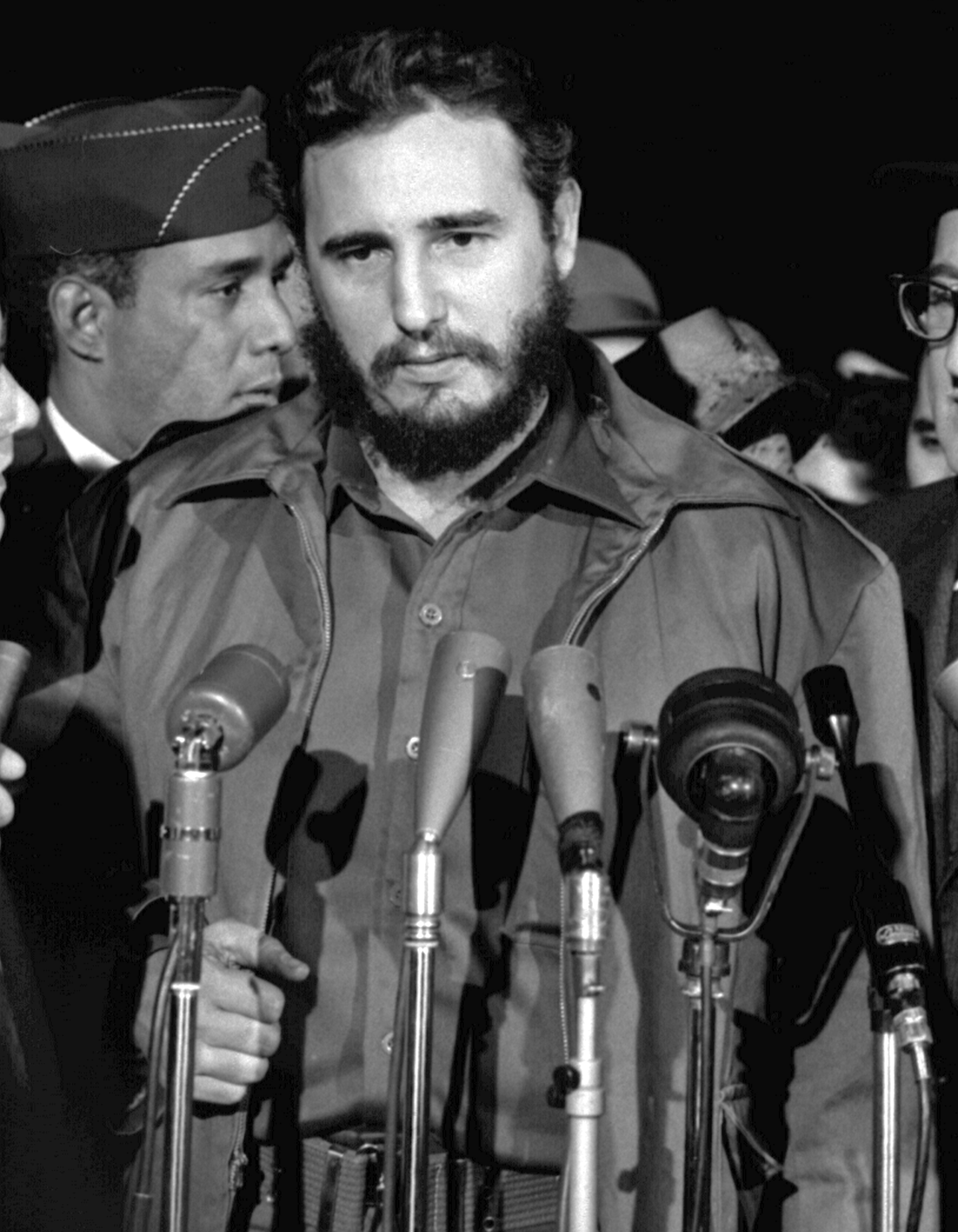
Fidel Castro speaking to the press in Washington D.C., during his 1959 tour of the United States

The U.S. initially recognized Castro's government after the Cuban Revolution ousted Batista, but the relationship quickly soured as Castro repeatedly condemned the U.S. in his speeches for its misdeeds in Cuba over the previous 60 years. Many U.S. officials began to view Castro as a threat to national security as he legalized the Communist Party, nationalized property owned by U.S. citizens totaling $1.5 billion, and strengthened ties with the Soviet Union.

In recently declassified documents, the feelings of the CIA toward Fidel Castro have become more clear. The CIA had written a comprehensive study of the background between the United States and Cuba, beginning with Castro's regime. This study was top secret and around 400 pages in length. At the very beginning of Castro, the CIA needed to decipher the alleged pro-communist beliefs. They had inside men working to make a clear decision on the belief of the new Cuban official. According to the Official History of the Bay of Pigs, the top-secret CIA document, two agents were placed in the ranks of the communist party of Cuba (Partido Socialista Popular). In 1958, both agents were either captured or snuck their way into the ranks of Fidel Castro's forces. They explained the so-called 'anti-American' sentiment of the regime.

In 1959, Fidel Castro planned on visiting America. The invitation was extended by the American Society of Newspaper Editors. The already tense relations between Cuba and the US became increasingly futile. According to the written document detailing the conflict, the Official History of the Bay of Pigs, written by the CIA, America was apprehensive. The CIA was aware that Castro would not plan on appealing to Heads of State, but instead, the masses, as he addressed the workers and farmers of America. The CIA was not impressed with Castro and believed that his officials and people among his ranks were Communists, and therefore the Castro regime was a Communist regime. Despite the optimistic and seemingly friendly view that Castro revealed, American officials were not convinced. They perceived Castro to be a serious threat, one that needed to be addressed.

== Prelude ==
=== Huber Matos affair ===
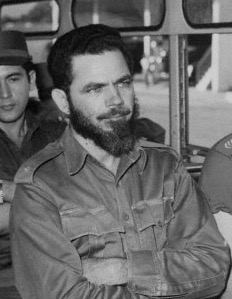
Cuban Army officer Huber Matos after his arrest, being transported to La Cabaña

On 20 October 1959, Cuban army commander and veteran of the Cuban Revolution, Huber Matos, resigned and accused Castro of "burying the revolution". Fifteen of Matos' officers resigned with him. Immediately after the resignation, Castro accused Matos of disloyalty and sent Camilo Cienfuegos to arrest Matos and his accompanying officers. Matos and the officers were taken to Havana and imprisoned in La Cabaña. Cuban communists later claimed Matos was helping plan a counter-revolution organized by the American Central Intelligence Agency (CIA) and other Castro opponents, an operation that became the Bay of Pigs Invasion.

The scandal is noted for its occurrence alongside a greater trend of removals of Castro's former collaborators in the revolution. It marked a turning point where Castro was beginning to exert more personal control over the new government in Cuba. Matos' arresting officer and former collaborator of Castro, Camilo Cienfuegos, would soon die in a mysterious plane crash shortly after the incident.

Shortly after Matos' arrest, the prime minister and Che Guevara made a speech to members of the INRA that Cuba would continue to turn in a socialist direction. Manuel Artime viewed the arrest of Matos and affirmation of socialism in Cuba as precedent for him to resign. On 7 November 1959 his resignation letter from INRA and the revolutionary army was published on the front page of Avance newspaper, one of the last newspapers not controlled by the government. Artime then entered an underground organization run by Jesuits in Cuba to hide fugitives; it is unclear what exactly made Artime immediately turn to hiding and later defect.

While in a Havana safehouse Artime formed the Movement for Revolutionary Recovery with other dissidents. Artime then contacted the American embassy in Havana, and on 14 December 1959, the CIA arranged for him to travel to the US on a Honduran freighter ship. He became closely involved with Gerry Droller (alias Frank Bender, alias "Mr. B") of the CIA in recruiting and organizing Cuban exiles in Miami for future actions against the Cuban government. Artime's organization MRR thus grew to become the principal counter-revolutionary movement inside Cuba, with supporting members in Miami, Mexico, Venezuela etc. Involved were Tony Varona, José Miró Cardona, Rafael Quintero, and Aureliano Arango. Infiltration into Cuba, arms drops, etc. were arranged by the CIA.

Artime became the future leader of Brigade 2506 in the Bay of Pigs Invasion. He gained this position from the notoriety he gained after defecting and engaging in a tour of Latin America denouncing the new government in Cuba. This notoriety as a Cuban dissident gave him credibility to be picked as the leader for the invasion when it was first conceived by the CIA.

=== Beginning of diplomatic tensions ===
Believing that Castro and his government were becoming increasingly hostile and openly opposed to the United States, Eisenhower directed the CIA to begin preparations for invading Cuba and overthrowing the Castro regime. An early plan to thwart Castro was devised on 11 February 1960 by Tracy Barnes, Jake Esterline, Al Cox, Dave Phillips, and Jim Flannery to sabotage both Cuban and American Sugar mills. They, along with Allen Dulles, director of the CIA at that point in time, decided that it would be a good preliminary course of action given that Castro's government was heavily dependent on the sugar industry. If they could sabotage it, that would hurt Castro financially and politically. Unfortunately, President Eisenhower was less than thrilled to attack Cuba's economy and sent Dulles back to the drawing board to devise plans involving covert action. If one was made, then it could be sent to special groups for approval and then discussion with the president again to carry on. Two men, however, decided to run full speed ahead with the sugar sabotage and cut back oil supply to Cuba while raising money for their sugar mission as well while the group in the office began to devise other plans to take down Castro. Richard M. Bissell Jr. was charged with overseeing plans for the Bay of Pigs Invasion. He assembled agents to aid him in the plot, many of whom had worked on the 1954 Guatemalan coup six years before; these included David Atlee Phillips, Gerry Droller, and E. Howard Hunt.

Bissell placed Droller in charge of liaising with anti-Castro segments of the Cuban American community living in the United States, and asked Hunt to fashion a government in exile, which the CIA would effectively control. Hunt proceeded to travel to Havana, where he spoke with Cubans from various backgrounds and discovered a brothel through the Mercedes-Benz agency. Returning to the U.S., he informed the Cuban Americans with whom he was liaising that they would have to move their base of operations from Florida to Mexico City, because the State Department refused to permit the training of a militia on U.S. soil. Although unhappy with the news, they conceded to the order.

On 17 March 1960, the CIA put forward their plan for the overthrow of Castro's administration to the U.S. National Security Council, where Eisenhower lent his support, approving a CIA budget of $13,000,000 to explore options to remove Castro from power. The first stated objective of the plan was to "bring about the replacement of the Castro regime with one more devoted to the true interests of the Cuban people and more acceptable to the U.S. in such a manner to avoid any appearance of U.S. intervention." Four major forms of action were to be taken to aid anti-communist opposition in Cuba at the time. These included providing a powerful propaganda offensive against the regime, perfecting a covert intelligence network within Cuba, developing paramilitary forces outside of Cuba, and acquiring the necessary logistical support for covert military operations on the island. At this stage, however, it was still not clear that an invasion would take place. Documents obtained from the Eisenhower Library revealed that Eisenhower had not ordered or approved plans for an amphibious assault on Cuba.

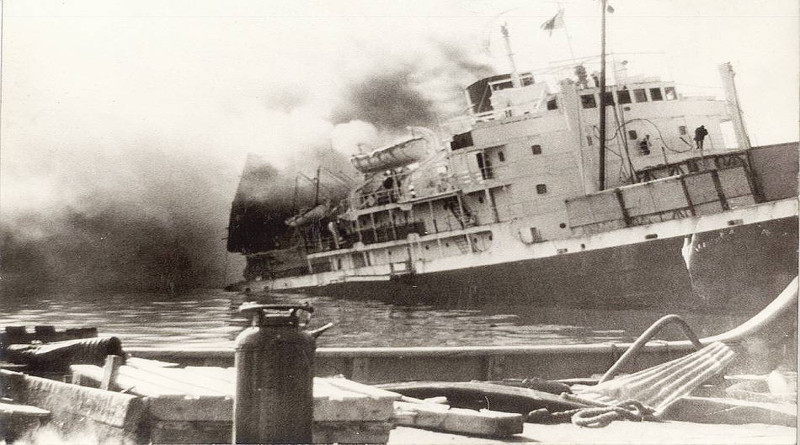
The ship La Coubre after exploding in the Havana harbor, 1960. Shortly afterward, Castro would deem the explosion a result of American sabotage, worsening US–Cuba relations.

In 1960, Castro's Cuban government ordered the country's oil refineries – then controlled by U.S. corporations Esso, Standard Oil, and Shell – to process crude oil purchased from the Soviet Union, but under pressure from the U.S. government, these companies refused. Castro responded by expropriating the refineries and nationalizing them under state control. In retaliation, the U.S. canceled its import of Cuban sugar, provoking Castro to nationalize most U.S.-owned assets, including banks and sugar mills. Relations between Cuba and the U.S. were further strained following the explosion and sinking of a French vessel, the La Coubre, in Havana Harbor in March 1960. The cause of the explosion was never determined, but Castro publicly mentioned that the U.S. government was guilty of sabotage.

=== Political opposition in Cuba ===
In the immediate aftermath of the Cuban Revolution, the rebels appointed José Miró Cardona as prime minister of Cuba. After two months in office, Cardona resigned as Prime Minister, and a year later fled to Miami. While in Miami, Cardona frequently wrote how the Cuban Revolution was a necessary progressive step politically and economically, but that Castro was betraying the democratic goals of the revolution. Cardona later became heavily involved with the Revolutionary Council that coordinated the Bay of Pigs invasion.

Castro's government engaged in various crackdowns on internal opposition, arresting hundreds of dissidents. Though it rejected the physical torture Batista's regime had used, Castro's government sanctioned psychological torture, subjecting some prisoners to solitary confinement, rough treatment, hunger, and threatening behavior. After conservative editors and journalists began expressing hostility toward the government following its leftward turn, the pro-Castro printers' trade union began to harass and disrupt editorial staff actions. In January 1960, the government proclaimed that each newspaper was obliged to publish a "clarification" by the printers' union at the end of every article that criticized the government. These "clarifications" signaled the start of press censorship in Castro's Cuba.

On May Day, 1960, Fidel Castro would outright condemn elections as corrupt, and cancel all future elections. Castro claimed the revolution had created an informal direct democracy, in which the people and the government had a close bond. In contrast, critics condemned the new regime as un-democratic. The U.S. Secretary of State Christian Herter announced that Cuba was adopting the Soviet model of communist rule, with a one-party state, government control of trade unions, suppression of civil liberties, and the absence of freedom of speech and press.

In the summer of 1960, major fidelistas were breaking with Castro, and forming dissident groups. Former government ministers Manuel Ray, and Rufo Lopez-Fresquet, as well as labor leader David Salvador, formed the Movimiento Revolucionario del Pueblo, advocating for a "Fidelismo without Fidel", meaning that Castro's social reforms should continue, but not Castro's personal consolidation of power.

In June 1960, the Cuban Democratic Revolutionary Front announced its existence in Mexico City. It hoped to serve as an umbrella organization for various Cuban opposition groups. The included groups were the Constitutional Democratic Rescue Organization, the Movement for Revolutionary Recovery, the Montecristi Organization, the Christian Democrat Movement, the Triple A Organization, and the Anti-Communist Associations Bloc. The super-group criticized Castro's removal of civil liberties, and demanded the restoration of the constitution of 1940. Most of the participating opposition groups had already been active in the earlier opposition to Batista.

=== Growing diplomatic tensions ===
The U.S. government was becoming increasingly critical of Castro's revolutionary government. At an August 1960 meeting of the Organization of American States (OAS) held in Costa Rica, U.S. Secretary of State Christian Herter publicly proclaimed that Castro's administration was "following faithfully the Bolshevik pattern" by instituting a single-party political system, taking governmental control of trade unions, suppressing civil liberties, and removing both the freedom of speech and freedom of the press. He furthermore asserted that international communism was using Cuba as an "operational base" for spreading revolution in the western hemisphere, and called on other OAS members to condemn the Cuban government for its breach of human rights. In turn, Castro lambasted the treatment of black people and the working classes he had witnessed in New York City, which he ridiculed as that "superfree, superdemocratic, superhumane, and supercivilized city." Proclaiming that the U.S. poor were living "in the bowels of the imperialist monster," he attacked the mainstream U.S. media and accused it of being controlled by big business. Superficially the U.S. was trying to improve its relationship with Cuba. Several negotiations between representatives from Cuba and the U.S. took place around this time. Repairing international financial relations was the focal point of these discussions. Political relations were another hot topic of these conferences. The U.S. stated that they would not interfere with Cuba's domestic affairs but that the island should limit its ties with the Soviet Union.

Tensions percolated when the CIA began to act on its desires to snuff out Castro. Efforts to assassinate Castro officially commenced in 1960, though the U.S. public did not become aware of them until 1975, when the Senate Church Committee, set up to investigate CIA abuses, released a report entitled "Alleged Assassination Plots Involving Foreign Leaders". Some methods that the CIA undertook to assassinate Castro were creative, for example: "poison pills, an exploding seashell, and a planned gift of a diving suit contaminated with toxins." More traditional ways of assassinating Castro were also planned, such as elimination via high-powered rifles with telescopic sights.

In August 1960, the CIA contacted the Cosa Nostra in Chicago with the intention to draft simultaneous assassinations of Fidel Castro, Raúl Castro, and Che Guevara. In exchange, if the operation were a success and a pro-U.S. government were restored in Cuba, the CIA agreed that the Mafia would get their "monopoly on gaming, prostitution and drugs". In 1963, at the same time the Kennedy administration initiated secret peace overtures to Castro, Cuban revolutionary and undercover CIA agent Rolando Cubela was tasked with killing Castro by CIA official Desmond Fitzgerald, who portrayed himself as a personal representative of Robert F. Kennedy.

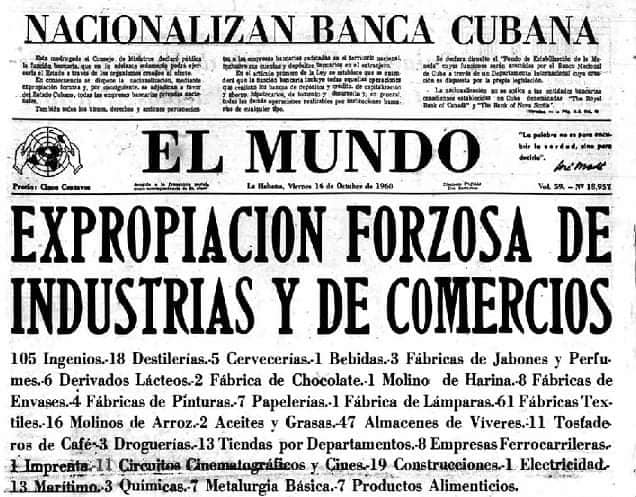
Cuban newspaper announcing the nationalization of industries (October 16, 1960)

On 13 October 1960, the U.S. government prohibited the majority of exports to Cuba – the exceptions being medicines and certain foodstuffs – marking the start of an economic embargo. In retaliation, the Cuban National Institute for Agrarian Reform took control of 383 private-run businesses on 14 October, and on 25 October a further 166 U.S. companies operating in Cuba had their premises seized and nationalized, including Coca-Cola and Sears Roebuck. On 16 December, the U.S. ended its import quota of Cuban sugar.

By 31 October 1960, most guerrilla infiltrations and supply drops directed by the CIA into Cuba had failed, and developments of further guerrilla strategies were replaced by plans to mount an initial amphibious assault, with a minimum of 1,500 men. The election of John Kennedy as U.S. president sped up preparations for the invasion; Kennedy had specifically denied any support for Batista supporters: "Batista murdered 20,000 Cubans in seven years – a greater proportion of the Cuban population than the proportion of Americans who died in both World Wars, and he turned Democratic Cuba into a complete police state – destroying every individual liberty."

=== 1960 presidential election ===
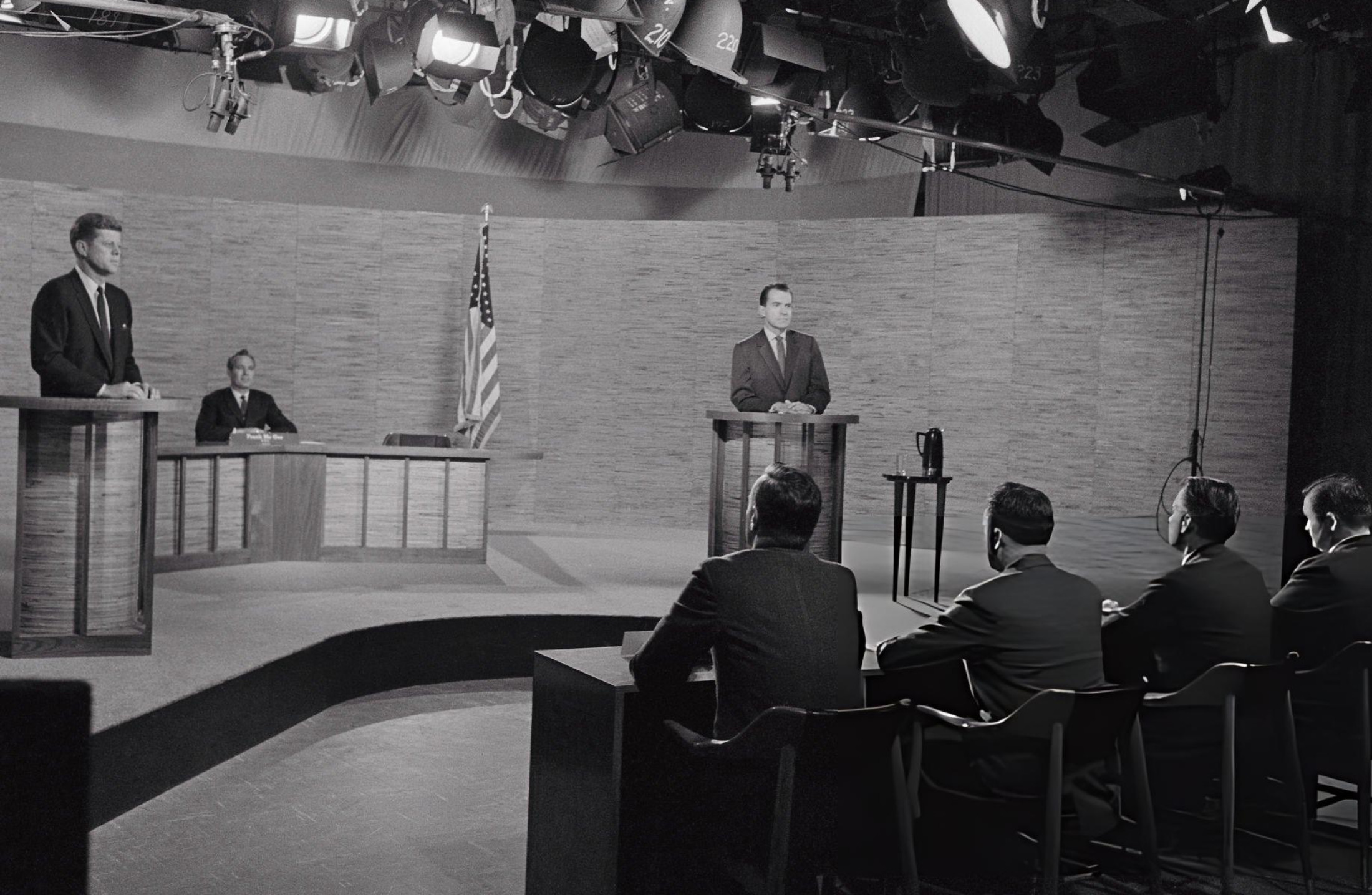
Nixon and Kennedy debating during the 1960 US presidential election

Cuba became a focal point in the 1960 U.S. presidential election, with both candidates promising to "get tough with the Communists". Kennedy in particular attacked Nixon and the Eisenhower administration for allowing communism to flourish so close to the U.S. In response, Nixon revealed plans for an embargo against Cuba, but the Democrats criticized it as ineffective. Both main candidates, Richard Nixon of the Republican Party and Kennedy of the Democratic Party, campaigned on the issue of Cuba, with both candidates taking a hardline stance on Castro.

Nixon – who was then vice president – insisted that Kennedy should not be informed of the military plans, to which Dulles conceded. To Nixon's chagrin, the Kennedy campaign released a scathing statement on the Eisenhower administration's Cuba policy on 20 October 1960 which said that "we must attempt to strengthen the non-Batista democratic anti-Castro forces [...] who offer eventual hope of overthrowing Castro", claiming that "Thus far these fighters for freedom have had virtually no support from our Government." At the last election debate the next day, Nixon called Kennedy's proposed course of action "dangerously irresponsible" and even lectured Kennedy on international law, in effect denigrating the policy that Nixon himself favored.

Ultimately, Nixon lost the election, convinced that Cuba had brought him down, and Kennedy inherited the thorny issue near the height of its prominence.

Despite the focus on Cuba in the elections and deteriorating relations between Cuba and the U.S. – exacerbated when Castro accused most of the U.S. State Department personnel in Havana of being spies and subsequently ordering them to leave the country, to which Eisenhower responded by withdrawing recognition of Castro's government –

=== Briefing of Kennedy ===
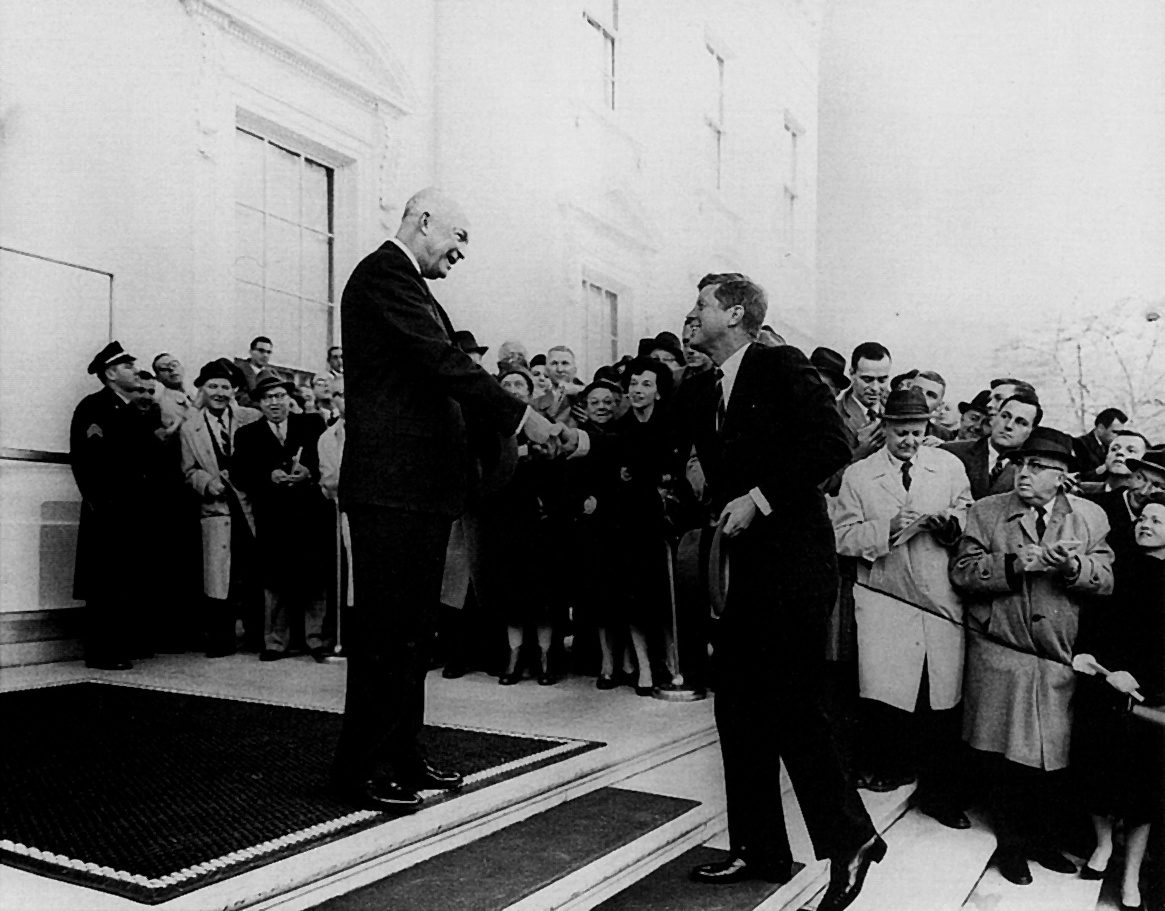
Eisenhower greets Kennedy at the White House. December 6, 1960.

On 18 November 1960, Dulles and Bissell first briefed President-elect Kennedy on the outline plans. Having experience in actions such as the 1954 Guatemalan coup d'état, Dulles was confident that the CIA was capable of overthrowing the Cuban government. On 29 November 1960, Eisenhower met with the chiefs of the CIA, Defense, State and Treasury departments to discuss the new concept. None expressed any objections, and Eisenhower approved the plans with the intention of persuading Kennedy of their merit. On 8 December 1960, Bissell presented outline plans to the "Special Group" while declining to commit details to written records. Further development of the plans continued, and on 4 January 1961 they consisted of an intention to establish a "lodgement" by 750 men at an undisclosed site in Cuba, supported by considerable air power.

Eisenhower had meetings with President-elect Kennedy at the White House on 6 December 1960 and 19 January 1961. In one conversation, Eisenhower stated that since March 1960, the U.S. government had trained "in small units – but we had done nothing else – [...] some hundreds of refugees" in Guatemala, "a few in Panama, and some in Florida." However, Eisenhower also expressed disapproval of the idea of Batista returning to power and was waiting for the exiles to agree on a leader who was opposed to both Castro and Batista.

As Eisenhower's tenure in office expired, John F. Kennedy replaced him as the president of the United States. Having come to power and being adequately informed about the plans to invade Cuba, President Kennedy did not take any action until mid-March 1961. Kennedy hesitated to commit to the CIA's plans. Under Dulles and Bissell's insistence of the increasingly urgent need to do something with the troops being trained in Guatemala, Kennedy eventually agreed, although to avoid the appearance of American involvement, he requested the operation be moved from the city of Trinidad, Cuba to a less conspicuous location. Thus, the final plan was for an invasion at the Bay of Pigs.

Kennedy's immediate actions concerning the invasion could be traced to 11 and 15 March 1961, and were directly connected to the consideration of the best possible invasion strategy. First, it was the TRINIDAD plan that was debated which, before Kennedy took office, was commonly agreed as the main plan to be deployed during the Cuban invasion. The TRINIDAD plan aimed to use ships and boats to land troops on the coast of Cuba. This was to be done in conjunction with the deployment of soldiers from airplanes and helicopters to quickly secure areas inside Cuba. The support from the sea and air was planned to start simultaneously with the military landing deployment, and not before them.

In addition, the TRINIDAD plan also considered a preemptive attack on Castro's airfields in the days leading up to the main operation which was termed the Pre-Day strikes. This was aimed to weaken Cuba's aerial defense capabilities before the actual invasion was to be carried out. Among other things, the TRINIDAD plan was to utilize six US pilots. This was such that each pilot, flying a B-26, was to hit one or more of the fields where Castro's combat aircraft were stationed. However, with Kennedy assuming power, and as discussions continued, the TRINIDAD plan became less strategic, and was to be replaced with a more strategic plan named the ZAPATA.

This was not just a simple tweak but a shift toward a more specific target area within Cuba. It aimed to focus on executing a combined sea and air landing operation in the ZAPATA region. The ZAPATA plan anticipated the immediate use of B-26 aircraft, which were to be brought in and operated from a temporary airstrip at Playa Girón as soon as the troops landed. President Kennedy's call to settle on the ZAPATA plan was based on the advice of Mr. Rusk, who was a CIA planner. Kennedy and the CIA viewed ZAPATA as a more immediate air support that would ensure the protection of the invaders from Castro's counterattacks. And, more importantly, as cover to maintain the secrecy of the U.S. involvement to the outside world. However, it was obvious that Operation ZAPATA did not align with the conditions Kennedy had set for approving such a mission, particularly regarding fallback options.

== Preparation ==
=== Kennedy's approval ===
John F. Kennedy answered difficult questions on Cuba on 12 April, only five days before the invasion.

On 28 January 1961, Kennedy was briefed, together with all the major departments, on the latest plan (code-named Operation Pluto), which involved 1,000 men landed in a ship-borne invasion at Trinidad, Cuba, about 270 km (170 mi) south-east of Havana, at the foothills of the Escambray Mountains in Sancti Spiritus province. Kennedy authorized the active departments to continue and to report progress. Trinidad had good port facilities, it was closer to many existing counter-revolutionary activities, and it offered an escape route into the Escambray Mountains. That scheme was subsequently rejected by the State Department because the airfield there was not large enough for B-26 bombers and, since B-26s were to play a prominent role in the invasion, this would destroy the façade that the invasion was just an uprising with no American involvement. Secretary of State Dean Rusk raised some eyebrows by contemplating airdropping a bulldozer to extend the airfield. Kennedy rejected Trinidad, preferring a more low-key locale. On 4 April 1961, Kennedy approved the Bay of Pigs plan (also known as Operation Zapata), because it had a sufficiently long airfield, it was farther away from large groups of civilians than the Trinidad plan, and it was less "noisy" militarily, which would make denial of direct U.S. involvement more plausible. The invasion landing area was changed to beaches bordering the Bahía de Cochinos (Bay of Pigs) in Las Villas Province, 150 km southeast of Havana, and east of the Zapata Peninsula. The landings were to take place at Playa Girón (code-named Blue Beach), Playa Larga (code-named Red Beach), and Caleta Buena Inlet (code-named Green Beach).

Top aides to Kennedy, such as Rusk and both joint chiefs of staff, later said that they had hesitations about the plans but muted their thoughts. Some leaders blamed these problems on the "Cold War mindset" or the determination of the Kennedy brothers to oust Castro and fulfill campaign promises. Military advisers were skeptical of its potential for success as well. Despite these hesitations, Kennedy still ordered the attack to take place.

=== Recruitment and training ===
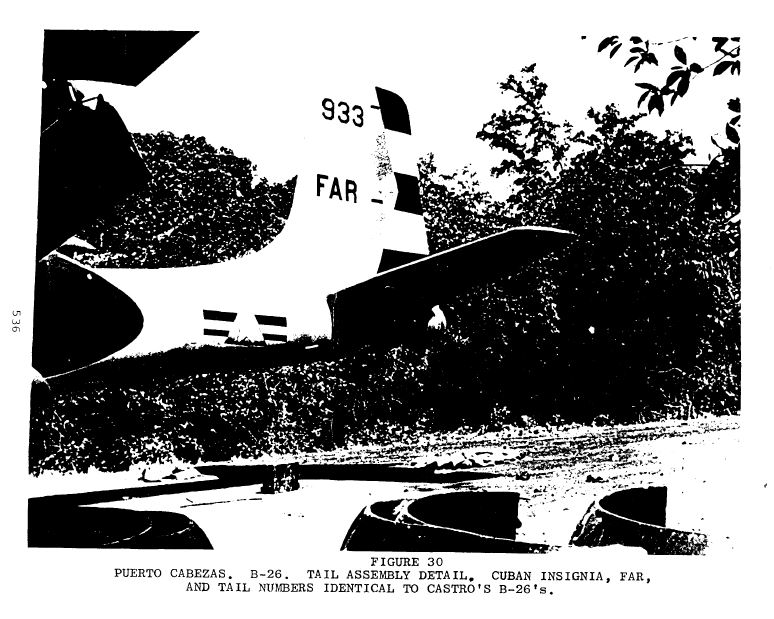
Douglas A-26 Invader "B-26" bomber aircraft disguised as a Cuban model

Beginning in April 1960, Democratic Revolutionary Front rebels were taken to Useppa Island, Florida, which was covertly leased by the CIA at the time. Useppa Island served as the locale for assessment and training. Once the rebels had arrived, they were greeted by instructors from U.S. Army Special Forces groups, members of the U.S. Air Force and the Alabama Air National Guard, and members of the CIA. The rebels were trained in amphibious assault tactics, guerrilla warfare, infantry and weapons training, unit tactics, and land navigation. At the head of the operation was Joaquin Sanjenis Perdomo, former police chief in Cuba, and intelligence officer Rafael De Jesus Gutierrez. The group included David Atlee Philips, Howard Hunt, and David Sánchez Morales. The recruiting of Cuban exiles in Miami was organized by CIA staff officers E. Howard Hunt and Gerry Droller. Detailed planning, training, and military operations were conducted by Jacob Esterline, Colonel Jack Hawkins, Félix Rodríguez, Rafael De Jesus Gutierrez, and Colonel Stanley W. Beerli, under the direction of Richard Bissell and his deputy Tracy Barnes.

The force that became Brigade 2506 started with 28 men, who initially were told that their training was being paid for by an anonymous Cuban millionaire émigré, but the recruits soon guessed who was paying the bills, calling their supposed anonymous benefactor "Uncle Sam", and the pretense was dropped. The overall leader was Dr. Manuel Artime while the military leader was José "Pepe" Peréz San Román, a former Cuban National Army officer imprisoned under both Batista and Castro.

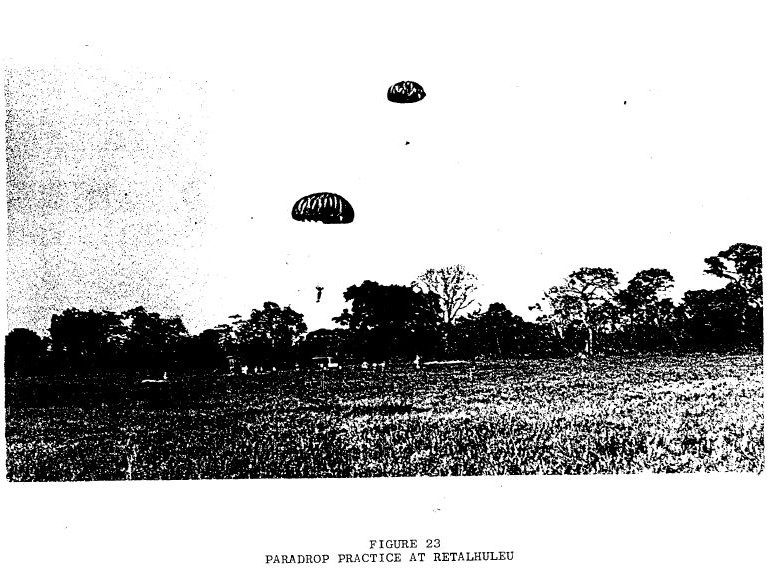
Cuban defectors practicing parachute drops

For the increasing number of recruits, infantry training was carried out at a CIA-run base code-named JMTrax. The base was on the Pacific coast of Guatemala between Quetzaltenango and Retalhuleu, in the Helvetia coffee plantation. The exiled group named themselves Brigade 2506 (Brigada Asalto 2506). In summer 1960, an airfield (code-named JMadd, aka Rayo Base) was constructed near Retalhuleu, Guatemala. Gunnery and flight training of Brigade 2506 aircrews was carried out by personnel from the Alabama Air National Guard under General Reid Doster, using at least six Douglas B-26 Invaders in the markings of the Guatemalan Air Force.

An additional 26 B-26s were obtained from U.S. military stocks, 'sanitized' at 'Field Three' to obscure their origins, and about 20 of them were converted for offensive operations by removal of defensive armament, standardization of the 'eight-gun nose', and addition of underwing drop tanks and rocket racks. Paratroop training was at a base nicknamed Garrapatenango, near Quetzaltenango, Guatemala. Training for boat handling and amphibious landings took place at Vieques Island, Puerto Rico.

Tank training for the Brigade 2506 using M41 Walker Bulldog light tanks took place at Fort Knox, Kentucky and Fort Benning, Georgia. Underwater demolition and infiltration training took place at Belle Chasse near New Orleans. To create a navy, the CIA purchased five cargo ships from the Cuban-owned, Miami-based Garcia Line, thereby giving "plausible deniability" as the State Department had insisted no U.S. ships could be involved in the invasion. The first four of the five ships, namely the Atlántico, the Caribe, the Houston, and the Río Escondido were to carry enough supplies and weapons to last thirty days while the Lake Charles had 15 days of supplies and was intended to land the provisional government of Cuba. The ships were loaded with supplies at New Orleans and sailed to Puerto Cabezas, Nicaragua. Additionally, the invasion force had two old Landing Craft Infantry (LCI) ships, the Blagar and Barbara J from World War II that were part of the CIA's "ghost ship" fleet and served as command ships for the invasion. The crews of the supply ships were Cuban while the crews of the LCIs were Americans, borrowed by the CIA from the Military Sea Transportation Service (MSTS). One CIA officer wrote that MSTS sailors were all professional and experienced but not trained for combat.

=== Acquiring supplies ===
From June to September 1960, the most time-consuming task was the acquisition of the aircraft to be used in the invasion. The anti-Castro effort depended on the success of these aircraft. Although models such as the Curtiss C-46 Commando and Douglas C-54 Skymaster were to be used for airdrops and bomb drops as well as for infiltration and exfiltration, they were looking for an aircraft that could perform tactical strikes. The two models that were going to be decided on were the Navy's Douglas AD-5 Skyraider or the Air Force's light bomber, the Douglas B-26 Invader. The AD-5 was readily available and ready for the Navy to train pilots, and in a meeting among a special group in the office of the Deputy Director of the CIA, the AD-5 was approved and decided upon. After a cost-benefit analysis, word was sent that the AD-5 plan would be abandoned and the B-26 would take its place.

In November 1960, the Retalhuleu recruits took part in quelling an officers' rebellion in Guatemala, in addition to the intervention of the U.S. Navy. The CIA transported people, supplies, and arms from Florida to all the bases at night, using Douglas C-54 transports.

On 9 April 1961, Brigade 2506 personnel, ships, and aircraft started transferring from Guatemala to Puerto Cabezas. Curtiss C-46s were also used for transport between Retalhuleu and a CIA base (code-named JMTide, aka Happy Valley) at Puerto Cabezas.

Facilities and limited logistical assistance were provided by the governments of General Miguel Ydígoras Fuentes in Guatemala, and General Luis Somoza Debayle in Nicaragua, but no military personnel or equipment of those nations was directly employed in the conflict. Both governments later received military training and equipment, including some of the CIA's remaining B-26s.

In early 1961, Cuba's army possessed Soviet-designed T-34-85 medium tanks, IS-2 heavy tanks, SU-100 tank destroyers, 122 mm howitzers, other artillery and small arms plus Italian 105 mm howitzers. The Cuban air force armed inventory included B-26 Invader light bombers, Hawker Sea Fury fighters, and Lockheed T-33 jets, all remaining from the Fuerza Aérea del Ejército de Cuba, the Cuban air force of the Batista government. Anticipating an invasion, Che Guevara stressed the importance of an armed civilian populace, stating: "all of the Cuban people must become a guerrilla army; each and every Cuban must learn to handle and if necessary use firearms in defense of the nation".

=== Cuban Revolutionary Council ===
Three weeks before the invasion, in March 1961, the Cuban Revolutionary Council (Spanish: Consejo Revolucionario Cubano, CRC) was formed, with CIA assistance, to "coordinate and direct" the activities of the Cuban Democratic Revolutionary Front. José Miró Cardona, former Prime Minister of Cuba, was chairman of the Cuban Revolutionary Council. Miró became the de facto leader-in-waiting of the intended post-invasion Cuban government. The CRC comprised the former Cuban Democratic Revolutionary Front, with the addition of the Movimiento Revolucionario del Pueblo. Manuel Artime was sent to Guatemala to serve as the Revolutionary Council's liaison with the invaders in training.

The CRC's board of directors were: Antonio de Varona, Justo Carrillo, Carlos Hevia, Antonio Maceo, Manuel Ray, and Manuel Artime. The stated goal of the Cuban Revolutionary Council was to establish a provisional government in Cuba, and reestablish the constitution of 1940.

== Security of Cuba ==
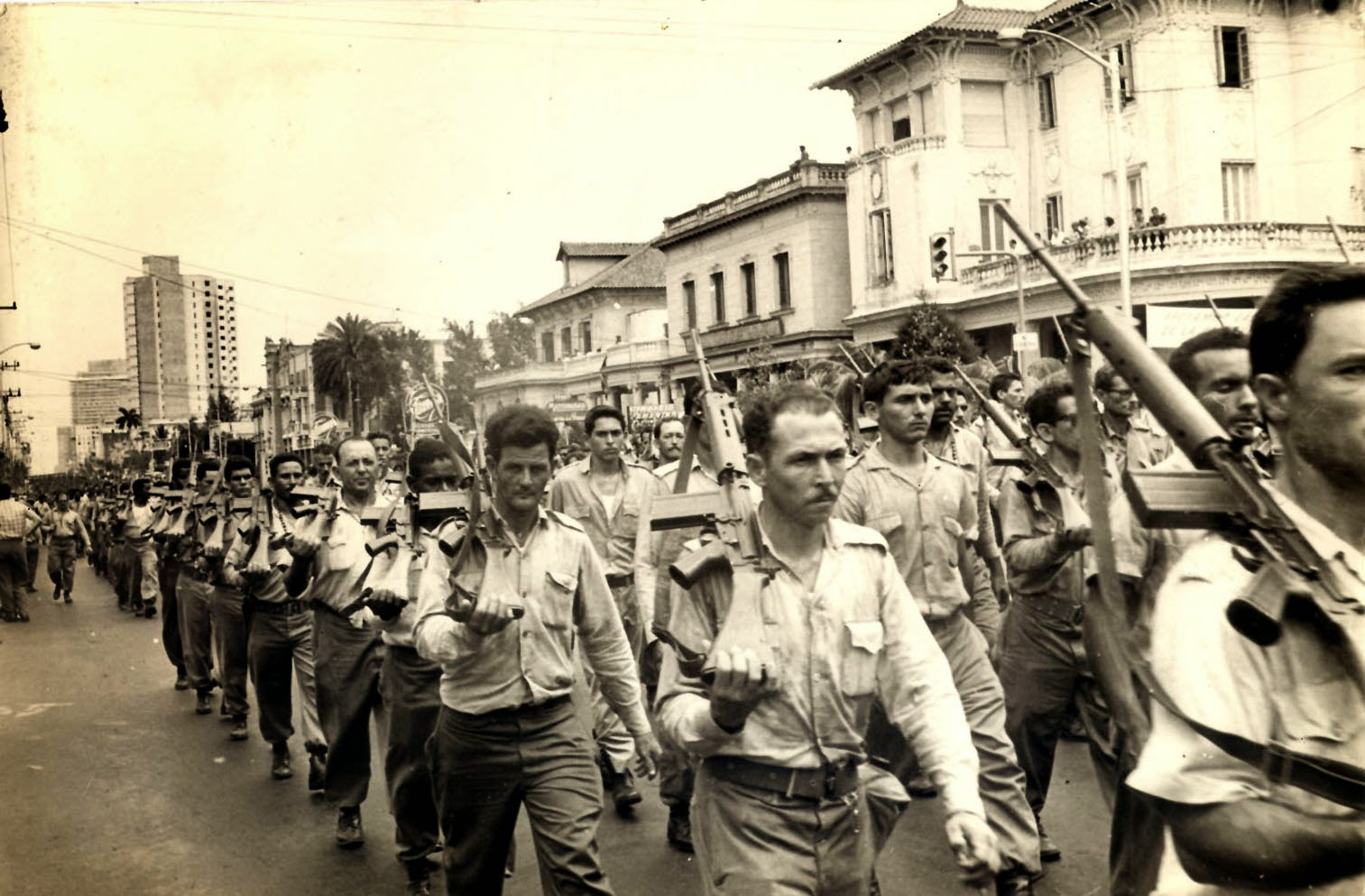
Cuban militia in Havana, 1959

=== Cuban government personnel ===
Already, Fidel Castro was known as, and addressed as, the commander-in-chief of Cuban Armed Forces, with a nominal base at "Point One" in Havana. In early April 1961, his brother Raúl Castro was assigned command of forces in the east, based in Santiago de Cuba. Che Guevara commanded western forces, based in Pinar del Río. Major Juan Almeida Bosque commanded forces in the central provinces, based in Santa Clara. Raúl Curbelo Morales was head of the Cuban Air Force. Sergio del Valle Jiménez was Director of Headquarters Operations at Point One. Efigenio Ameijeiras was the Head of the Revolutionary National Police. Ramiro Valdés Menéndez was Minister of the Interior and head of G-2 (Seguridad del Estado, or state security). His deputy was Comandante Manuel Piñeiro Losada, also known as 'Barba Roja'. Captain José Ramón Fernández was head of the School of Militia Leaders (Cadets) at Matanzas.

Other commanders of units during the conflict included Major Raúl Menéndez Tomassevich, Major Filiberto Olivera Moya, Major René de los Santos, Major Augusto Martínez Sánchez, Major Félix Duque, Major Pedro Miret, Major Flavio Bravo, Major Antonio Lussón, Captain Orlando Pupo Peña, Captain Victor Dreke, Captain Emilio Aragonés, Captain Ángel Fernández Vila, Arnaldo Ochoa, and Orlando Rodríguez Puerta. Soviet-trained Spanish advisors were brought to Cuba from Eastern Bloc countries. These advisors had held high staff positions in the Soviet armies during World War II and became known as "Hispano-Soviets", having long resided in the Soviet Union. The most senior of these was the Spanish communist veterans of the Spanish Civil War, Francisco Ciutat de Miguel, Enrique Líster, and Cuban-born Alberto Bayo. Ciutat de Miguel (Cuban alias: Ángel Martínez Riosola, commonly referred to as "Angelito"), was an advisor to forces in the central provinces. The role of other Soviet agents at the time is uncertain, but some of them acquired greater fame later. For example, KGB colonels Vadim Kochergin and Victor Simanov were first sighted in Cuba in about September 1959.

=== Internal strife ===
Militant counter-revolutionary groups developed soon after the revolution in an attempt to overthrow the new regime. Undertaking armed attacks against government forces, some set up guerrilla bases in Cuba's mountainous regions, leading to the six-year Escambray Rebellion. These dissidents were funded and armed by various foreign sources, including the exiled Cuban community, the CIA and Rafael Trujillo's regime in the Dominican Republic.

During this conflict former rebels from the war against Batista took different sides. On 3 April 1961, a bomb attack on militia barracks in Bayamo killed four militia and wounded eight more. On 6 April, the Hershey Sugar factory in Matanzas was destroyed by sabotage. On 14 April 1961, guerrillas led by Agapito Rivera fought Cuban government forces in Villa Clara Province, where several government troops were killed and others wounded. Also on 14 April 1961, a Cubana airliner was hijacked and flown to Jacksonville, Florida; resultant confusion then helped the staged 'defection' of a B-26 military aircraft and pilot at Miami on 15 April.

=== Prior warnings of invasion ===
The Cuban security apparatus knew the invasion was coming, in part due to indiscreet talk by members of the brigade, some of which was heard in Miami and repeated in U.S. and foreign newspaper reports. Nevertheless, days before the invasion, multiple acts of sabotage were carried out, such as the El Encanto fire, an arson attack in a department store in Havana on 13 April that killed one shop worker. The Cuban government also had been warned by senior KGB agents Osvaldo Sánchez Cabrera and 'Aragon', who died violently before and after the invasion, respectively. The general Cuban population was not well informed of intelligence matters, which the US sought to exploit with propaganda through CIA-funded Radio Swan. As of May 1960, almost all means of public communication were under public ownership.

On 29 April 2000, a Washington Post article, "Soviets Knew Date of Cuba Attack", reported that the CIA had information indicating that the Soviet Union knew the invasion was going to take place and did not inform Kennedy. On 13 April 1961, Radio Moscow broadcast an English-language newscast, predicting the invasion "in a plot hatched by the CIA" using paid "criminals" within a week. The invasion took place four days later.

David Ormsby-Gore, the British ambassador to the U.S., stated that British intelligence analysis made available to the CIA indicated that the Cuban people were overwhelmingly behind Castro and that there was no likelihood of mass defections or insurrections.

== Initiation ==
=== Fleet sets sail ===
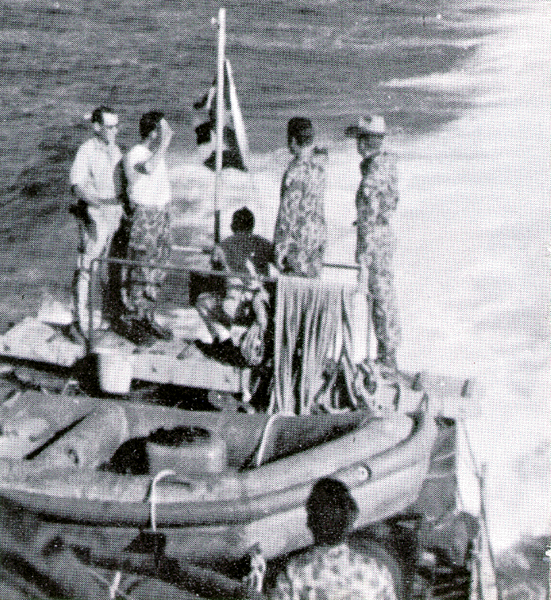
Aboard the invasion flagship Blagar, off the Cuban coast, April 16, 1961, Pepe San Roman (left) and Artime salute the Cuban flag.

Under cover of darkness, the invasion fleet set sail from Puerto Cabezas, Nicaragua and headed toward the Bay of Pigs on the night of 14 April. After on-loading the attack planes in Norfolk Naval Base and taking on prodigious quantities of food and supplies sufficient for the seven weeks at-sea to come, the crew knew from the hasty camouflage of the ship and aircraft identifying numbers that a secret mission was on hand. Combatants were supplied with forged Cuban local currency, in the form of 20 Peso bills, identifiable by the serial numbers F69 and F70. The aircraft carrier group of the USS Essex had been at sea for nearly a month before the invasion; its crew was well aware of the impending battle. En route, Essex had made a night time stop at a Navy arms depot in Charleston, South Carolina, to load tactical nuclear weapons to be held ready during the cruise. The afternoon of the invasion, one accompanying destroyer rendezvoused with Essex to have a gun mount repaired and put back into action; the ship displayed numerous shell casings on deck from its shore bombardment actions. On 16 April Essex was at general quarters for most of a day; Soviet MiG-15s made feints and close range fly overs that night.

=== Air attacks on airfields ===
During the night of 14/15 April, a diversionary landing was planned near Baracoa, Oriente Province, by about 164 Cuban exiles commanded by Higinio 'Nino' Diaz. Their mother ship, named La Playa or Santa Ana, had sailed from Key West under a Costa Rican ensign. Several U.S. Navy destroyers were stationed offshore near Guantánamo Bay to give the appearance of an impending invasion fleet. The reconnaissance boats turned back to the ship after their crews detected activities by Cuban Militia forces along the coastline. As a result of those activities, at daybreak, a reconnaissance sortie over the Baracoa area was launched from Santiago de Cuba by an FAR T-33, piloted by Lt. Orestes Acosta, and it crashed fatally into the sea. On 17 April, his name was falsely quoted as a defector among the disinformation circulating in Miami.

The CIA, with the backing of the Pentagon, had originally requested permission to produce sonic booms over Havana on 14 April to create confusion. The request was a form of psychological warfare that had proven successful in the overthrow of Jacobo Arbenz in Guatemala in 1954. The point was to create confusion in Havana and have it be a distraction to Castro if they could "break all the windows in town." The request was denied, however, since officials thought such would be too obvious a sign of involvement by the United States.

On 15 April 1961, at about 06:00, Cuban local time, eight B-26B Invader bombers in three groups simultaneously attacked three Cuban airfields at San Antonio de los Baños and at Ciudad Libertad (formerly named Campo Columbia), both near Havana, plus the Antonio Maceo International Airport at Santiago de Cuba. The B-26s had been prepared by the CIA on behalf of Brigade 2506 and had been painted with the false flag markings of the FAR. Each came armed with bombs, rockets, and machine guns. They had flown from Puerto Cabezas in Nicaragua and were crewed by exiled Cuban pilots and navigators of the self-styled Fuerza Aérea de Liberación (FAL). The purpose of the action (code-named Operation Puma) was reportedly to destroy most or all of the armed aircraft of the FAR in preparation for the main invasion.

At Santiago, the two attackers destroyed a C-47 transport, a PBY Catalina flying boat, two B-26s, and a civilian Douglas DC-3 plus various other civilian aircraft. At San Antonio, the three attackers destroyed three FAR B-26s, one Sea Fury, and one T-33, and one attacker diverted to Grand Cayman because of low fuel. Aircraft that diverted to the Caymans were seized by the United Kingdom since they were suspicious that the Cayman Islands might be perceived as a launch site for the invasion. At Ciudad Libertad, the three attackers destroyed only non-operational aircraft such as two Republic P-47 Thunderbolts.

One of those attackers was damaged by anti-aircraft fire and ditched about 50 km (31 mi) north of Cuba, with the loss of its crew Daniel Fernández Mon and Gaston Pérez. Its companion B-26, also damaged, continued north and landed at Boca Chica Field, Florida. The crew, José Crespo and Lorenzo Pérez-Lorenzo, were granted political asylum, and made their way back to Nicaragua the next day via Miami and the daily CIA C-54 flight from Opa-Locka Airport to Puerto Cabezas Airport. Their B-26, purposely numbered 933, the same as at least two other B-26s that day for disinformation reasons, was held until late on 17 April.

=== Deception flight ===
About 90 minutes after the eight B-26s had taken off from Puerto Cabezas to attack Cuban airfields, another B-26 departed on a deception flight that took it close to Cuba but headed north toward Florida. Like the bomber groups, it carried false FAR markings and the same number 933 as painted on at least two of the others. Before departure, the cowling from one of the aircraft's two engines was removed by CIA personnel, fired upon, then re-installed to give the false appearance that the aircraft had taken ground fire at some point during its flight. At a safe distance north of Cuba, the pilot feathered the engine with the pre-installed bullet holes in the cowling, radioed a mayday call, and requested immediate permission to land at Miami International airport. He landed and taxied to the military area of the airport near an Air Force C-47 and was met by several government cars. The pilot was Mario Zúñiga, formerly of the FAEC (Cuban Air Force under Batista), and after landing, he masqueraded as 'Juan Garcia' and publicly claimed that three colleagues had also defected from the FAR. The next day he was granted political asylum, and that night he returned to Puerto Cabezas via Opa-Locka. This deception operation was successful at the time in convincing much of the world media that the attacks on the FAR bases were the work of an internal anti-Communist faction and did not involve outside actors.

=== Reactions ===
At 10:30 on 15 April at the United Nations (UN), Cuban Foreign Minister Raúl Roa accused the U.S. of aggressive air attacks against Cuba and that afternoon formally tabled a motion to the Political (First) Committee of the UN General Assembly. Only days earlier, the CIA had unsuccessfully attempted to entice Raúl Roa into defecting. In response to Roa's accusations before the UN, United States Ambassador to the United Nations Adlai Stevenson stated that U.S. armed forces would not "under any conditions" intervene in Cuba and that the U.S. would do everything in its power to ensure that no U.S. citizens would participate in actions against Cuba. He also stated that Cuban defectors had carried out the attacks that day, and he presented a UPI wire photo of Zúñiga's B-26 in Cuban markings at Miami airport. Stevenson was later embarrassed to realize that the CIA had lied to him.

Kennedy supported the statement made by Stevenson: "I have emphasized before that this was a struggle of Cuban patriots against a Cuban dictator. While we could not be expected to hide our sympathies, we made it repeatedly clear that the armed forces of this country would not intervene in any way".

On 15 April, the Cuban national police, led by Efigenio Ameijeiras, started the process of arresting thousands of suspected anti-revolutionary individuals and detaining them in provisional locations such as the Karl Marx Theatre, the moat of La Cabaña and the Principe Castle, all in Havana, and the baseball park in Matanzas. In total, between 20,000 and 100,000 people would be arrested.

=== Operation Mars ===
The "Special Battalion" of Brigade 2506, consisting of 160 guerrilla warfighters under the command of Higinio Nino Diaz Ane, was tasked with carrying out "Operation Mars". Operation Mars was a separate mission from Operation Pluto and unknown to JFK that was organized by the former Vice President Richard Nixon and CIA Director George Bush alongside their Cuban exile counterparts. The intention of Mars was to land at the beach (playa) near Baracoa to provide a feint attack for the primary landing force at Giron. Men of the Special Battalion trained separately from the men of Operation Pluto, at Camp Beauregard.

On the night of 15/16 April, the Nino Diaz group failed in a second attempted diversionary landing at a different location near Baracoa. On 16 April, Merardo Leon, Jose Leon, and 14 others staged an armed uprising at Las Delicias Estate in Las Villas, with only four surviving.

Following the airstrikes on the Cuban airfields on 15 April, the FAR prepared for action with its surviving aircraft which numbered at least four T-33 jet trainers, four Sea Fury fighters, and five or six B-26 medium bombers. The T-33s and B-26s were armed with machine guns and the Sea Furies with 20 mm cannon for air-to-air combat and strafing ships and ground targets. CIA planners had failed to discover that the U.S.-supplied T-33 trainer jets had long been armed with M3 machine guns. The three types could also carry bombs and rocket pods for attacks against ships and tanks.

No additional airstrikes against Cuban airfields and aircraft were specifically planned before 17 April, because B-26 pilots' exaggerated claims gave the CIA false confidence in the success of 15 April attacks, until U-2 reconnaissance photos taken on 16 April showed otherwise. Late on 16 April, President Kennedy ordered the cancellation of further airfield strikes planned for dawn on 17 April, to attempt plausible deniability of direct U.S. involvement.

Late on 16 April, the CIA/Brigade 2506 invasion fleet converged on 'Rendezvous Point Zulu', about 65 kilometres (40 mi) south of Cuba, having sailed from Puerto Cabezas in Nicaragua where they had been loaded with troops and other materiel, after loading arms and supplies at New Orleans. The U.S. Navy operation was code-named Bumpy Road, having been changed from Crosspatch. The fleet, labeled the 'Cuban Expeditionary Force' (CEF), included five 2,400-ton (empty weight) freighter ships chartered by the CIA from the Garcia Line, and subsequently outfitted with anti-aircraft guns. Four of the freighters, Houston (code name Aguja), Río Escondido (code name Ballena), Caribe (code name Sardina), and Atlántico (code-name Tiburón), were planned to transport about 1,400 troops in seven battalions and armaments near to the invasion beaches. The fifth freighter, Lake Charles, was loaded with follow-up supplies and some Operation 40 infiltration personnel.

The freighters sailed under Liberian ensigns. Accompanying them were two LCIs outfitted with heavy armament at Key West. The LCIs were Blagar (code-name Marsopa) and Barbara J (code-name Barracuda), sailing under Nicaraguan ensigns. After exercises and training at Vieques Island, the CEF ships were individually escorted (outside visual range) to Point Zulu by U.S. Navy destroyers USS Bache, USS Beale, USS Conway, USS Cony, USS Eaton, USS Murray, and USS Waller. US Navy Task Group 81.8 had already assembled off the Cayman Islands, commanded by Rear Admiral John E. Clark onboard aircraft carrier USS Essex, plus helicopter assault carrier USS Boxer, destroyers USS Hank, USS John W. Weeks, USS Purdy, USS Wren, and submarines USS Cobbler and USS Threadfin.

Command and control ship USS Northampton and carrier USS Shangri-La were also reportedly active in the Caribbean at the time. USS San Marcos was a Landing Ship Dock that carried three Landing Craft Utility (LCUs) which could accommodate the Brigade's M41 tanks and four Landing Craft, Vehicles, Personnel (LCVPs). San Marcos had sailed from Vieques Island. At Point Zulu, the seven CEF ships sailed north without the USN escorts, except for San Marcos that continued until the seven landing craft were unloaded when just outside the 5 kilometres (3 mi) Cuban territorial limit.

== Invasion ==
=== Invasion day 17 April ===
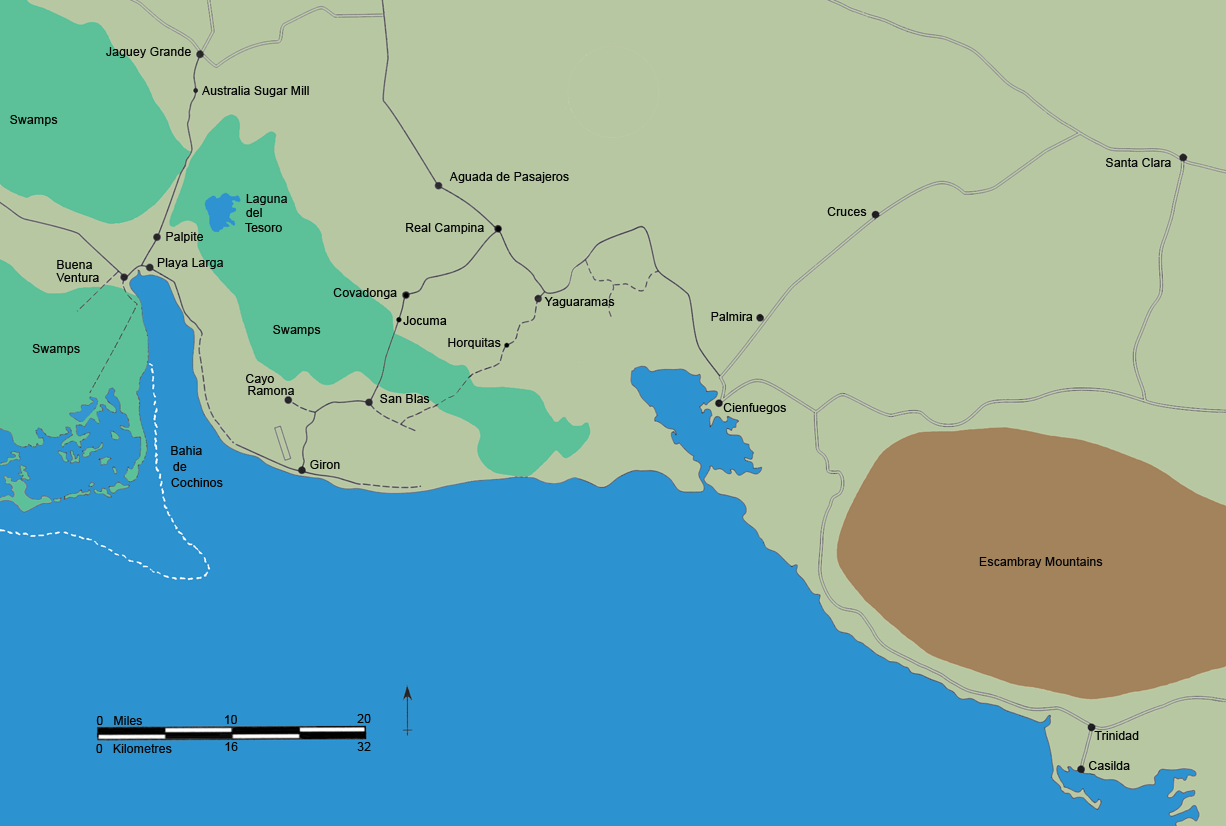
Bahia de Cochinos 1961

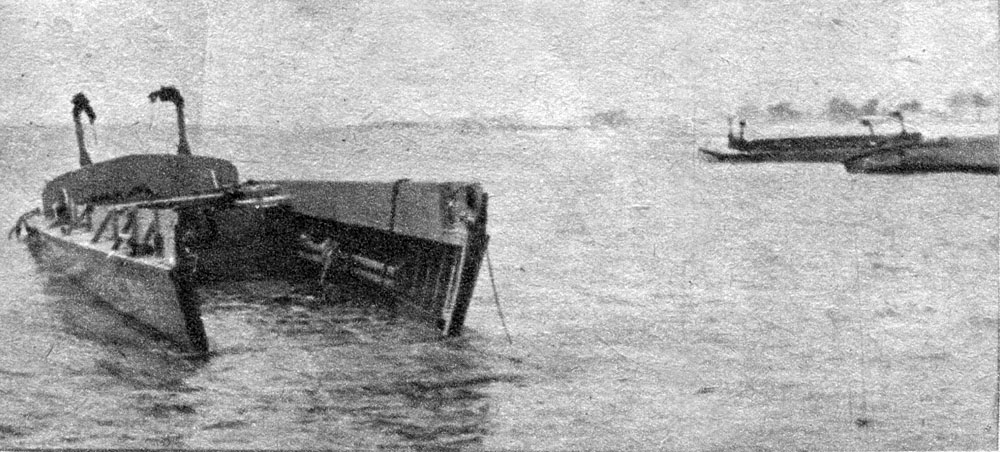
Brigade 2506 landing craft at the Bay of Pigs

During the night of 16/17 April, a mock diversionary landing was organized by CIA operatives near Bahía Honda, Pinar del Río Province. A flotilla containing equipment that broadcast sounds and other effects of a shipborne invasion landing provided the source of Cuban reports that briefly lured Fidel Castro away from the Bay of Pigs battlefront area.

At midnight on 17 April 1961, the two LCIs Blagar and Barbara J, each with a CIA 'operations officer' and an Underwater Demolition Team of five frogmen, entered the Bay of Pigs. They headed a force of four transport ships (Houston, Río Escondido, Caribe, and Atlántico) carrying about 1,400 Cuban exile ground troops of Brigade 2506, plus the brigade's M41 tanks and other vehicles in the landing craft. At about 01:00, Blagar, as the battlefield command ship, directed the principal landing at Playa Girón (code-named Blue Beach), led by the frogmen in rubber boats followed by troops from Caribe in small aluminum boats, then the LCVPs and LCUs with the M41 tanks. Barbara J, leading Houston, similarly landed troops 35 km further northwest at Playa Larga (code-named Red Beach), using small fiberglass boats.

The unloading of troops at night was delayed because of engine failures and boats damaged by unseen coral reefs; the CIA had originally believed that the coral reef was seaweed. As the frogmen came in, they were shocked to discover that Red Beach was lit with floodlights, which led to the location of the landing being hastily changed. As the frogmen landed, a firefight broke out when a Jeep carrying Cuban Militia happened by. The few militias in the area succeeded in warning Cuban Armed Forces via radio soon after the first landing, before the invaders overcame their token resistance. Castro was awakened at about 03:15 to be informed of the landings, which led him to put all militia units in the area on the highest state of alert and to order airstrikes. The Cuban regime planned to strike the brigadistas at Playa Larga first as they were inland before turning on the brigadistas at Girón at sea. Castro departed personally to lead his forces into battle against the brigadistas.

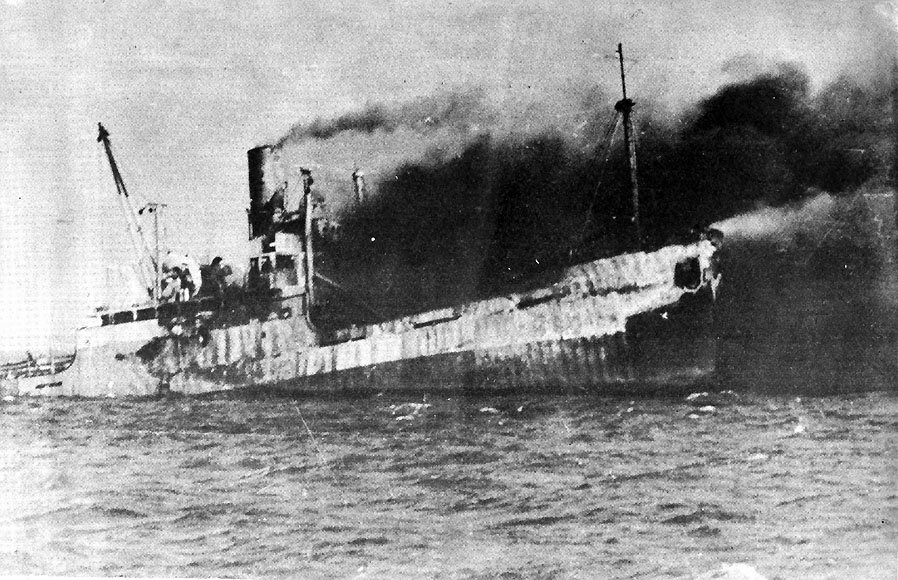
The Houston after bomb damage

At daybreak around 06:30, three FAR Sea Furies, one B-26 bomber and two T-33s started attacking those CEF ships still unloading troops. At about 06:50, south of Playa Larga, Houston was damaged by several bombs and rockets from a Sea Fury and a T-33, and about two hours later Captain Luis Morse intentionally beached it on the western side of the bay. About 270 troops had been unloaded, but about 180 survivors who struggled ashore were incapable of taking part in further action because of the loss of most of their weapons and equipment. The loss of Houston was a great blow to the brigadistas as that ship was carrying much of the medical supplies, which meant that wounded brigadistas had to make do with inadequate medical care. At about 07:00, two FAL B-26s attacked and sank the Cuban Navy patrol escort ship El Baire at Nueva Gerona on the Isle of Pines. They then proceeded to Girón to join two other B-26s to attack Cuban ground troops and provide distraction air cover for the paratroop C-46s and the CEF ships under air attack. The M41 tanks had all landed by 07:30 at Blue Beach and all of the troops by 08:30. Neither San Román at Blue Beach nor Erneido Oliva at Red Beach could communicate as all of the radios had been soaked in the water during the landings.

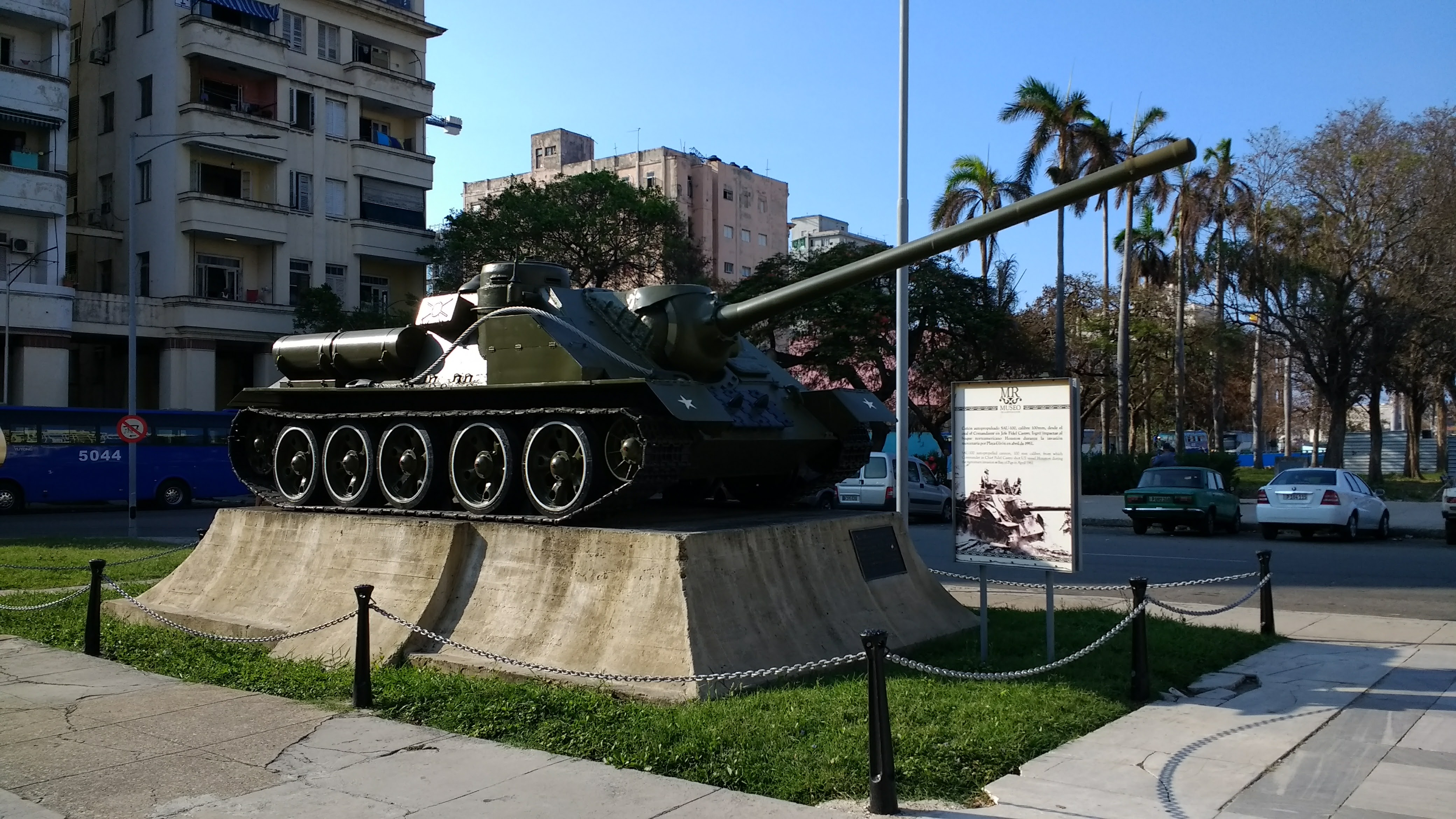
The SU-100 from which Fidel Castro reportedly shelled the freighter Houston during the morning of 17 April

At about 07:30, five C-46 and one C-54 transport aircraft dropped 177 paratroops from the parachute battalion in an action code-named Operation Falcon. About 30 men, plus heavy equipment, were dropped south of the Central Australia sugar mill on the road to Palpite and Playa Larga, but the equipment was lost in the swamps, and the troops failed to block the road. Other troops were dropped at San Blas, at Jocuma between Covadonga and San Blas, and at Horquitas between Yaguaramas and San Blas. Those positions to block the roads were maintained for two days, reinforced by ground troops from Playa Girón and tanks. The paratroopers had landed amid a collection of militia, but their training allowed them to hold their own against the ill-trained militiamen. However, the dispersal of the paratroopers as they landed meant they were unable to take the road from the sugar mill down to Playa Larga, which allowed the government to continue to send troops down to resist the invasion.

At about 08:30, a FAR Sea Fury piloted by Carlos Ulloa Arauz crashed in the bay after encountering a FAL C-46 returning south after dropping paratroops. By 09:00, Cuban troops and militia from outside the area had started arriving at the sugar mill, Covadonga and Yaguaramas. Throughout the day they were reinforced by more troops, heavy armour, and T-34-85 tanks typically carried on flat-bed trucks. At about 09:30, FAR Sea Furies and T-33s fired rockets at Río Escondido, which then sank about 3 kilometres (1.9 mi) south of Girón. Río Escondido was loaded with aviation fuel, and as the ship started to burn, the captain gave the order to abandon ship with the ship being destroyed in three explosions shortly afterward. Río Escondido carried fuel along with enough ammunition, food, and medical supplies to last ten days and the radio that allowed the brigade to communicate with the FAL. The loss of the Río Escondido meant that San Román was only able to issue orders to the forces at Blue Beach, and he had no idea of what was happening at Red Beach or with the paratroopers. A messenger from Red Beach arrived at about 10:00 asking San Román to send tank and infantry to block the road from the sugar mill, a request that he agreed to. It was not expected that government forces would be counter-attacking from this direction.

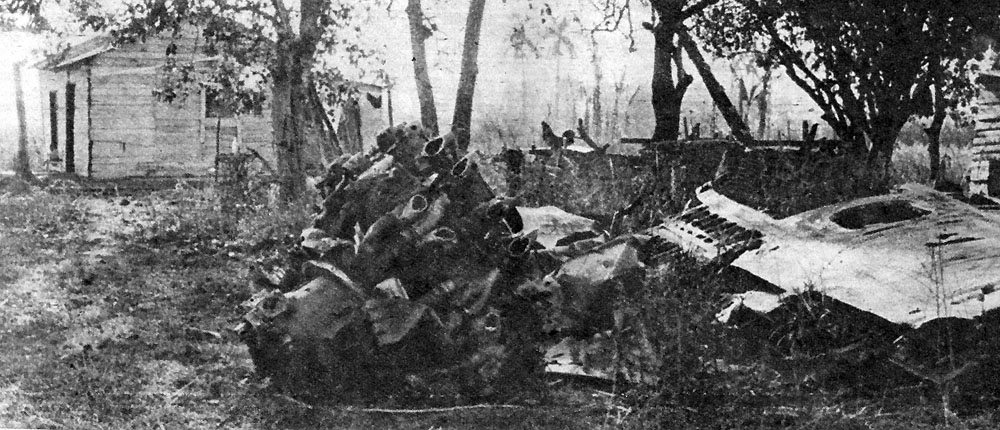
Brigade 2506 plane shot down over Australia, Cuba

At about 11:00, Castro issued a statement over Cuba's nationwide network saying that the invaders, members of the exiled Cuban revolutionary front, have come to destroy the revolution and take away the dignity and rights of men. At about 11:00, a FAR T-33 attacked and shot down a FAL B-26 (serial number 935) piloted by Matias Farias, who then survived a crash landing on the Girón Airfield, his navigator Eduardo González already killed by gunfire. His companion B-26 suffered damage and diverted to Grand Cayman Island. By about 11:00, the two remaining freighters Caribe and Atlántico, and the LCIs and LCUs, started retreating south to international waters, but were still pursued by FAR aircraft. At about noon, a FAR B-26 exploded from heavy anti-aircraft fire from Blagar, and pilot Luis Silva Tablada (on his second sortie) and his crew of three were lost.

By noon, hundreds of Cuban militia cadets from Matanzas had secured Palpite and cautiously advanced on foot south toward Playa Larga, suffering many casualties during attacks by FAL B-26s. By dusk, other Cuban ground forces gradually advanced southward from Covadonga, southwest from Yaguaramas toward San Blas, and westward along coastal tracks from Cienfuegos toward Girón all without heavy weapons or armour. At 14:30 a group of militiamen from the 339th Battalion set up a position, which came under attack from the brigadista M41 tanks, which inflicted heavy losses on the defenders. This action is remembered in Cuba as the "Slaughter of the Lost Battalion" as most of the militiamen perished.

Three FAL B-26s were shot down by FAR T-33s, with the loss of pilots Raúl Vianello, José Crespo, and Osvaldo Piedra and navigators Lorenzo Pérez-Lorenzo and José Fernández. Vianello's navigator Demetrio Pérez bailed out and was picked up by USS Murray. Pilot Crispín García Fernández and navigator Juan González Romero, in B-26 serial 940, diverted to Boca Chica, but late that night they attempted to fly back to Puerto Cabezas in B-26 serial 933 that Crespo had flown to Boca Chica on 15 April. In October 1961, the remains of the B-26 and its two crew were found in the dense jungle in Nicaragua. One FAL B-26 diverted to Grand Cayman with engine failure. By 04:00, Castro had arrived at the Central Australia sugar mill, joining José Ramón Fernández whom he had appointed as battlefield commander before dawn that day.

At about 05:00, a night air strike by three FAL B-26s on San Antonio de Los Baños airfield failed, reportedly because of incompetence and bad weather. Two other B-26s had aborted the mission after take-off. Other sources allege that heavy anti-aircraft fire scared the aircrews. As night fell, Atlántico and Caribe pulled away from Cuba to be followed by Blagar and Barbara J. The ships were to return to the Bay of Pigs the following day to unload more ammunition, however the captains of the Atlántico and Caribe decided to abandon the invasion and head out to open sea fearing further air attacks by the FAR. Destroyers from the U.S. Navy intercepted Atlántico about 110 miles (180 km) south of Cuba and persuaded the captain to return, but Caribe was not intercepted until she was 218 miles (351 km) away from Cuba, and she was not to return until it was too late.

=== Invasion day plus one (D+1) 18 April ===
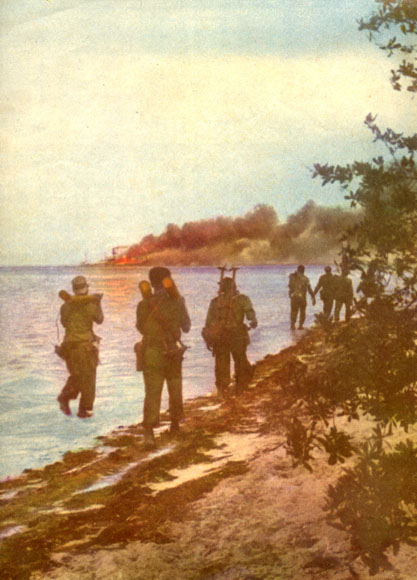
Cuban soldiers at Playa Larga. The supply ship Houston is seen burning in the distance

During the night of 17–18 April, the force at Red Beach came under repeated counter-attacks from the Cuban Army and militia. As casualties mounted and ammunition was used up, the brigadistas steadily gave way. Airdrops from four C-54s and 2 C-46s had only limited success in landing more ammunition. Both the Blagar and Barbara J returned at midnight to land more ammunition, which proved insufficient for the brigadistas. Following desperate appeals for help from Oliva, San Román ordered all of his M41 tanks to assist in the defense. During the night fighting, a tank battle broke out when the brigadista M41 tanks clashed with the T-34-85 tanks of the Cuban Army. This sharp action forced back the brigadistas.

At 22:00, the Cuban Army opened fire with its 76.2 mm and 122 mm artillery guns on the brigadista forces at Playa Larga, which was followed by an attack by T-34 tanks at about midnight. The 2,000 artillery rounds fired by the Cuban Army had mostly missed the brigadista defense positions, and the T-34-85 tanks rode into an ambush when they came under fire from the brigadista M41 tanks and mortar fire, and a number of T-34-85 tanks were destroyed or knocked out. At 01:00, Cuban Army infantrymen and militiamen started an offensive. Despite heavy losses on the part of the Cuban forces, the shortage of ammunition forced the brigadistas back and the T-34-85 tanks continued to force their way past the wreckage of the battlefield to press on the assault. The Cuban forces in the assault numbered about 2,100 men, consisting of about 300 FAR soldiers, 1,600 militiamen, and 200 local policemen supported by at least 20 T-34-85 tanks who were faced by 370 brigadistas.

By 05:00, Oliva started to order his men to retreat as he had almost no ammunition or mortar rounds left. By about 10:30, Cuban troops and militia, supported by the T-34-85 tanks and 122 mm artillery, took Playa Larga after Brigade forces had fled toward Girón in the early hours. During the day, Brigade forces retreated to San Blas along the two roads from Covadonga and Yaguaramas. By then, both Castro and Fernández had relocated to that battlefront area.

As the men from Red Beach arrived at Girón, San Román and Oliva met to discuss the situation. With ammunition running low, Oliva suggested that the brigade retreat into the Escambray Mountains to wage guerilla warfare, but San Román decided to hold the beachhead. At about 11:00, the Cuban Army began an offensive to take San Blas. San Román ordered all of the paratroopers back in order to hold San Blas, and they halted the offensive. During the afternoon, Castro kept the brigadistas under steady air attack and artillery fire but did not order any new major attacks.

At 14:00, Kennedy received a telegram from Nikita Khrushchev in Moscow, stating the Soviets would not allow the U.S. to enter Cuba and implied swift nuclear retribution to the United States heartland if their warnings were not heeded.

At about 17:00, FAL B-26s attacked a Cuban column of 12 private buses leading trucks carrying tanks and other armor, moving southeast between Playa Larga and Punta Perdiz. The vehicles, loaded with civilians, militia, police, and soldiers, were attacked with bombs, napalm, and rockets, suffering heavy casualties. The six attacking FAL B-26s were piloted by two CIA contract pilots plus four pilots and six navigators from the FAL. The column later re-formed and advanced to Punta Perdiz, about 11 km northwest of Girón.

=== Invasion day plus two (D+2) 19 April ===
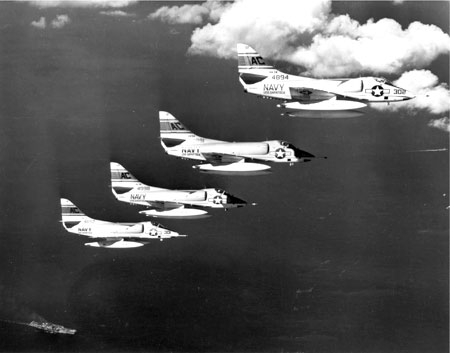
Douglas A-4 Skyhawks from the USS Essex purportedly flying sorties over combat areas during the invasion – these aircraft show nationality markings, which sources say were removed for such sorties.

During the night of 18 April, a FAL C-46 delivered arms and equipment to the Girón airstrip occupied by brigade ground forces and took off before daybreak on 19 April. The C-46 also evacuated Matias Farias, the pilot of B-26 serial '935' (code-named Chico Two) that had been shot down and crash-landed at Girón on 17 April. The crews of the Barbara J and Blagar had done their best to land what ammunition they had left onto the beachhead, but without air support the captains of both ships reported that it was too dangerous to be operating off the Cuban coast by day.

The final air attack mission (code-named Mad Dog Flight) comprised five B-26s, four of which were manned by American CIA contract aircrews and volunteer pilots from the Alabama Air National Guard. One FAR Sea Fury (piloted by Douglas Rudd) and two FAR T-33s (piloted by Rafael del Pino and Alvaro Prendes) shot down two of these B-26s, killing four American airmen. Combat air patrols were flown by Douglas A4D-2N Skyhawk jets of VA-34 squadron operating from the aircraft carrier USS Essex, with nationality and other markings removed. Sorties were flown to reassure brigade soldiers and pilots and to intimidate Cuban government forces without directly engaging in combat.

At 10:00, a tank battle broke out, with the brigadista holding their line until about 14:00, which led Oliva to order a retreat into Girón. After the last air attacks, San Román ordered his paratroopers and the men of the 3rd Battalion to launch a surprise attack, which was initially successful but soon failed. With the brigadistas in disorganized retreat, the Cuban Army and militiamen started to advance rapidly, taking San Blas only to be stopped outside of Girón at about 11:00. Later that afternoon, San Román heard the rumbling of the advancing T-34-85s and reported that with no more mortar rounds or bazooka rounds, he could not stop the tanks and ordered his men to fall back to the beach. Oliva arrived afterward to find that the brigadistas were all heading out to the beach or retreating into the jungle or swamps. Without direct air support, and short of ammunition, Brigade 2506 ground forces retreated to the beaches in the face of the onslaught from Cuban government artillery, tanks, and infantry.

Late on 19 April, destroyers USS Eaton (code-named Santiago) and USS Murray (code-named Tampico) moved into Cochinos Bay to evacuate retreating Brigade soldiers from beaches, before fire from Cuban Army tanks caused Commodore Crutchfield to order a withdrawal.

=== Invasion day plus three (D+3) 20 April ===
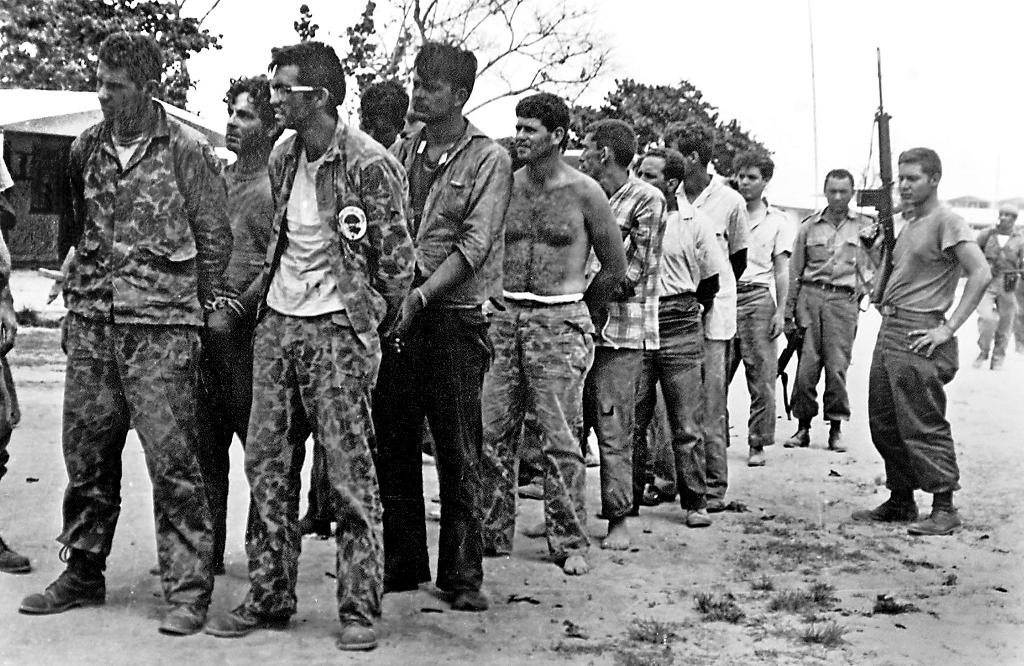
Invaders surrender to Cuban soldiers. (April 20, 1961)

From 19 April until about 22 April, sorties were flown by A4D-2Ns to obtain visual intelligence over combat areas. Reconnaissance flights are also reported of AD-5Ws of VFP-62 and/or VAW-12 squadron from USS Essex or another carrier, such as USS Shangri-La that was part of the task force assembled off the Cayman Islands.

On 21 April, Eaton and Murray, joined on 22 April by destroyers USS Conway and USS Cony, plus submarine USS Threadfin and a CIA PBY-5A Catalina flying boat, continued to search the coastline, reefs, and islands for scattered Brigade survivors, about 24–30 being rescued.

== Aftermath ==
=== Casualties ===
Sixty-seven Cuban exiles from Brigade 2506 were killed in action. Additionally, 10 more were executed by firing squad; 10 lost their lives on the boat Celia trying to escape; nine died in a sealed truck container on the way to Havana; four died by accident; two in prison; and four American aviators also died, for a total of 106 deaths. Aircrews killed in action totaled 6 from the Cuban air force, 10 Cuban exiles, and 4 American airmen. Paratrooper Eugene Herman Koch was killed in action, and the American airmen shot down were Thomas W. Ray, Leo F. Baker, Riley W. Shamburger, and Wade C. Gray. In 1979, the body of Thomas "Pete" Ray was repatriated from Cuba. In the 1990s, the CIA admitted he was linked to the agency and awarded him the Distinguished Intelligence Cross.

The final toll for Cuban armed forces during the conflict was 176 killed in action. (Note: 1,500 ground forces (including 177 paratroops) – c. 1,300 landed. Also Cuban exile and American aircrews, as well as CIA operatives) This figure includes only the Cuban Army and it is estimated that about 2,000 militiamen were killed or wounded during the fighting. Other Cuban forces casualties were between 500 and 4,000 (killed, wounded or missing). The airfield attacks on 15 April left 7 Cubans dead and 53 wounded.

In 2011, the National Security Archive, under the Freedom of Information Act, obtained over 1,200 pages of released documents. Included within these documents were descriptions of incidents of friendly fire. The CIA had outfitted some B-26 bombers to appear as Cuban aircraft, having ordered them to remain inland to avoid being fired upon by American-backed forces. Some of the planes, not heeding the warning, came under fire. According to CIA operative Grayston Lynch, "we couldn't tell them from the Castro planes. We ended up shooting at two or three of them. We hit some of them there because when they came at us... it was a silhouette, that was all you could see."

=== Prisoners ===
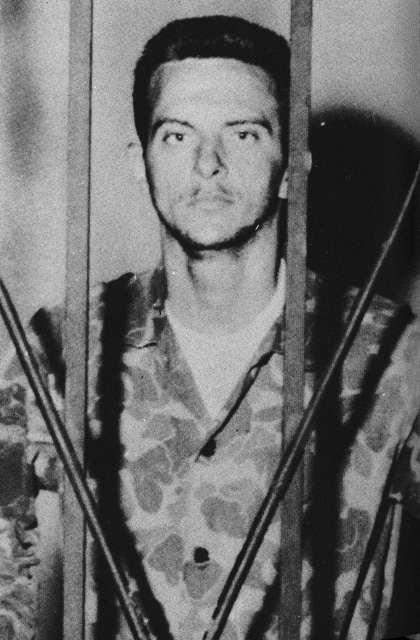
Pepe San Román: a commander in Brigade 2506, inside a Cuban prison

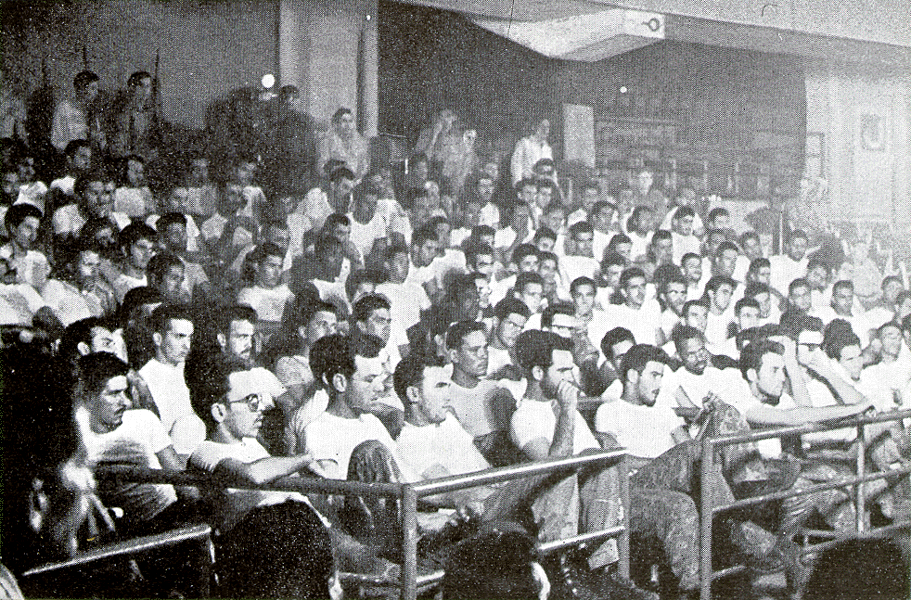
Brigade 2506 prisoners on trial at Havana sports palace

Havana gleefully noted the wealth of the captured invaders: 100 plantation owners, 67 landlords of apartment houses, 35 factory owners, 112 businessmen, 179 lived off unearned income, and 194 ex-soldiers of Batista.

— Life (magazine)

On 19 April, at least seven Cubans plus two CIA-hired U.S. citizens (Angus K. McNair and Howard F. Anderson) were executed in Pinar del Río province, after a two-day trial. On 20 April, Humberto Sorí Marin was executed at La Cabaña, having been arrested on 18 March following infiltration into Cuba with 14 tons of explosives. His fellow conspirators Rogelio González Corzo (alias "Francisco Gutierrez"), Rafael Diaz Hanscom, Eufemio Fernandez, Arturo Hernandez Tellaheche, and Manuel Lorenzo Puig Miyar were also executed.

Between April and October 1961, hundreds of executions took place in response to the invasion. They took place at various prisons, including the Fortaleza de la Cabaña and Morro Castle. Infiltration team leaders Antonio Diaz Pou and Raimundo E. Lopez, as well as underground students Virgilio Campaneria, Alberto Tapia Ruano, and more than one hundred other brigadistas were executed.

About 1,202 members of Brigade 2506 were captured, of whom nine died from asphyxiation during their transfer to Havana in an airtight truck container. In May 1961, Castro proposed to exchange the surviving brigade prisoners for 500 large farm tractors, later changed to US$28,000,000. On June 8, the Tractors-for-Freedom Committee (a private non-governmental organization formed in response to Castro's proposal) replied by saying it would send farm experts to Cuba to discuss the size and type of tractors. They again asked for the names of the 1,214 prisoners and suggested that the International Red Cross help arrange their release. The committee did not respond to Castro's request for compensation or a prisoner swap. On 8 September 1961, 14 Brigade prisoners were convicted of torture, murder, and other major crimes committed in Cuba before the invasion. Five were executed and nine others imprisoned for 30 years.

Three confirmed as executed were Ramon Calvino, Emilio Soler Puig ("El Muerte"), and Jorge King Yun ("El Chino"). On 29 March 1962, 1,179 men were put on trial for treason. On 7 April 1962, all were convicted and sentenced to 30 years in prison. On 14 April 1962, 60 wounded and sick prisoners were freed and transported to the U.S. In 2021, it was discovered that Brazil's government, then led by President João Goulart, intervened on behalf of the United States to avoid the death penalty for prisoners.

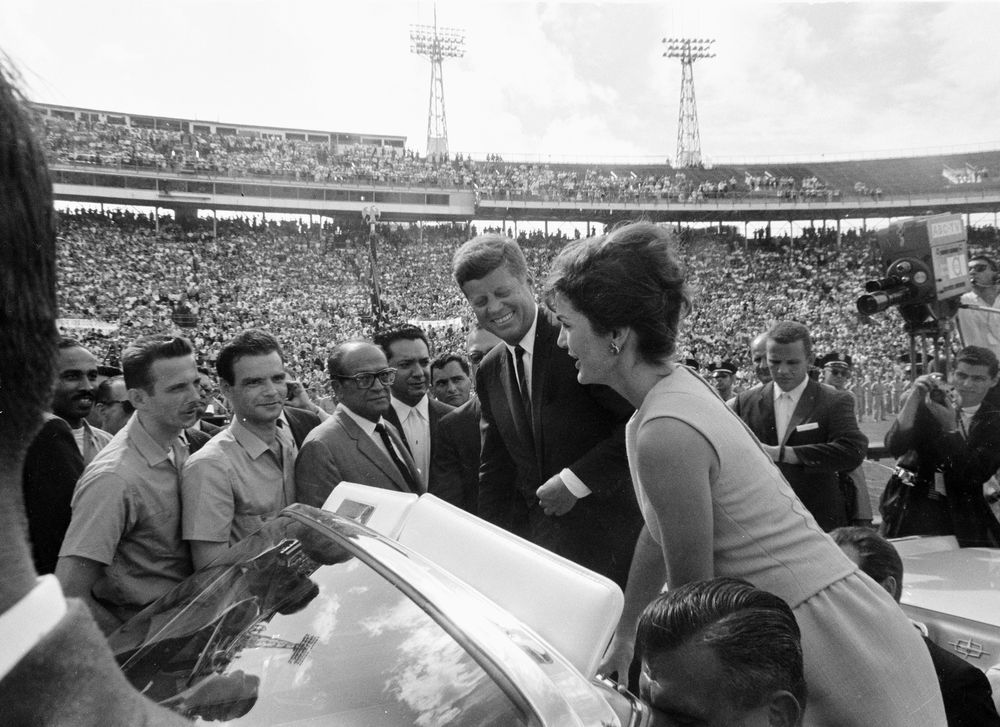
President John F. Kennedy and First Lady Jacqueline Kennedy greeting 2506 Brigade members, 1962

On 21 December 1962, Castro and James B. Donovan, a U.S. lawyer aided by Milan C. Miskovsky, a CIA legal officer, signed an agreement to exchange 1,113 prisoners for US$53 million in food and medicine, sourced from private donations and from companies expecting tax concessions. On 24 December 1962, some prisoners were flown to Miami, others following on the ship African Pilot, plus about 1,000 family members also allowed to leave Cuba. On 29 December 1962, President Kennedy and his wife Jacqueline attended a "welcome back" ceremony for Brigade 2506 veterans at the Orange Bowl in Miami, Florida.

=== Public statements ===
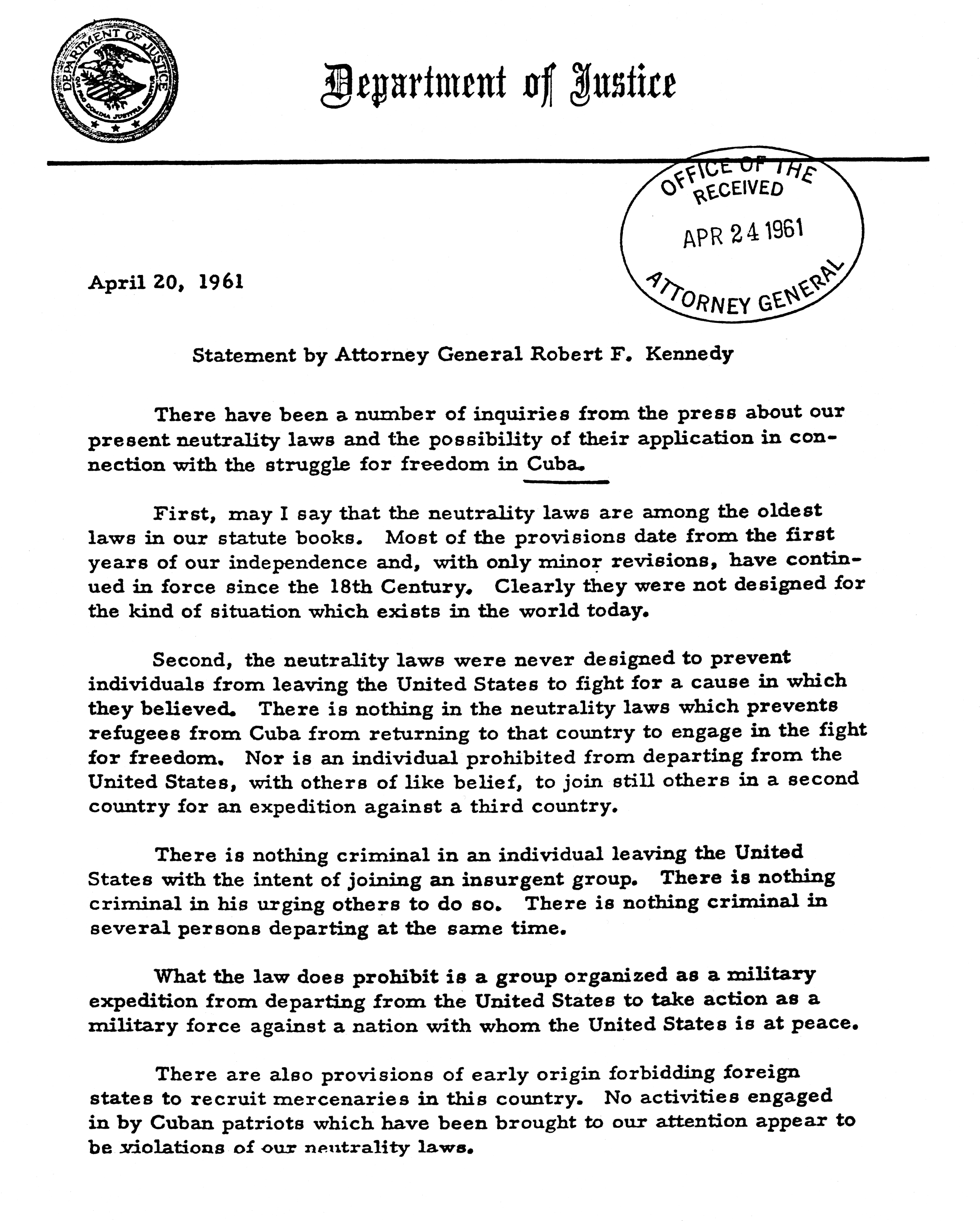
Robert F. Kennedy's Statement on Cuba and Neutrality Laws, 20 April 1961

The failed invasion severely embarrassed the Kennedy administration and made Castro wary of future U.S. intervention in Cuba. On 21 April, in a State Department press conference, Kennedy said: "There's an old saying that victory has a hundred fathers and defeat is an orphan... Further statements, detailed discussions, are not to conceal responsibility because I'm the responsible officer of the Government..." The invasion's failure initiated Operation Mongoose to destabilize Cuba.

Later, Kennedy told Khrushchev that the Bay of Pigs invasion was a mistake.

The initial U.S. response concerning the first air attacks was of a dismissive quality. Adlai Stevenson denied any involvement in the first wave of airstrikes, stating before the UN, "These charges are totally false and I deny them categorically." Stevenson continued to promote a story of two Cuban planes that had reportedly defected to the United States, apparently unaware that they were in fact U.S. planes piloted by U.S.-backed Cuban pilots to promote a false story of defection.

In August 1961, during an economic conference of the OAS in Punta del Este, Uruguay, Che Guevara sent a note to Kennedy via Richard N. Goodwin, a secretary of the White House. It read: "Thanks for Playa Girón. Before the invasion, the revolution was weak. Now it's stronger than ever". Additionally, Guevara answered a set of questions from Leo Huberman of Monthly Review following the invasion. In one reply, Guevara was asked to explain the growing number of Cuban counter-revolutionaries and defectors from the regime, to which he replied that the repelled invasion was the climax of counter-revolution and that afterward such actions "fell drastically to zero." Regarding the defections of some prominent figures within the Cuban government, Guevara remarked that this was because "the socialist revolution left the opportunists, the ambitious, and the fearful far behind and now advances toward a new regime free of this class of vermin."

=== Kennedy's response ===
Allen Dulles later stated, CIA planners believed that once the troops were on the ground, Kennedy would authorize any action required to prevent failure – as Eisenhower had done in Guatemala in 1954 after that invasion looked as if it would collapse. Two of Kennedy's advisors, David Powers and Kenneth O'Donnell, record in their joint memoir that Kennedy believed the only reason the Joint Chiefs of Staff would approve the plan was because "They were sure I'd give in to them and send the go-ahead order to the Essex, they couldn't believe that a new President like me wouldn't panic and try and save his own face. Well, they had me figured all wrong". Kennedy was deeply depressed and angered with the failure. He confided to Arthur Schlesinger Jr. that "I have learned one thing from this business—that is, that we have to deal with CIA... no one has dealt with CIA". Schlesinger writes that the failure of the invasion "stimulated a wide variety of proposals for the reorganization of the CIA" within the Kennedy administration.

Several years after his assassination, The New York Times reported that Kennedy told an unspecified high administration official of wanting "to splinter the CIA in a thousand pieces and scatter it to the winds." However, following a "rigorous inquiry into the agency's affairs, methods, and problems... [Kennedy] did not 'splinter' it after all and did not recommend Congressional supervision." Although Kennedy did issue two National Security Action Memoranda (no. 55 and 57) in the aftermath of the invasion which redefined the CIA role. Memorandum 55 stated that it was the Joint Chiefs of Staff who had the "responsibility for the defense of the nation in the Cold War" and memorandum 57 restricted the CIA's paramilitary operations by stating "Any large paramilitary operation wholly or partly covert which requires significant numbers of militarily trained personnel, amounts of military equipment which exceed normal CIA-controlled stocks and/or military experience of a kind and level peculiar to the Armed Services is properly the primary responsibility of the Department of Defense with the CIA in a supporting role". In October 1961 Kennedy created the Defense Intelligence Agency, the purpose of which was to institutionalize the revoking of the CIA's paramilitary and other duties, and their transfer to the Department of Defense. He also forced the resignations of the three highest ranking CIA men, Allen Dulles (Director), Charles Cabell (deputy director), and Richard M. Bissell Jr. (deputy director for Plans).

Kennedy's confidence in his Joint Chiefs of Staff had been shaken following the failure of the Bay of Pigs invasion. Upon receiving cables from chairman Lyman Lemnitzer he remarked to Arthur Schlesinger that "If it hadn't been for the Bay of Pigs, I might have been impressed by this". Kennedy commented to his journalist friend Ben Bradlee, "The first advice I'm going to give my successor is to watch the generals and to avoid feeling that because they were military men their opinions on military matters were worth a damn."

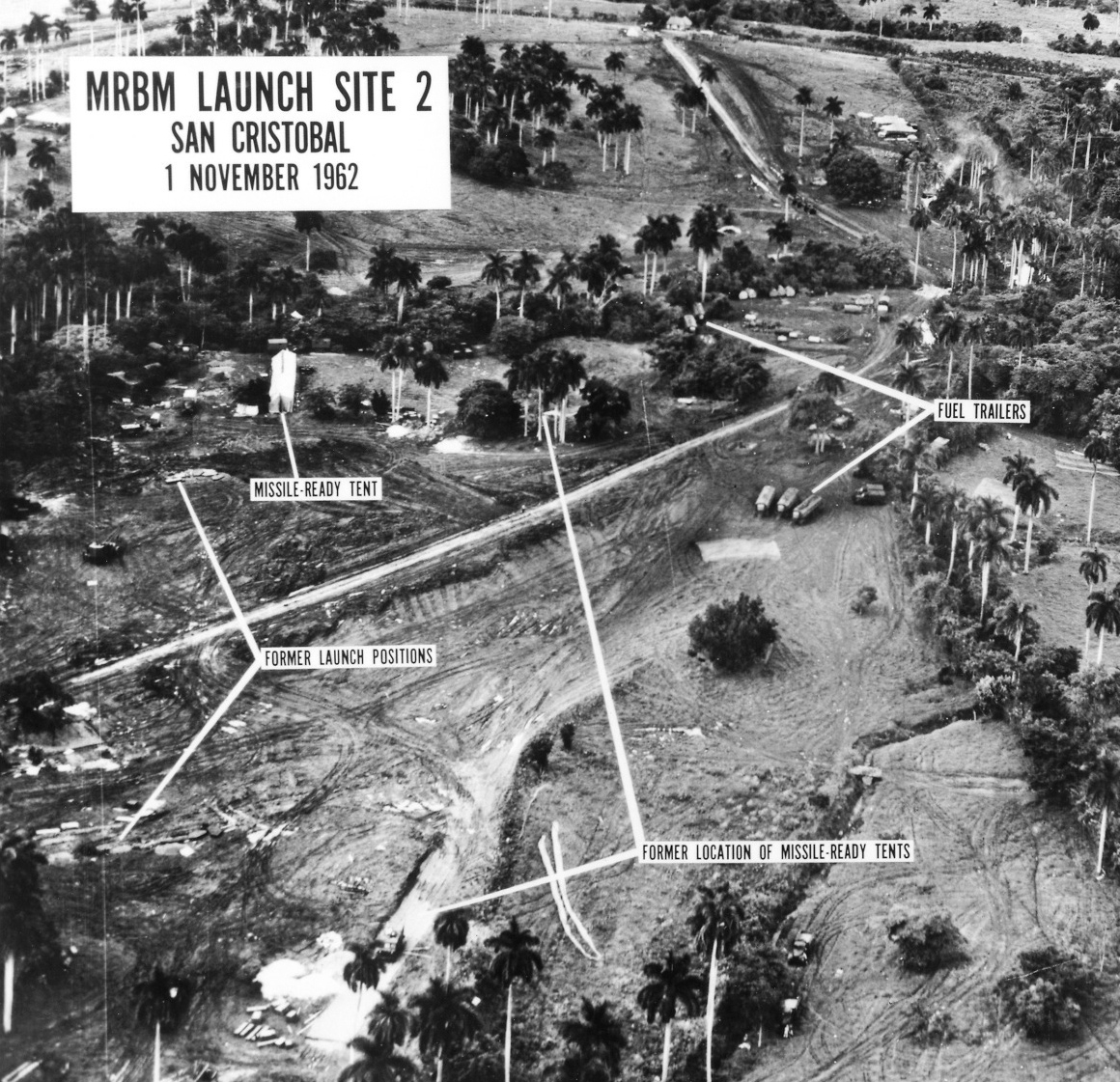
Aerial view of missile launch site at San Cristobal, Cuba

The aftermath of the Bay of Pigs invasion and events involving Cuba that followed caused the U.S. to feel threatened by its neighbor. Prior to the events at Playa Girón, the U.S. government imposed sanctions that limited trade with Cuba. An article appearing in The New York Times dated 6 January 1960 called trade with Cuba "too risky." About six months later in July 1960, the U.S. reduced the import quota of Cuban sugar, leaving the U.S. no choice but to maintain its sugar needs from other sources. Immediately following the Bay of Pigs invasion, the Kennedy administration considered a complete embargo. Five months later, the president was authorized to do so.

According to author Jim Rasenberger, the Kennedy administration became very aggressive with regard to overthrowing Castro following the failure of the Bay of Pigs Invasion, reportedly doubling its efforts. Rasenberger elaborated on the fact that almost every decision that was made by Kennedy following the Bay of Pigs had some correlation with the destruction of the Castro administration. Shortly after the invasion ended, Kennedy ordered the Pentagon to design secret operations to overthrow the Castro regime. Also, President Kennedy persuaded his brother Robert to set up a covert action against Castro which was known as "Operation Mongoose".

=== Public reaction ===
Only 3 percent of Americans supported military action in 1960. According to Gallup, 72% of people had a negative view of Fidel Castro in 1960. After the conflict, 61% of Americans approved of the action, while 15% disapproved, and 24% were unsure. This poll was taken by Gallup in late April 1966. A week after the invasion of Cuba, Gallup took another series of polls to sample three possible ways of opposing Castro. The policy that most resembled the Bay of Pigs (if the US "should aid the anti-Castro forces with money and war materials") was still favored by a narrow margin, 44% approval to 41% rejecting this policy.

Kennedy's general approval rating increased in the first survey after the invasion, rising from 78 percent in mid-April to 83 percent in late April and early May. Dr. Gallup's headline for this poll read, "Public Rallies Behind Kennedy in Aftermath of Cuban Crisis." In 1963 a public opinion poll showed 60 percent of Americans believed that Cuba is "a serious threat to world peace," yet 63 percent of Americans did not want the U.S. to remove Castro.

=== Maxwell Taylor survey ===
On 22 April 1961, President Kennedy asked General Maxwell D. Taylor, Attorney General Robert F. Kennedy, Admiral Arleigh Burke, and CIA Director Allen Dulles to form the Cuba Study Group, to report on lessons to learn from the failed operation. General Taylor submitted the Board of Inquiry's report to President Kennedy on 13 June. It attributed the defeat to lack of early realization of the impossibility of success by covert means, to inadequate aircraft, to limitations on armaments, pilots, and air attacks set to attempt plausible deniability – and, ultimately, to loss of important ships and lack of ammunition. The Taylor Commission was criticized, and bias implied. Attorney General Robert F. Kennedy, the President's brother, was included in the group, and the commission collectively was seen to be more preoccupied with deflecting blame from the White House than concerned with discovering why the operation had not been successful. Jack Pfeiffer, who worked as a historian for the CIA until the mid-1980s, simplified his own view of the failed Bay of Pigs effort by quoting a statement which Raúl Castro, Fidel's brother, had made to a Mexican journalist in 1975: "Kennedy vacillated. If at that moment he had decided to invade us, he could have suffocated the island in a sea of blood, but he could have destroyed the revolution. Lucky for us, he vacillated."

=== CIA report ===
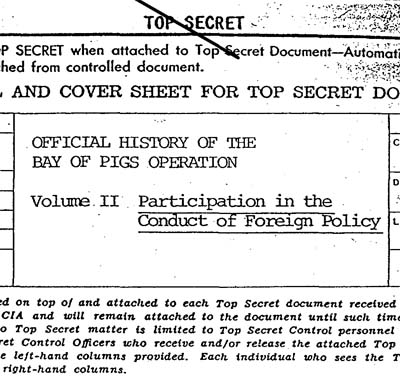
CIA report on the Bay of Pigs Invasion

In November 1961, CIA Inspector-General Lyman Kirkpatrick authored a report, "Survey of the Cuban Operation", that remained classified until 1998. Conclusions were:

1. The CIA exceeded its capabilities in developing the project from guerrilla support to overt armed action without any plausible deniability.
2. Failure to realistically assess risks and to adequately communicate information and decisions internally and with other government principals.
3. Insufficient involvement of leaders of the exiles.
4. Failure to sufficiently organize internal resistance in Cuba.
5. Failure to competently collect and analyze intelligence about Cuban forces.
6. Poor internal management of communications and staff.
7. Insufficient employment of high-quality staff.
8. Insufficient Spanish-speakers, training facilities, and material resources.
9. Lack of stable policies and/or contingency plans.

In spite of vigorous objections by CIA management to the findings, CIA Director Allen Dulles, CIA Deputy Director Charles Cabell, and deputy director for Plans Richard M. Bissell Jr. were all forced to resign by early 1962. In later years, the CIA's behavior in the event became the prime example cited for the psychology paradigm known as groupthink syndrome. Further study shows that among various components of groupthink analyzed by Irving Janis, the Bay of Pigs Invasion followed the structural characteristics that led to irrational decision making in foreign policy pushed by deficiency in impartial leadership. An account of the process of invasion planning reads,

At each meeting, instead of opening up the agenda to permit a full airing of the opposing considerations, [President Kennedy] allowed the CIA representatives to dominate the entire discussion. The president permitted them to refute each tentative doubt immediately that one of the others might express, instead of asking whether anyone else had the same doubt or wanted to pursue the implications of the new worrisome issue that had been raised.

Looking at both the Survey of the Cuban Operation and Groupthink: Psychological Studies of Policy Decisions and Fiascoes by Irving Janis, it identifies the lack of communication and the mere assumption of concurrence to be the main causes behind the CIA and the president's collective failure to efficiently evaluate the facts before them. A considerable amount of information presented before President Kennedy proved to be false in reality, such as the support of the Cuban people for Fidel Castro, making it difficult to assess the actual situation and the future of the operation.

In mid-1960, CIA operative E. Howard Hunt had interviewed Cubans in Havana; in a 1997 interview with CNN, he said, "...all I could find was a lot of enthusiasm for Fidel Castro."

=== Schism within Cuban Revolutionary Council ===
Soon after the failure of the invasion, the Cuban Revolutionary Council split into rival factions. Manuel Ray broke off to form the Junta Revolucionario, and the Student Directorate broke off to manage its own resistance to Castro. Among remaining members of the Cuban Revolutionary Council, a debate erupted as to what the appropriate measures would be regarding regime change. One group argued Carlos Prío Socarrás should be made provisional president, while another group argued that according to the constitution of 1940, a judge should be provisional president.

Other groups engaged in guerrilla warfare in Cuba, including Rescate, the Second National Front of Escambray, and the Insurrectionary Revolutionary Movement. Pepin Bosch also petitioned the U.S. government for assistance in forming a Cuban government in exile, which the U.S. rejected. Afterward, small militant groups focused on small raids onto the Cuban coast.

== Legacy ==
=== Memory in Cuba ===
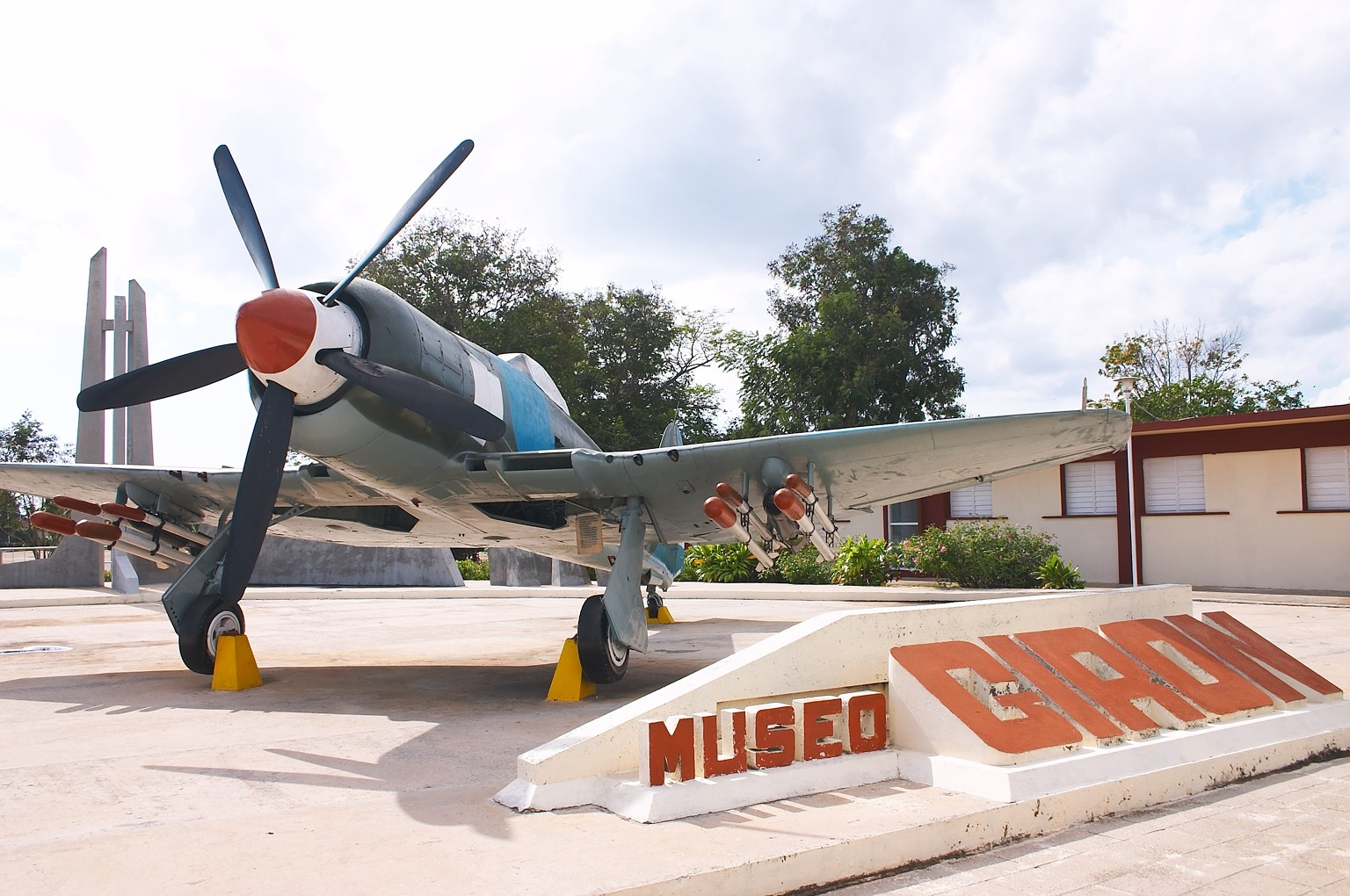
A Sea Fury F 50 preserved at the Museo Girón, Cuba in 2006

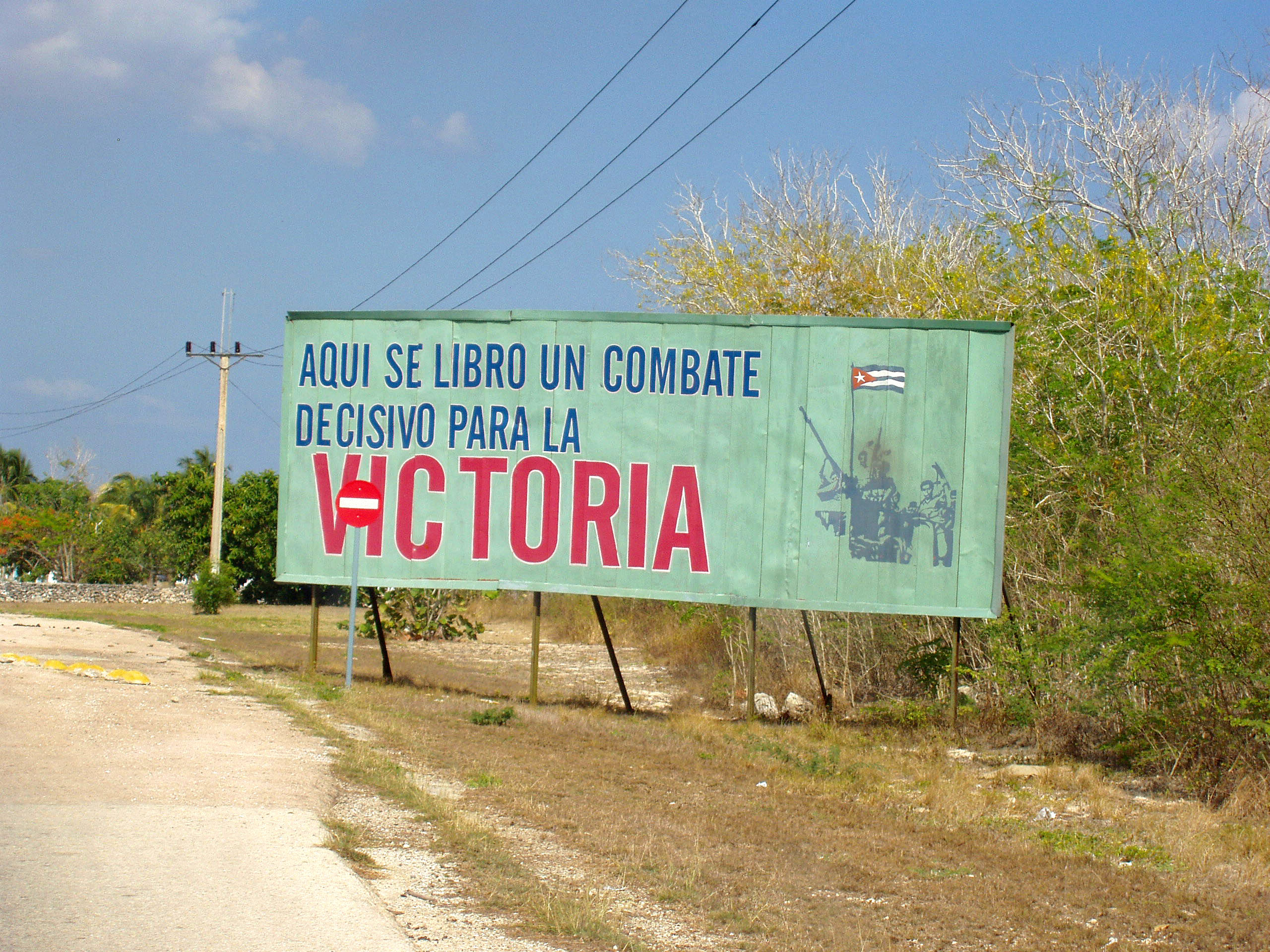
Sign at the Bay of Pigs saying "aqui se libro un combate decisivo para la victoria": (A decisive battle for victory was fought here)

For many Latin Americans, the invasion reinforced the belief that the U.S. could not be trusted. It also showed that the U.S. could be defeated, and thus encouraged political groups in Latin America to counter U.S. influence. Victory made Castro even more popular, fueling nationalistic support for his economic policies. After the air attacks on Cuban airfields on 15 April, he declared the revolution Marxist–Leninist.

In March 2001, shortly before the 40th anniversary of the invasion, a conference took place in Havana, attended by about 60 American delegates. The conference was titled "Bay of Pigs: 40 Years After". The conference was co-sponsored by the University of Havana, Centro de Estudios Sobre Estados Unidos, Instituto de Historia de Cuba, Centro de Investigaciones Históricas de la Seguridad del Estado; Centro de Estudios Sobre America, and the U.S.-based National Security Archive. It commenced on Thursday 22 March 2001 at the Hotel Palco, Palacio de las Convenciones, La Habana. On 24 March, after the conference, many of the delegates and observers travelled by road to Australia sugar mill, Playa Larga, and Playa Girón, the site of the initial landing in the invasion. A documentary film was made of that trip, titled Cuba: The 40 Years War, released on DVD in 2002. A Cuban FAR combatant at the Bay of Pigs, José Ramón Fernández, attended the conference, as did four members of Brigade 2506, Roberto Carballo, Mario Cabello, Alfredo Duran, and Luis Tornes.

There are still yearly nationwide drills in Cuba during the 'Día de la Defensa' (Defense Day), to prepare the population for an invasion.

=== Memory among Cuban exiles ===
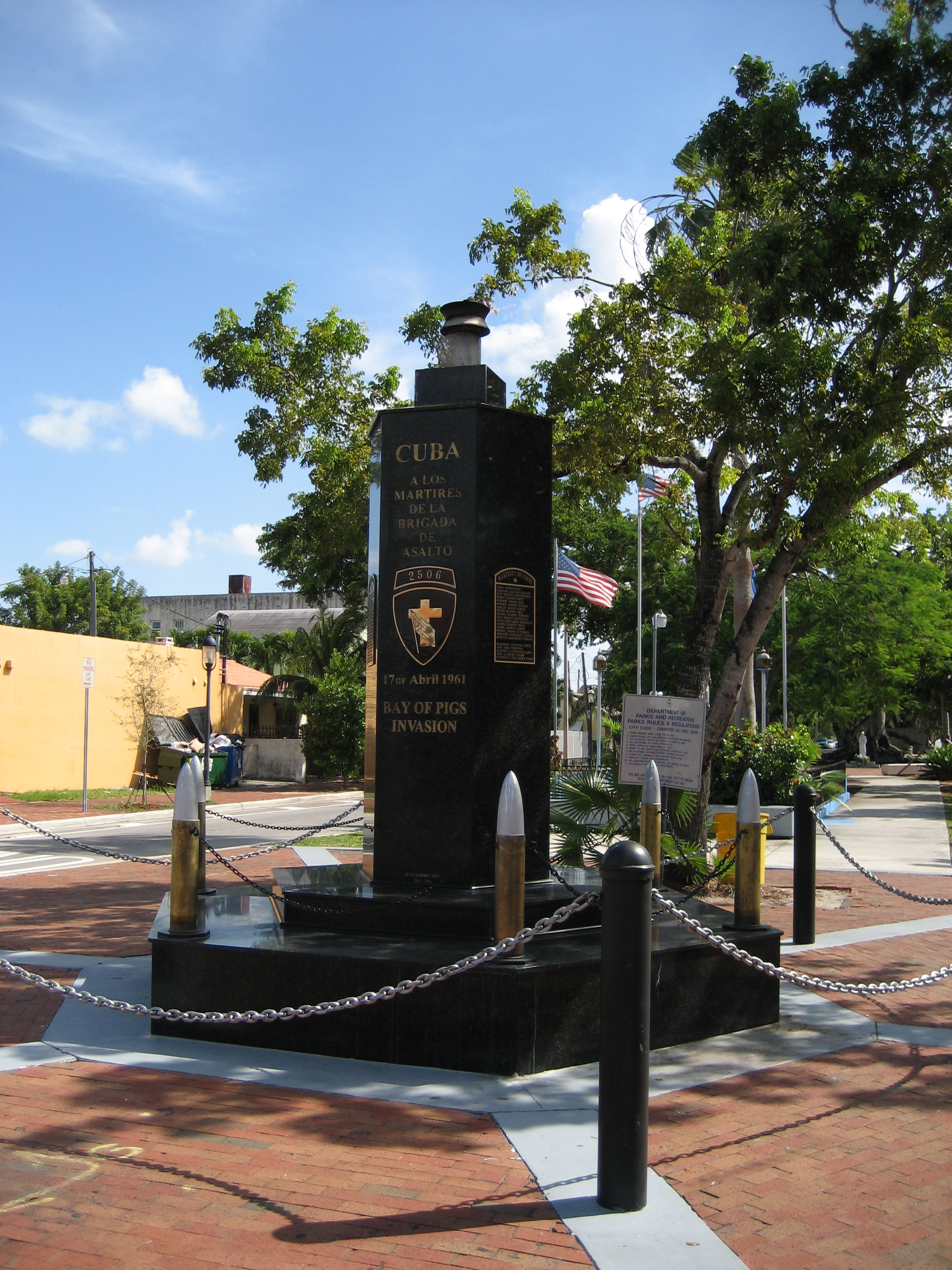
The Bay of Pigs Memorial in Little Havana, Miami

Many who fought for the CIA in the conflict remained loyal to the US after the event; some Bay of Pigs veterans became officers in the U.S. Army in the Vietnam War, including 6 colonels, 19 lieutenant colonels, 9 majors, and 29 captains. By March 2007, about half of the brigade had died. In April 2010, the Cuban Pilot's Association unveiled a monument at the Miami Executive Airport in memory of the 16 aviators for the exile side killed during the battle. The memorial consists of an obelisk and a restored B-26 replica aircraft atop a large Cuban flag.

In the United States, a popular historical reading of the invasion arose, known as Kennedy's betrayal, which proposes that President Kennedy's refusal to give proper air support to Brigade 2506 caused the defeat of the invasion. This lack of air support later spurred a sense that John F. Kennedy had betrayed Brigade 2506. According to some, including Grayston Lynch, Felipe Rivero, and Higinio "Nino" Díaz, this caused Cuban exiles to view JFK as soft on communism. This soft reputation also supposedly pushed early Cuban exiles to vote Republican in contrast to Kennedy's own Democratic party, creating a long tradition of popular support for the Republican party among Cuban Americans. The supposed immediate distaste for Kennedy among early Cuban exiles has also inspired conspiracy theories that Cuban exiles were involved in Kennedy's assassination. Critics of this theory note that a notion of "betrayal" was not popular among Brigade 2506 veterans immediately after the invasion, and that the "Kennedy's betrayal" narrative does not explain the failure of the Bay of Pigs Invasion nor why Cuban Americans came to largely support the Republican party.

== Notable surviving veterans ==
- Pepe San Román
- Erneido Oliva
- José Basulto
- Ricardo Montero Duque
- Alfredo Duran
- Francisco Jose Hernandez
- Félix Rodríguez

== See also ==
- José Miguel Battle Sr.
- Cuba–United States relations
- Escambray rebellion (1959–1965)
- Foreign interventions by the United States
- The Good Shepherd (film) a 2006 movie directed by Robert De Niro about the CIA that has the Bay of Pigs invasion as a key part of the storyline
- Harlot's Ghost: A Novel of the CIA (1991) by Norman Mailer, which deals with the Bay of Pigs CIA operation
- Latin America–United States relations
- Operation Gideon (2020)
- Operation Northwoods (1962)
- Operation Ortsac (1962)
- Operation Red Dog (1981)
- Special Activities Division
- Swan Islands, Honduras
- United States involvement in regime change
- List of United States invasions of Latin American countries
