= Higinio "Nino" Díaz =

Cuban exile Bay of Pigs veteran (1925–2022)

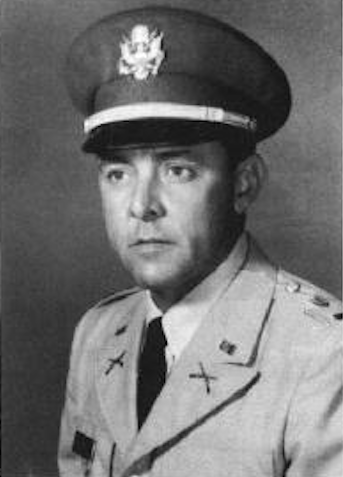
- Born: January 11, 1925; Guantanamo, Cuba
- Died: March 10, 2022 (aged 97); Miami
- Military career
- Branch: 26th of July Movement; Brigade 2506
- Rank: Major
- Conflicts: Cold War; Cuban Revolution; Bay of Pigs Invasion

Higinio "Nino" Díaz Ané (January 11, 1925 – March 2022) was the commander of the guerrilla warfare "Special Battalion" of Brigade 2506 as part of "Operation Mars," which was a feint attack operation that took place alongside "Operation Pluto" during the Bay of Pigs Invasion. Later in life, he started a paramilitary organization called the "Cuban Liberation Army" (EJC).

== Biography ==
Diaz was born in Guantánamo to a peasant family. His father Valentín Díaz y Díaz, was born in Galicia, and his mother, América Ané Galiano, was a Criollo - born in Cuba but to Spanish parents.

During the Cuban Revolution, in the war to overthrow the Cuban dictator Fulgencio Batista, Diaz was a guerrilla army unit commander in the revolutionary 26th of July Movement, under the direct supervision of Fidel Castro in the Sierra Maestra mountains. However, in 1959, Diaz became one of the first revolutionary officers to turn against Castro, and fled the country.

On June 8, 1960, Diaz signed a denouncement of the Castro Government "for betraying the revolution." Other signatories of this document included Manuel Artime, Ricardo Lorie, and Michel Yabor.

In October 1960, Diaz returned to Cuba on a clandestine mission to rouse peasants in the countryside of Oriente Province against the Castro regime. This mission lasted until December.

Later, he was sent by the United States military to the Jungle Operations Training Center in the Panama Canal Zone.

Around this time, the FBI received a tip that there was an alleged kidnapping plot against Diaz, but he was not home.

After this, Diaz was trained with the rest of the Special Battalion at Camp Beauregard.

Operation Mars was planned initially by Vice President Richard Nixon, and kept from the desk of JFK. However, Diaz himself was also not consulted in the planning of Operation Mars, of which he was expected to command the primary ground force.

The text of the original Operations Order read:

"Infiltrate Oriente Province, organize, direct, and control operations designed to harass, interdict and isolate Castro security elements and ultimately gain control of the operational area."

The plan of Operation Mars was to land at the beach near Baracoa. Diaz was orally promised three days of aerial bombardment to support his mission that would occur prior to his departure from Louisiana, but the bombings never happened. Those bombings were called off by someone in the civilian political sphere officially "In order to reduce the appearance of a major military operation which would indicate U.S. involvement."

Diaz and his men left for Cuba aboard the ship Saint Anne, which was commanded by Captain Renato Díaz - the naval Chief of Operation Mars.

On the initial approach to the landing site, 30 miles to the east of Guantanamo, Diaz reported that he lost three of the small boats in his command, and aborted the mission.

However, Time Magazine wrote in 1961 that when Diaz opened his sealed orders on the way to Cuba, he aborted the mission in disgust after seeing that he was being sent to Camagüey, and not his familiar turf in the Oriente province. Robert E. Light and Carl Marzani write this version of events in their book "Cuba Versus CIA."

The CIA's historian Jack B. Pfeiffer wrote in 1984 that: "Diaz was a certifiable coward who had aborted at least one previous anti-Castro operation inside Cuba and he had been identified as an undesirable and unwanted recruit for infantry training with the Brigade in Guatemala."

However, Pedro V. Roig, one of the men who trained under the command of Diaz, wrote that he was a "brave patriot."

In his later years, Diaz wrote in his 2008 autobiography that he formed conspiratorial views about the US Government and blamed them for 'allowing' Fidel Castro - the man he called a "Sephardic Jew from Galicia" - to run Cuba uncontested. He believed that the Bay of Pigs was intentionally sabotaged by President Kennedy, and doomed from the beginning. He also espoused the specifically antisemitic and fascist ideologies of the Spanish language translations of Henry Ford's book The International Jew and Adolf Hitler's book Mein Kampf. Diaz praised Hitler for "saving" Germany from communism and claimed that the Allies had waged a war of aggression against Germany.
