= Consolidation of the Cuban Revolution =

Period of Cuban history (1959–1962)

- Part of the aftermath of the Cuban Revolution and the Cold War
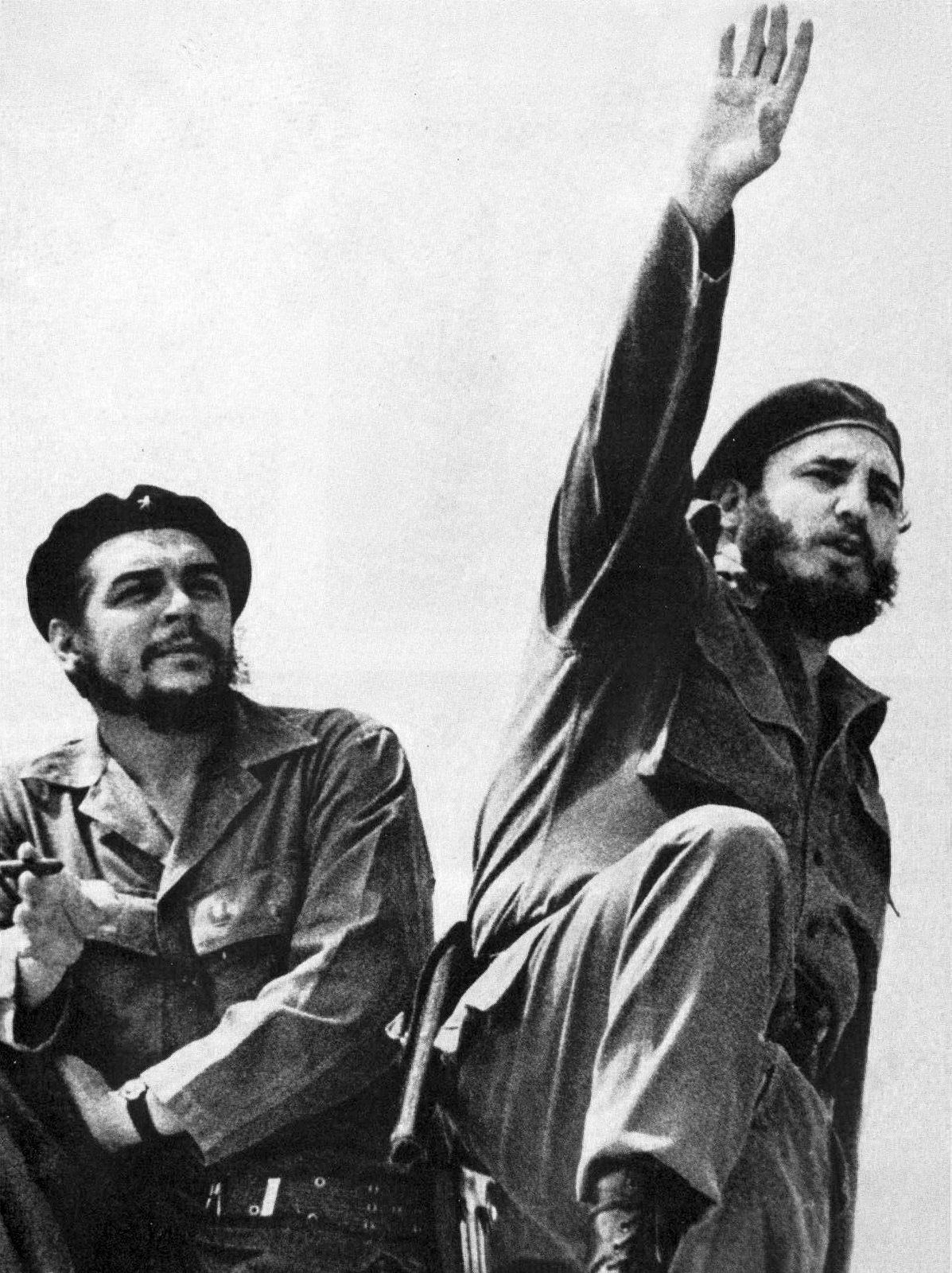
- Che Guevara (left) and Fidel Castro (right) in 1961
- Date: 1 January 1959 – 20 November 1962
- Location: Cuba
- Outcome: Series of events including...: United States embargo against Cuba (1958–today); Escambray rebellion (1959–1965); Cuban exodus (1959–today); Agrarian reforms in Cuba (1959–1962); Cuban literacy campaign (1960–1961); Bay of Pigs Invasion (1961)

The consolidation of the Cuban Revolution is a period in Cuban history typically defined as starting in the aftermath of the revolution in 1959 and ending in 1962, after the total political consolidation of Fidel Castro as the supreme leader of Cuba. The period encompasses early domestic reforms, human rights violations, and the ousting of various political groups. This period of political consolidation climaxed with the resolution of the Cuban Missile Crisis in 1962, which then cooled much of the international contestation that arose alongside Castro's bolstering of power.

This period of political consolidation is also called the radicalization of the revolution, because of the changing ideological nature of Fidel Castro and his provisional government. While the Cuban Revolution had been generally liberal in nature, various controversies pushed Castro and the new provisional government to become increasingly anti-capitalist, anti-American, and eventually Marxist-Leninist.

The political consolidation of Fidel Castro in the new Cuban government began in early 1959. It began with the appointment of communist officials to office and a wave of removals of other revolutionaries that criticized the appointment of communists. This trend came to a head with the Huber Matos affair and would continue so that by mid-1960 little opposition to Castro remained within the government and few independent institutions existed inside Cuba.

As Castro's rule became more entrenched, between 1959 and 1960, Cuba's relationship with the United States began to falter. In the immediate aftermath of the 1959 revolution, Castro visited the United States to ask for aid and boast of land reform plans, which he believed the U.S. government would appreciate. Throughout 1960 tensions slowly escalated between Cuba and the United States due to the nationalizations of various American companies, retaliatory economic sanctions, and counterrevolutionary bombing raids.

In January 1961, the U.S. cut off diplomatic relations with Cuba, and the Soviet Union started to solidify relations with Cuba. The U.S. feared growing Soviet influence in Cuba and backed the Bay of Pigs Invasion of April 1961, which later failed. By December 1961, Castro for the first time openly expressed his communist sympathies. Castro's fears of another invasion and his new Soviet allies influenced his decision to put nuclear missiles in Cuba, triggering the Cuban Missile Crisis. In the aftermath of the crisis, the United States promised not to invade Cuba in the future; in compliance with this agreement, the U.S. withdrew all support from the rebels, effectively crippling the resource-starved resistance. The counterrevolutionary conflict, known abroad as the Escambray rebellion, lasted until about 1965, and has since been branded as the "Struggle Against Bandits" by the Cuban government.

There are various historiographical interpretations of the political consolidation that occurred between 1959 and 1962. There is a periodization of these events, as the beginning of the "militarization of Cuba" which includes a long process of domestic militarization which climaxed in 1970. There is the "grassroots dictatorship" model, which argues that the removal of liberal rights after the Cuban Revolution was the result of mass support and citizen deputization. This mass support came from a popular enthusiasm for national defense against American invasion. There is also the "betrayal thesis" which posits that the political consolidation of Fidel Castro was a betrayal of the democratic aims of the Cuban Revolution against Batista.

== Background ==
=== Ideology of the Cuban Revolution ===
The Cuba Revolution (Spanish: Revolución Cubana) was an armed revolt conducted by Fidel Castro and his fellow revolutionaries of the 26th of July Movement and its allies against the military dictatorship of Cuban President Fulgencio Batista. The revolution began in July 1953, and continued sporadically until the rebels finally ousted Batista on 1 January 1959, replacing his government.

The beliefs of Fidel Castro during the revolution have been the subject of much historical debate. Fidel Castro was openly ambiguous about his beliefs at the time. Some orthodox historians argue Castro was a communist from the beginning with a long-term plan; however, others have argued he had no strong ideological loyalties. Leslie Dewart has stated that there is no evidence to suggest Castro was ever a communist agent. Levine and Papasotiriou believe Castro believed in little outside of a distaste for American imperialism. While Ana Serra believed it was the publication of El socialismo y el hombre en Cuba. As evidence for his lack of communist leanings they note his friendly relations with the United States shortly after the revolution and him not joining the Cuban Communist Party during the beginning of his land reforms.

At the time of the revolution the 26th of July Movement involved people of various political persuasions, but most were in agreement and desired the reinstatement of the 1940 Constitution of Cuba and supported the ideals of Jose Marti. Che Guevara commented to Jorge Masetti in an interview during the revolution that "Fidel isn't a communist" also stating "politically you can define Fidel and his movement as 'revolutionary nationalist'. Of course he is anti-American, in the sense that Americans are anti-revolutionaries".

=== Flight of Batista ===
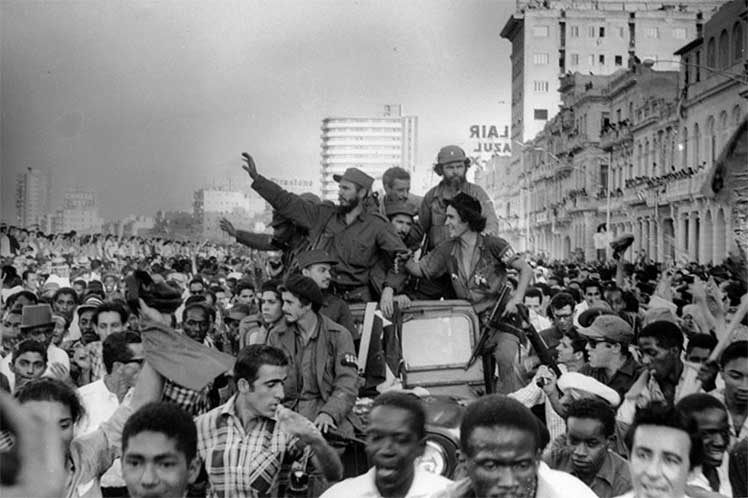
Habana entrance Fidel Castro and Huber Matos. 8 January 1959.

On 31 December 1958, the Battle of Santa Clara took place in a scene of great confusion. The city of Santa Clara fell to the combined forces of Che Guevara, Cienfuegos, and Revolutionary Directorate (RD) rebels led by Comandantes Rolando Cubela, Juan ("El Mejicano") Abrahantes, and William Alexander Morgan. News of these defeats caused Batista to panic. He fled Cuba by air for the Dominican Republic just hours later on 1 January 1959. Comandante William Alexander Morgan, leading RD rebel forces, continued fighting as Batista departed and had captured the city of Cienfuegos by 2 January.

Cuban General Eulogio Cantillo entered Havana's Presidential Palace, proclaimed the Supreme Court judge Carlos Piedra as the new president, and began appointing new members to Batista's old government.

Castro learned of Batista's flight in the morning and immediately started negotiations to take over Santiago de Cuba. On 2 January, the military commander in the city, Colonel Rubido, ordered his soldiers not to fight, and Castro's forces took over the city. The forces of Guevara and Cienfuegos entered Havana at about the same time. They had met no opposition on their journey from Santa Clara to Cuba's capital. Castro himself arrived in Havana on 8 January after a long victory march. His initial choice of president, Manuel Urrutia Lleó, took office on 3 January.

== 1959: "Year of Liberation" ==
=== Rebel victory ===
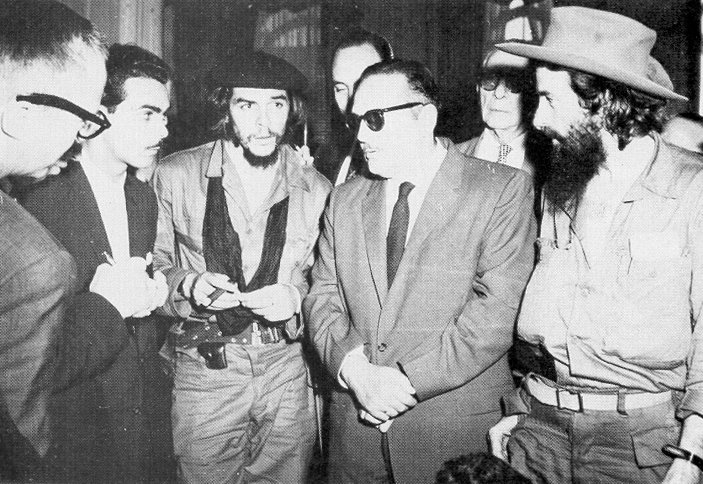
Che Guevara with Manuel Urrutia in 1959, who was president at the beginning of the revolution, after being appointed by the rebels

Castro learned of Batista's flight in the morning of January 1 and immediately started negotiations to take over Santiago de Cuba. On 2 January, the military commander in the city, Colonel Rubido, ordered his soldiers not to fight, and Castro's forces took over the city. The forces of Guevara and Cienfuegos entered Havana at about the same time. The rebels' initial choice of president, Manuel Urrutia Lleó, would later take office on 3 January.

Castro had made his opinion clear that lawyer Manuel Urrutia Lleó should become president, leading a provisional civilian government following Batista's fall. Politically moderate, Urrutia had defended MR-26-7 revolutionaries in court, arguing that the Moncada Barracks attack was legal according to the Cuban constitution. Castro believed Urrutia would make a good leader, being both established yet sympathetic to the revolution. Urrutia had been chosen because of his prestige and acceptability to both the moderate middle-class backers of the revolution and to the guerrilla forces who took part in the alliance formed in Caracas in 1958. with Castro erroneously announcing he had been selected by "popular election"; most of Urrutia's cabinet were MR-26-7 members. On January 8, 1959, Castro's army entered Havana. Proclaiming himself Representative of the Rebel Armed Forces of the Presidency, Castro – along with close aides and family members – set up home and office in the penthouse of the Havana Hilton Hotel, there meeting with journalists, foreign visitors and government ministers.

The new revolutionary government named 1959 the "year of liberation", because of the year's efforts to deconstruct the old Batista government structures.

On 11 January 1959 Ed Sullivan would interview Fidel Castro in Matanzas and broadcast it on The Ed Sullivan Show. In the interview Ed Sullivan refers to Castro and other rebels as "a wonderful group of revolutionary youngsters" and point out their admiration for Catholicism. Fidel Castro would deny the rebels affiliation with communism. Hours after the interview Fidel Castro would ride on captured tanks into the capital in Havana.

Officially having no role in the provisional government, Castro exercised a great deal of influence, largely because of his popularity and control of the rebel army. Ensuring the government implemented policies to cut corruption and fight illiteracy, he did not initially force through any radical proposals. Attempting to rid Cuba's government of Batistanos, the Congress elected under Batista was abolished, and all those elected in the rigged elections of 1954 and 1958 were banned from politics. The government now ruling by decree, Castro pushed the president to issue a temporary ban on all political parties, but repeatedly stated that they would get around to organizing multiparty elections; this never occurred. He began meeting members of the Popular Socialist Party, believing they had the intellectual capacity to form a socialist government, but repeatedly denied being a communist himself.

Once in power, President Urrutia swiftly began a program of closing all brothels, gambling outlets and the national lottery, arguing that these had long been a corrupting influence on the state. The measures drew immediate resistance from the large associated workforce. The disapproving Castro, then commander of Cuba's new armed forces, intervened to request a stay of execution until alternative employment for Casino and brothel workers could be found.

=== Tribunals and executions ===
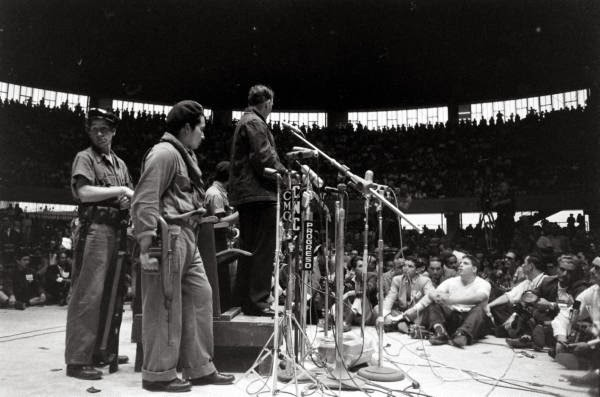
Trial of Jesús Sosa Blanco in the Ciudad Deportiva stadium, 1959

The first major political crisis arose over what to do with the captured Batista officials who had perpetrated the worst of the repression. During the rebellion against Batista's dictatorship, the general command of the rebel army, led by Fidel Castro, introduced into the territories under its control the 19th-century penal law commonly known as the Ley de la Sierra (Law of the Sierra). This law included the death penalty for serious crimes, whether perpetrated by the Batista regime or by supporters of the revolution. In 1959 the revolutionary government extended its application to the whole of the republic and to those it considered war criminals, captured and tried after the revolution. According to the Cuban Ministry of Justice, this latter extension was supported by the majority of the population, and followed the same procedure as those in the Nuremberg trials held by the Allies after World War II.

To implement a portion of this plan, Castro named Guevara commander of the La Cabaña Fortress prison, for a five-month tenure (2 January through 12 June 1959). Guevara was charged by the new government with purging the Batista army and consolidating victory by exacting "revolutionary justice" against those regarded as traitors, chivatos (informants) or war criminals. As commander of La Cabaña, Guevara reviewed the appeals of those convicted during the revolutionary tribunal process. The tribunals were conducted by 2–3 army officers, an assessor, and a respected local citizen. On some occasions the penalty delivered by the tribunal was death by firing-squad. Raúl Gómez Treto, senior legal advisor to the Cuban Ministry of Justice, has argued that the death penalty was justified in order to prevent citizens themselves from taking justice into their own hands, as had happened twenty years earlier in the anti-Machado rebellion. Biographers note that in January 1959 the Cuban public was in a "lynching mood", and point to a survey at the time showing 93% public approval for the tribunal process. Moreover, a 22 January 1959, Universal Newsreel broadcast in the United States and narrated by Ed Herlihy featured Fidel Castro asking an estimated one million Cubans whether they approved of the executions, and being met with a roaring "¡Si!" (yes).

Between 1,000 and 20,000 Cubans are estimated to have been killed at the hands of Batista's collaborators, and many of those sentenced to death were accused of having committed torture and physical atrocities. The newly empowered government carried out executions, punctuated by cries from the crowds of "¡al paredón!" ([to the] wall!) It is widely believed that those executed were guilty of the crimes of which they were accused, but that the trials did not follow due process.

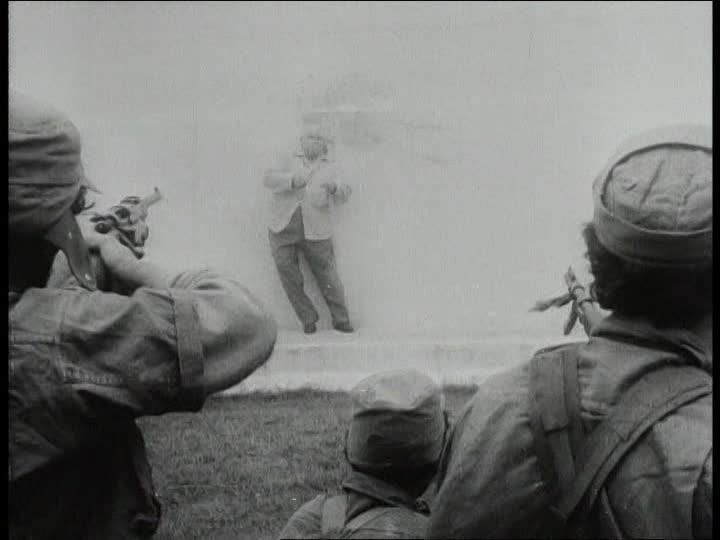
Shooting of Colonel Rojas. (January 7, 1959)

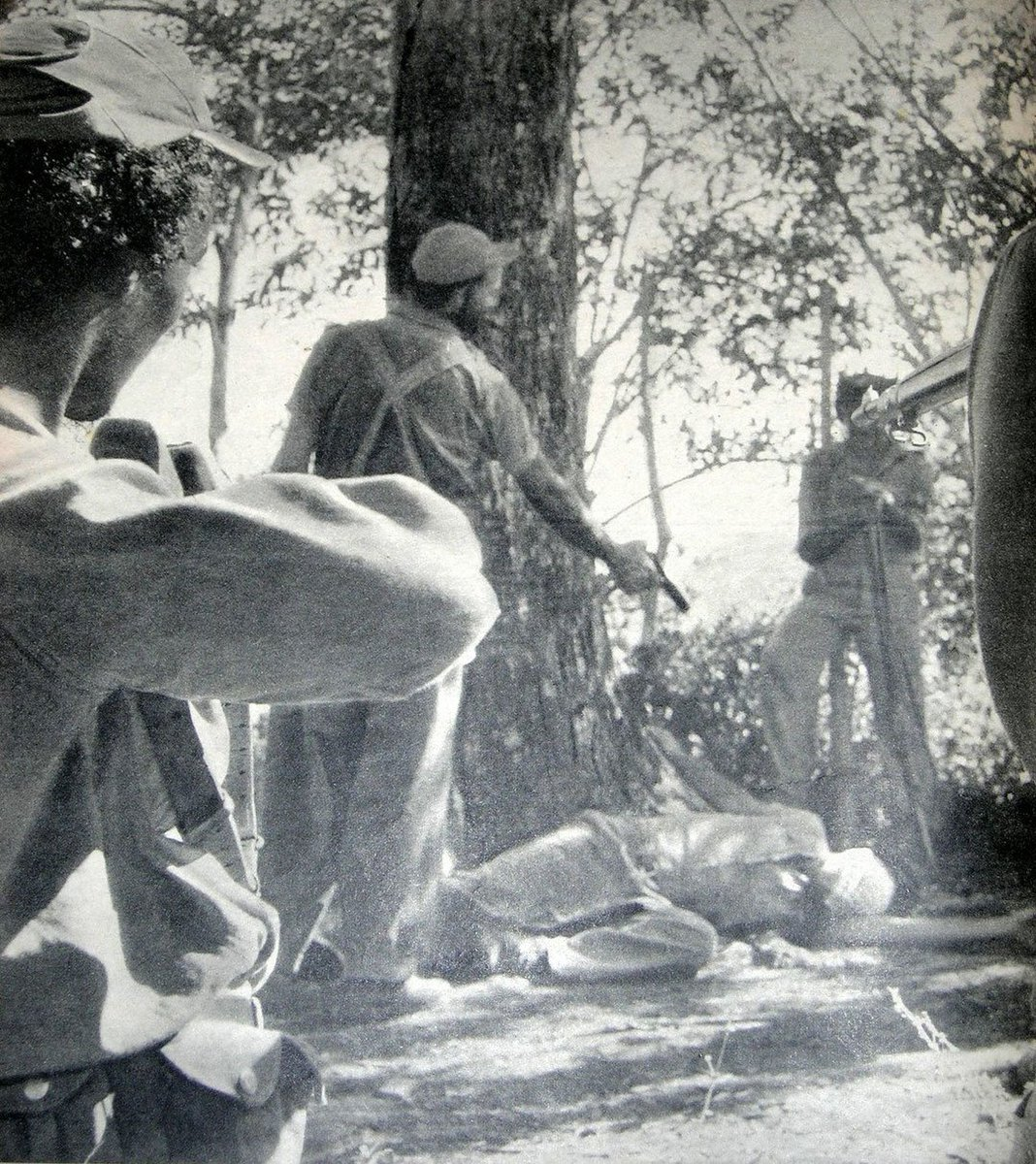
Execution of suspected Batistiano spy (January 10, 1959)

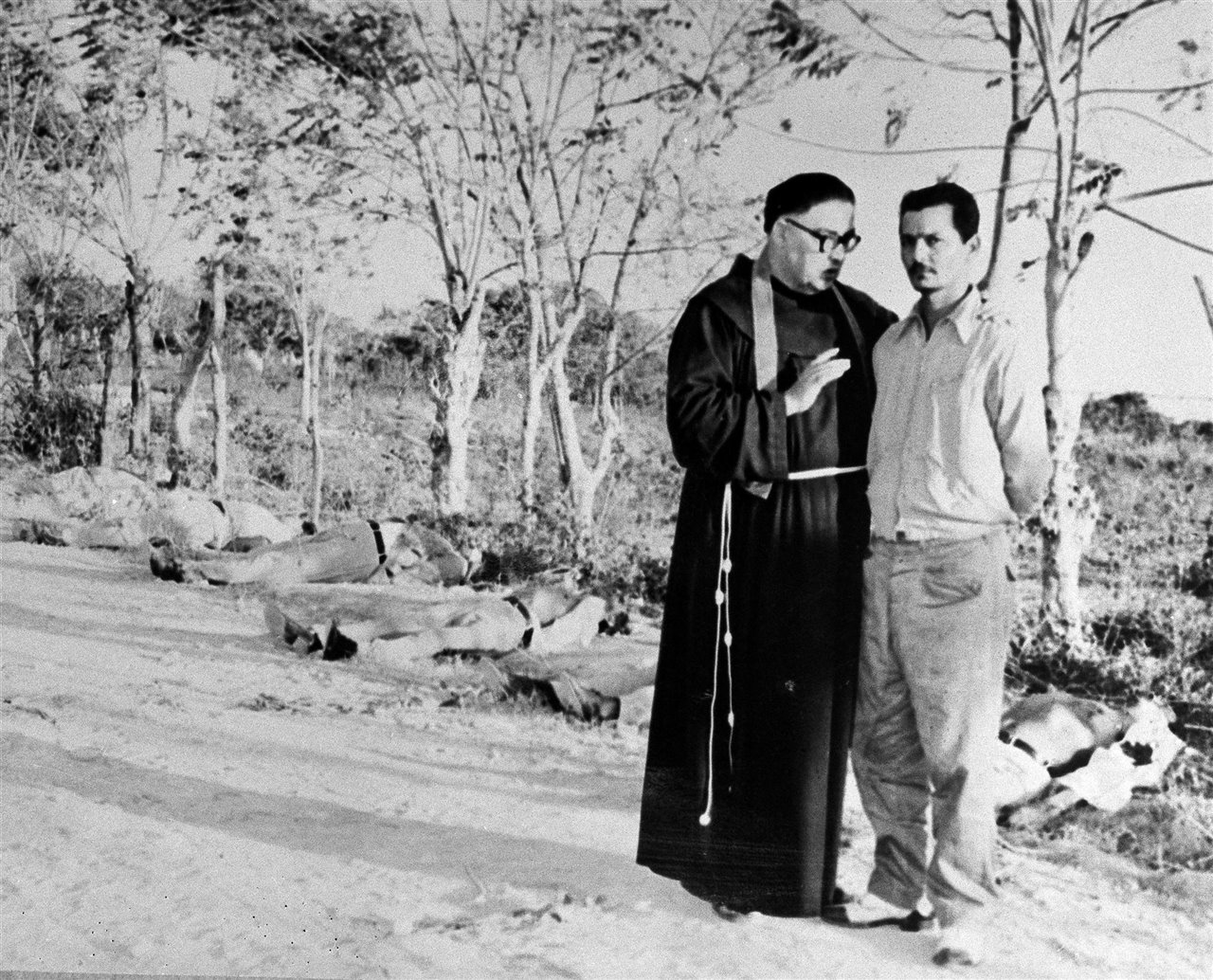
Execution of Arístidez Díaz in Manzanillo, assisted by Father José Luis Sarragoitia Lazpica. Behind are bodies, recently executed. (January 12, 1959).

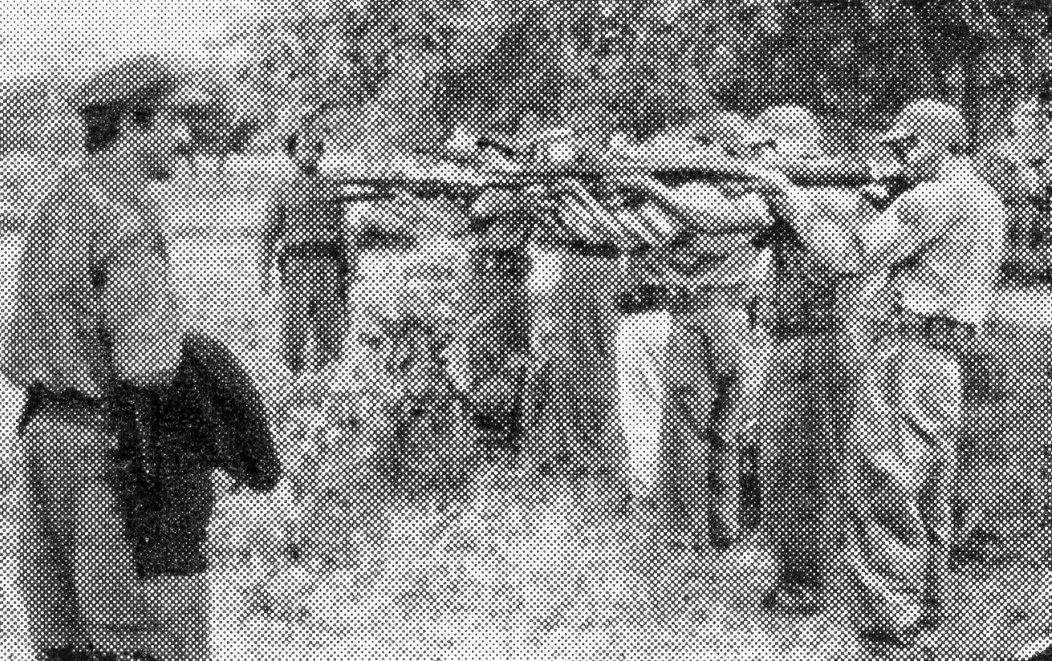
Firing squad for Lieutenant Enrique Despaigne Noret, during the San Juan Hill massacre. (January 12, 1959).

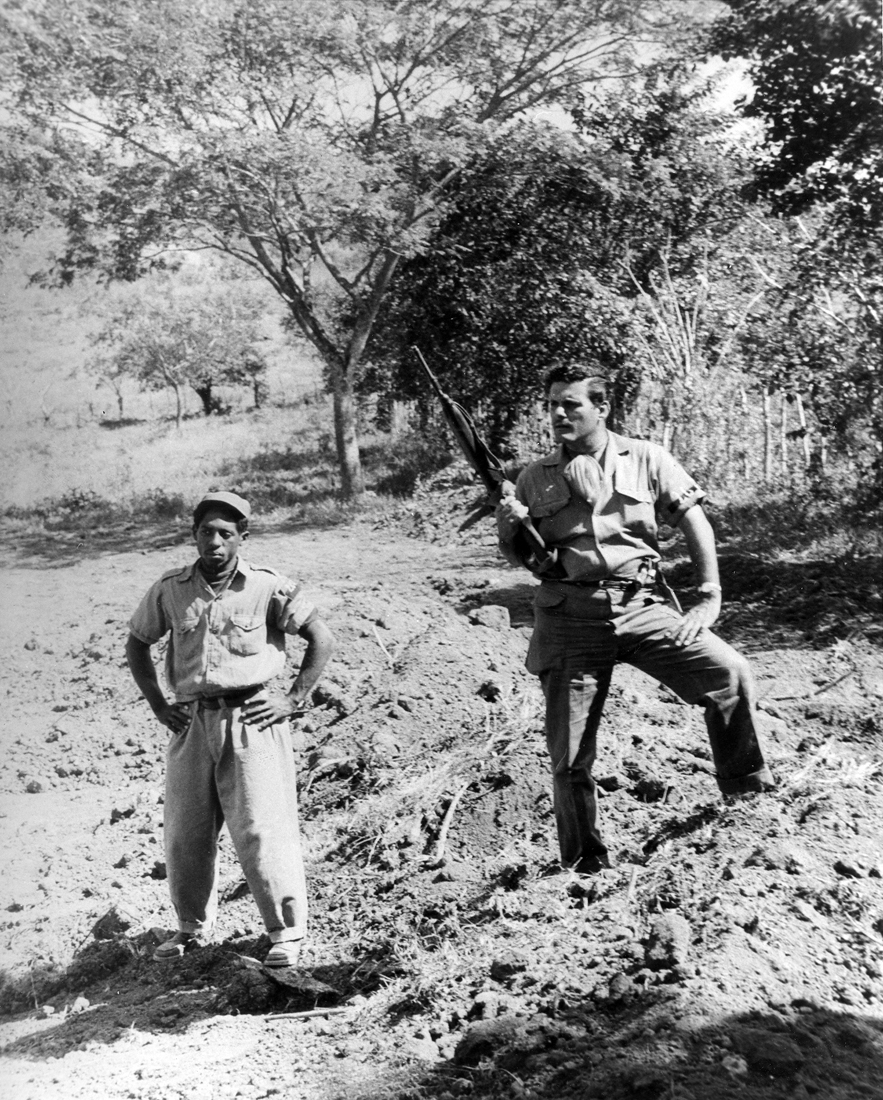
Frank Sturgis stands over a mass grave, after the San Juan Hill massacre. (January 12, 1959).

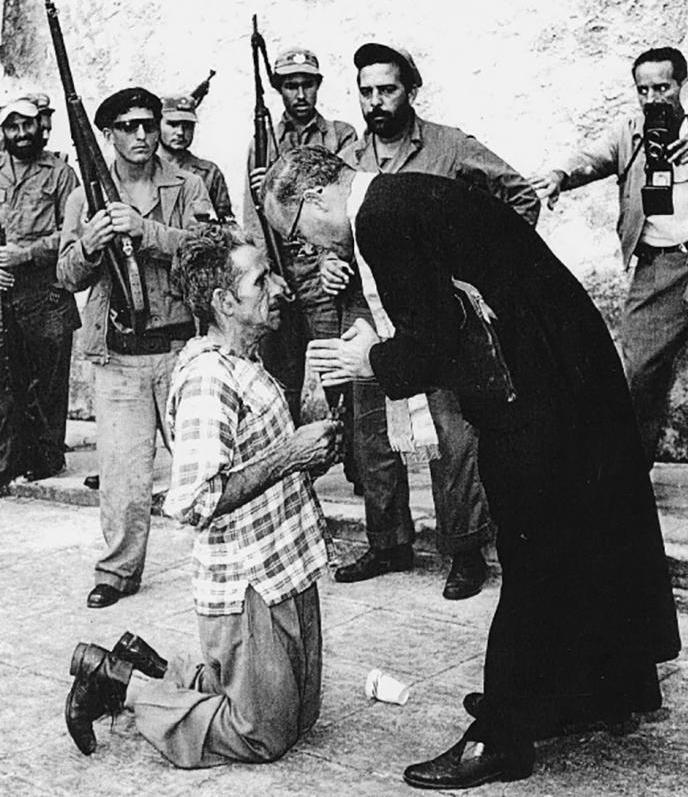
Former corporal Jose Rodriguez, gets last rites from Father Domingo Lorenzo at San Severino Castle. Andrew Lopez received the 1960 Pulitzer Prize for Photography for his execution photos. (January 17, 1959)

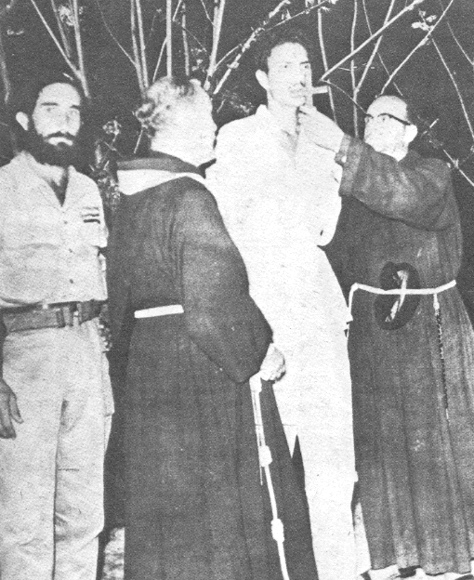
Priests from Manzanillo give last sacraments to Ramón Llópiz Reytor before his execution by firing squad (January 30, 1959).

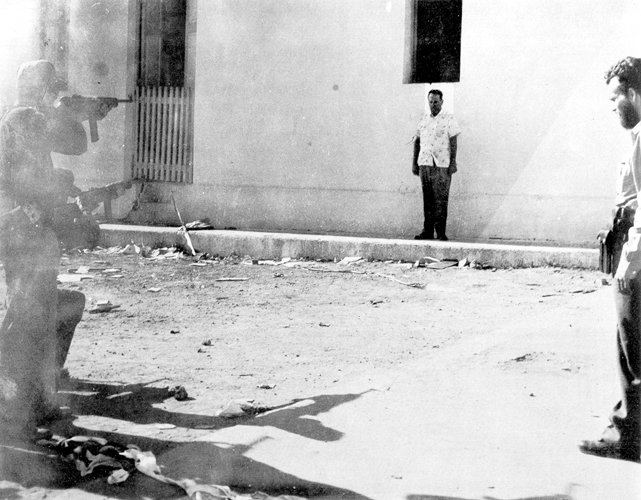
Captain Alejandro García Olayón is executed by a rebel firing squad led by René Rodríguez Cruz (December 10, 1959).

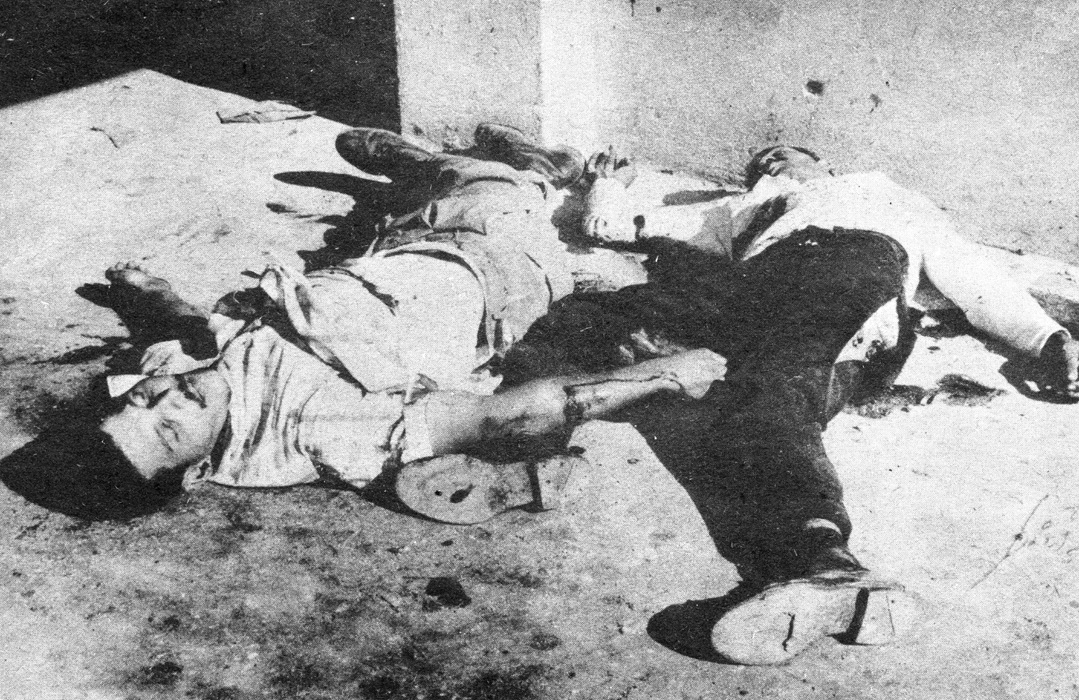
Victims of an execution. Unclear date.

=== Reforms and electoral delay ===
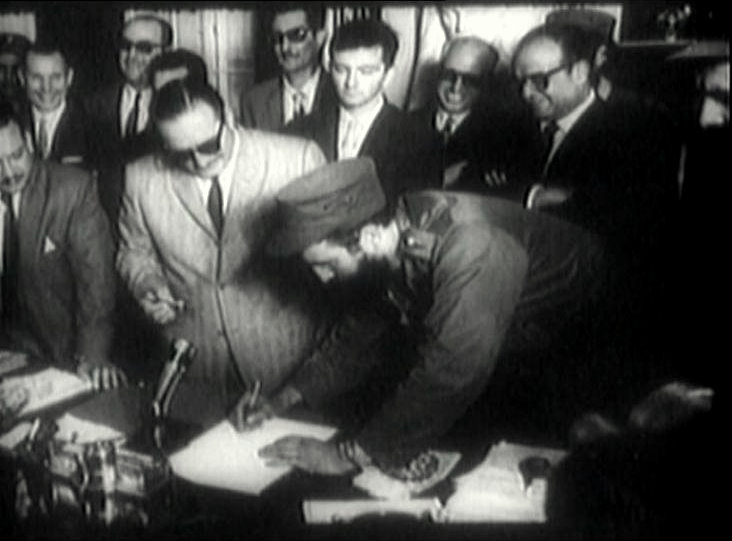
Fidel Castro being signed in as Prime Minister by President Manuel Urrutia

Disagreements arose in the new government concerning pay cuts, which were imposed on all public officials on Castro's demand. The disputed cuts included a reduction of the $100,000 a year presidential salary Urrutia had inherited from Batista.

On February 7, 1959, the Fundamental Law of the Republic went into effect. The law eliminated the legislature, and the irrevocability of ministers and judges. A Council of Ministers was formed which directed government, with Prime Minister José Miró Cardona as head. The President was not allowed to attend council meetings, and could only veto decrees made by the council. The law in total, suspended the Constitution of 1940. Following the surprise resignation of Miró in February, Castro assumed the role of prime minister; this strengthened his power and rendered Urrutia increasingly a figurehead president. As Urrutia's participation in the legislative process declined, other unresolved disputes between the two leaders continued to fester. His belief in the restoration of elections was rejected by Castro, who felt that they would usher in a return to the old discredited system of corrupt parties and fraudulent balloting that had marked the Batista era.

On March 23, 1959, Castro gave a speech that outlined the need for a "battle against racial discrimination" in Cuban society. The following "battle" resulted in a series of laws drafted in 1959 and 1960, outlawing the remaining legal forms of racial segregation in Cuba. Private schools that once had majority white student bodies were now nationalized and faced an influx of new black and mulatto students. Private social clubs were told to integrate as early as January 1959. White and black social clubs began to dissolve. Racism became branded as counterrevolutionary and critics of the government were often branded as racists. Some white Cubans were fearful of integration, while some black Cubans were fearful of the closing of black social clubs and its effects on Afro-Cuban cultural life.

On April 9, 1959, Fidel Castro announced a delay in elections, under the slogan "revolution first, elections later". The cause of the delay was a supposed focus on domestic reforms.

Urrutia was accused by the Avance newspaper of buying a luxury villa, which was portrayed as a frivolous betrayal of the revolution and led to an outcry from the general public. He denied the allegation issuing a writ against the newspaper in response. The story further increased tensions between the various factions in the government, though Urrutia asserted publicly that he had "absolutely no disagreements" with Fidel Castro. Urrutia attempted to distance the Cuban government (including Castro) from the growing influence of the Communists within the administration, making a series of critical public comments against the latter group. Whilst Castro had not openly declared any affiliation with the Cuban communists, Urrutia had been a declared anti-Communist since they had refused to support the insurrection against Batista, stating in an interview, "If the Cuban people had heeded those words, we would still have Batista with us ... and all those other war criminals who are now running away".

=== Fidel Castro's visit to the United States ===
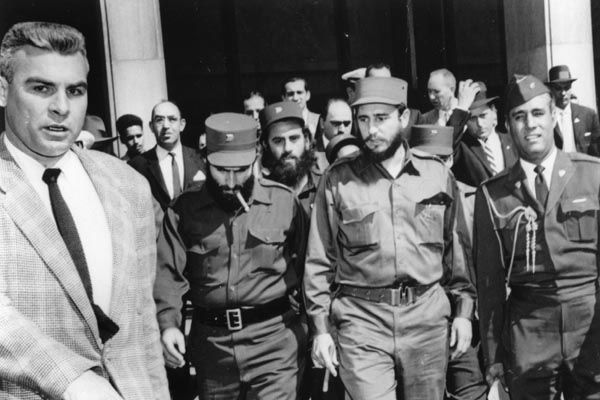
Fidel Castro during a 1959 visit to Washington, D.C. to promote his land reform plans

On 15 April 1959, Castro began an 11-day visit to the United States, at the invitation of the American Society of Newspaper Editors. Fidel Castro made the visit in hopes of securing U.S. aid for Cuba. While there he openly spoke of plans to nationalize Cuban lands and at the United Nations he declared Cuba was neutral in the Cold War. He said during his visit: "I know the world thinks of us, we are Communists, and of course I have said very clear that we are not Communists; very clear."

On April 19, 1959, 97 soldiers left on the yacht Mayari, from Puerto Surgidero in Batabanó, Cuba, to Playa Colorada, San Blas, Panama; arriving at 8:00 pm on Friday, April 24. The invasion party was made up of three Panamanians, one Puerto Rican, one Argentinean, and the others being Cuban. Fidel Castro was touring the United States at the time of the invasion, and declared that the Cuban government took no direct part in plotting the invasion. Margot Fonteyn, the wife of Panamanian invasion leader Roberto Arias, later claimed in her memoir that Arias had met with Castro earlier in January, and was promised soldiers and weapons.

While touring the United States, Fidel Castro met with Vice President Richard Nixon and discussed developments in Cuba. They disagreed as to the timeliness of elections, and economic plans for Cuba, but both agreed that Latin America did not need American weapons, but instead American investment. At the end of their meeting, Nixon wrote of Castro that:

My own appraisal of him as a man is somewhat mixed. The one fact we can be sure of is that he has those indefinable qualities which make him a leader of men. Whatever we may think of him he is going to be a great factor in the development of Cuba and very possibly in Latin American affairs generally. He seems to be sincere, he is either incredibly naive about Communism or under Communist discipline-my guess is the former and I have already implied his ideas as to how to run a government or an economy are less developed than those of almost any world figure I have met in fifty countries. But because he has the power to lead we have no choice but at least to try to orient him in the right direction.

The invasion force in Panama eventually surrendered, on 1 May 1959 after negotiating with the investigating committee of the Organization of American States consisting of representatives from Brazil, the United States, Argentina, Costa Rica, and Paraguay. The invading force claimed that their surrender was in accordance with Castro's orders.

=== Agrarian reform and resignations ===
In the summer of 1959, Fidel began nationalizing plantation lands owned by American investors as well as confiscating the property of foreign landowners. He also seized property previously held by wealthy Cubans who had fled. He nationalized sugar production and oil refinement, over the objection of foreign investors who owned stakes in these commodities.

On July 17, 1959, Conrado Bécquer, the sugar workers' leader demanded Urrutia's resignation. Castro himself resigned as Prime Minister of Cuba in protest, but later that day appeared on television to deliver a lengthy denouncement of Urrutia, claiming that Urrutia "complicated" government, and that his "fevered anti-Communism" was having a detrimental effect. Castro's sentiments received widespread support as organized crowds surrounded the presidential palace demanding Urrutia's resignation, which was duly received. On July 23, Castro resumed his position as premier and appointed Osvaldo Dorticós as the new president.

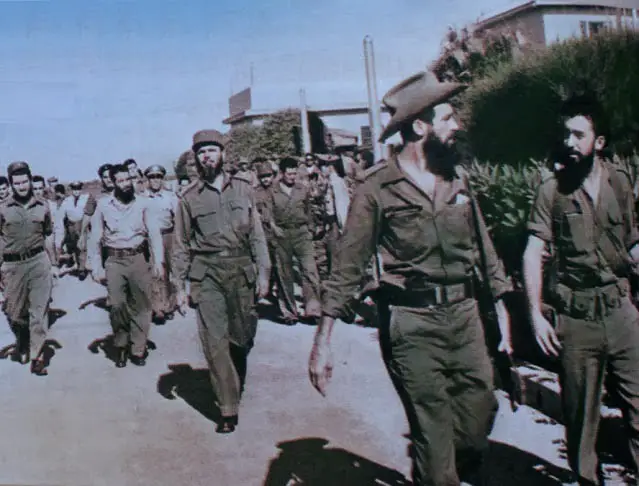
Arrest of Huber Matos (back), with Camilo Cienfuegos (in front) leading

In July 1959, army commando Huber Matos grew suspicious of the new government after the deposition of President Manuel Urrutia Lleó, and attempted to soon resign. On 26 July, Castro and Matos met at the Hilton Hotel in Havana, where, according to Matos, Castro told him: "Your resignation is not acceptable at this point. We still have too much work to do. I admit that Raúl [Castro] and Che [Guevara] are flirting with Marxism ... but you have the situation under control ... Forget about resigning ... But if in a while you believe the situation is not changing, you have the right to resign."

Matos, then serving as military chief of Camagüey province, had complained to Fidel Castro that communists were being allowed to occupy leadership positions in the revolutionary government and the army. Finding Castro unwilling to discuss his concerns, Matos sent a letter to Castro resigning his command. Castro denounced Matos and sent troops to occupy key positions in Camagüey, expecting incorrectly that Matos would lead a revolt, and named Camilo Cienfuegos to take command and to arrest Matos. Matos pleaded with Cienfuegos who was a close friend, to listen to his concerns, but Cienfuegos assured him it could be worked out and arrested Matos. Shortly after Hubert Matos' detention various other disillusioned figures would send in their resignations. Felipe Pazos would resign as head of the National Bank and be replaced within a month by Che Guevara. Cabinet members Manuel Ray and Faustino Perez also resigned. The scandal is noted for its occurrence alongside a greater trend of removals of Fidel Castro's former collaborators in the revolution. It marked a turning point where Fidel Castro was beginning to exert more personal control over the new government in Cuba. Cienfuegos himself would soon die in a mysterious plane crash shortly after the incident.

The United States was already suspicious of Fidel Castro after he enacted the Agrarian Reform Law banning foreigners from owning land and his appointment of communist Nuñez Jimenez as head of the reform program. U.S. President Eisenhower refused any aggressive action against Cuba knowing it would push Cuba towards an alliance with the Soviet Union in the Cold War.

=== Emigration ===
By the middle of 1959 various new policies had affected Cuban life such as the redistribution of property, nationalization of religious and private schools, and the banning of racially exclusive social clubs. Those that began to leave the island were driven by them being negatively affected by new economic policies, their distaste with new national public schools, or anxiety over government supported racial integration. Many middle class emigrants were often professionals that were tied to American companies that were nationalized.

Many of the emigrants that would leave believed they would be returning soon to Cuba, believing the U.S. would soon intervene and overthrow the Fidel Castro government. Some of those exiled in the United States would organize a militant resistance to the Fidel Castro government.

The flight of many skilled workers after the revolution caused a “brain drain.” This loss of trained professionals sparked a renovation of the Cuban education system to accommodate the education of new professionals to replace those that had emigrated.

== 1960: "Year of Agrarian Reform" ==
=== Sanctions and internal repression ===
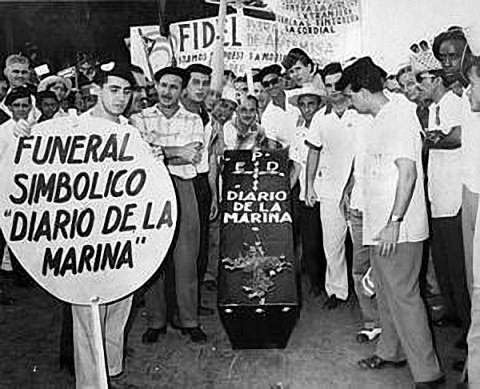
Symbolic funeral for the magazine Diario de la Marina, a target of coletillas and later censorship.

Journalists and editors began to criticize Castro's left-ward turn, the pro-Castro printers' trade union began to harass and disrupt press actions. In January 1960, the government proclaimed that each newspaper need to publish a "coletilla": a clarification, by the printers' union at the end of every article that criticized the government. These "clarifications" signaled the start of press censorship in Castro's Cuba.

As the United States began to grow colder in relations with Cuba, the Soviet Union began much warmer relations. In February Soviet Deputy Premier Anastas Mikoyan visited Havana which resulted in a major Cuban-Soviet trade agreement which gave Cuba Soviet oil in exchange for sugar.

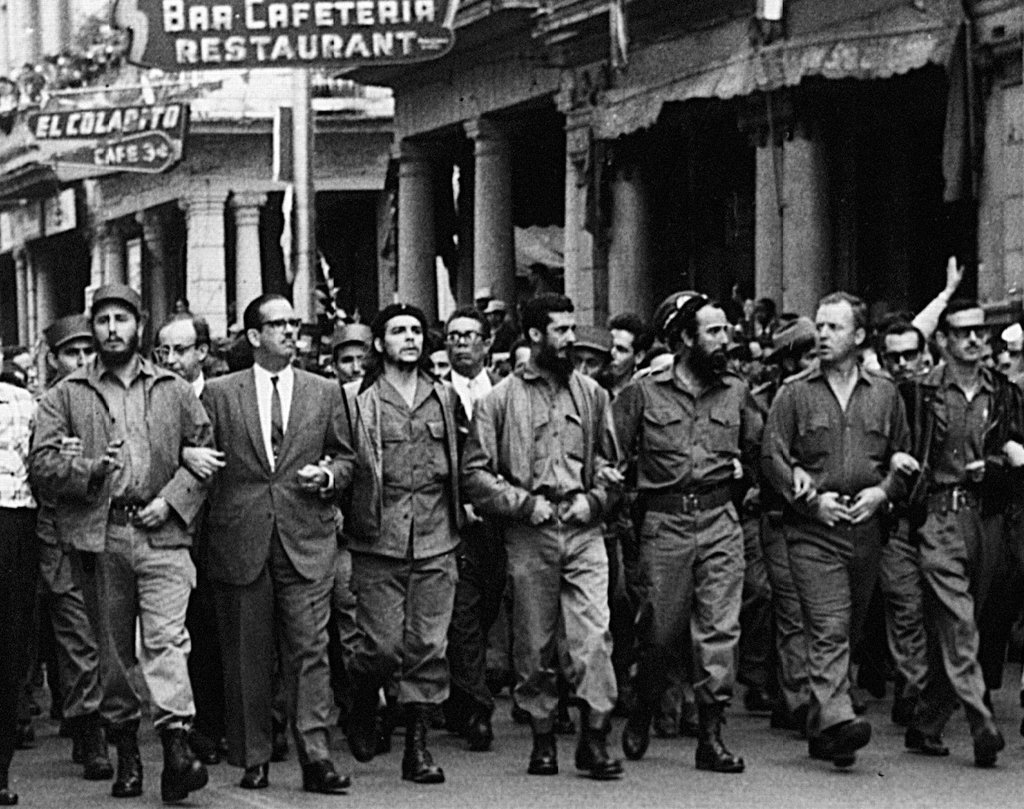
Fidel Castro (far left), Che Guevara (centre) and William Alexander Morgan (second from the right) lead a memorial march in Havana on 5 March 1960 for the victims of La Coubre freight ship explosion.

Cuba-United States relations were heavily strained after the explosion of a French vessel, the La Coubre, in Havana harbor in March 1960. The ship carried weapons purchased from Belgium, and the cause of the explosion was never determined, but Castro publicly insinuated that the U.S. government was guilty of sabotage, and wanted to use the explosion as the first stage of an invasion. He ended this speech with "¡Patria o Muerte!" ("Fatherland or Death"), a proclamation that he made much use of in ensuing years.

There had already existed for months a popular desire for some form of urban-based civil defense against sabotage but the actual formation of such an institution came after the La Coubre explosion. The Committees for the Defense of the Revolution were formed. Local CDR groups were tasked with keeping "vigilance against counter-revolutionary activity", keeping a detailed record of each neighborhood's inhabitants' spending habits, level of contact with foreigners, work and education history, and any "suspicious" behavior. Among the increasingly persecuted groups were homosexual men.

In April the first shipment of 300,000 tons of Soviet oil arrived in Cuba. Oil refineries owned by United States companies refused to refine the oil so the Cuban government nationalized the refineries in June.

On May Day, 1960, Fidel Castro outright condemned elections as corrupt, and canceled all future elections. Castro claimed the revolution had created an informal direct democracy, in which the people and the government had a close bond, thus elections were pointless.

In the summer of 1960, major fidelistas were breaking with Castro, and forming dissident groups. Former government ministers Manuel Ray, and Rufo Lopez-Fresquet, as well as labor leader David Salvador, formed the Movimiento Revolucionario del Pueblo, advocating for a "Fidelismo without Fidel", meaning that Castro's social reforms should continue, but not Castro's personal consolidation of power.

Commander William Alexander Morgan, along with other members of the Second National Front of the Escambray were becoming increasingly skeptical of Fidel Castro. In the middle of June 1960, Morgan and a select few former SNFE leaders met to discuss Castro's turn towards socialism and protecting the Revolution. As the arrests of Morgan's former rebel comrades for counter-revolutionary activities started to increase, Morgan organized weapons to be smuggled to the counter-revolutionaries in the Escambray.

In June 1960, the Cuban Democratic Revolutionary Front announced its existence in Mexico City. It hoped to serve as an umbrella organization for various Cuban opposition groups. The included groups were the Constitutional Democratic Rescue Organization, the Movement for Revolutionary Recovery, the Montecristi Organization, the Christian Democrat Movement, the Triple A Organization, and the Anti-Communist Associations Bloc. The super-group criticized Castro's removal of civil liberties, and demanded the restoration of the constitution of 1940. Most of the participating opposition groups had already been active in the earlier opposition to Batista.

In July the United States suspended the purchase of 700,000 tons of sugar from Cuba, four days later the Soviet Union announced they would buy one million tons of Cuban sugar. In August the United States announced a total economic embargo on Cuba and threatened other Latin American and European nations with reprisals if they did not do the same.

=== Fidel Castro's visit to New York City ===
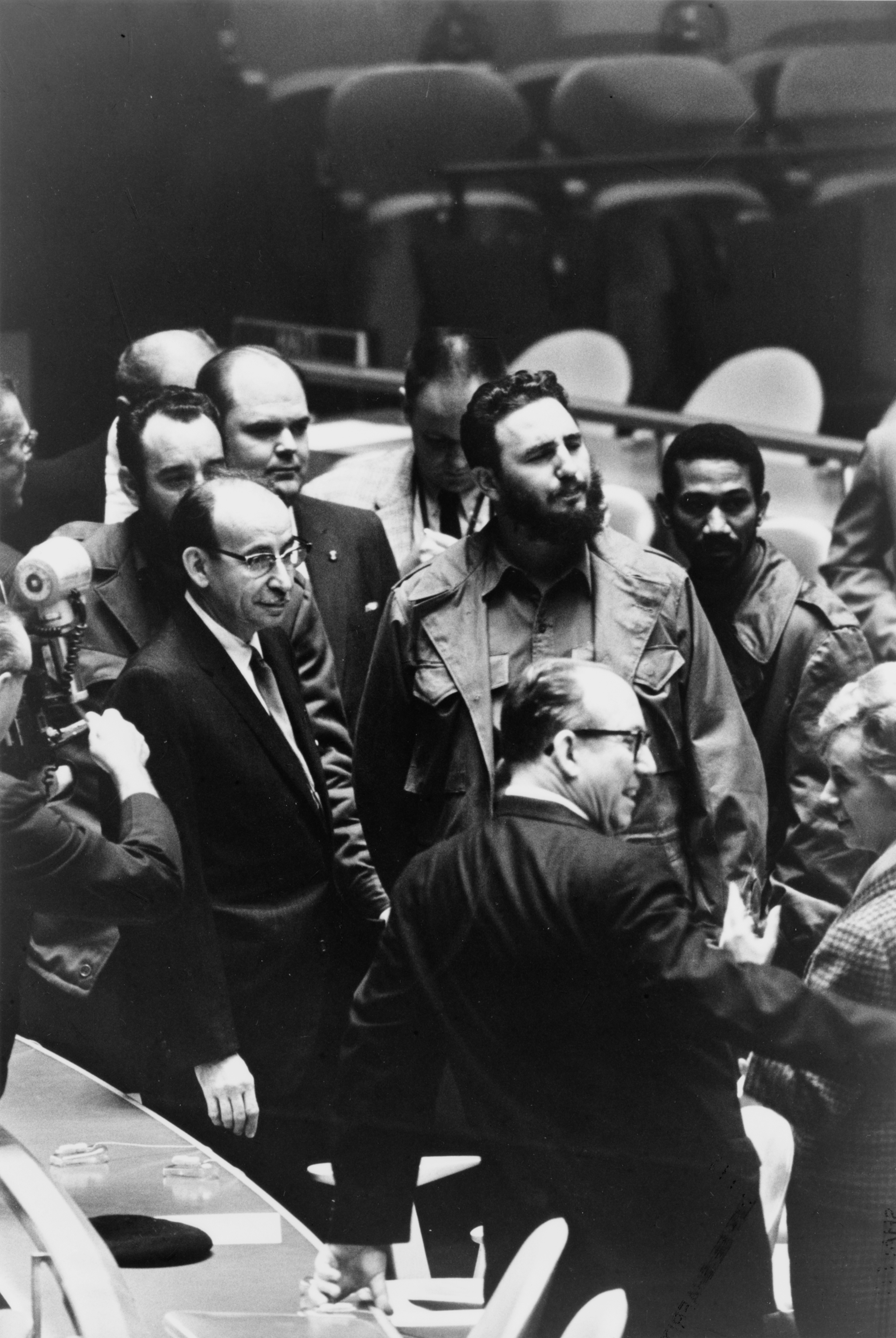
Fidel Castro at the 1960 United Nations General Assembly in New York City

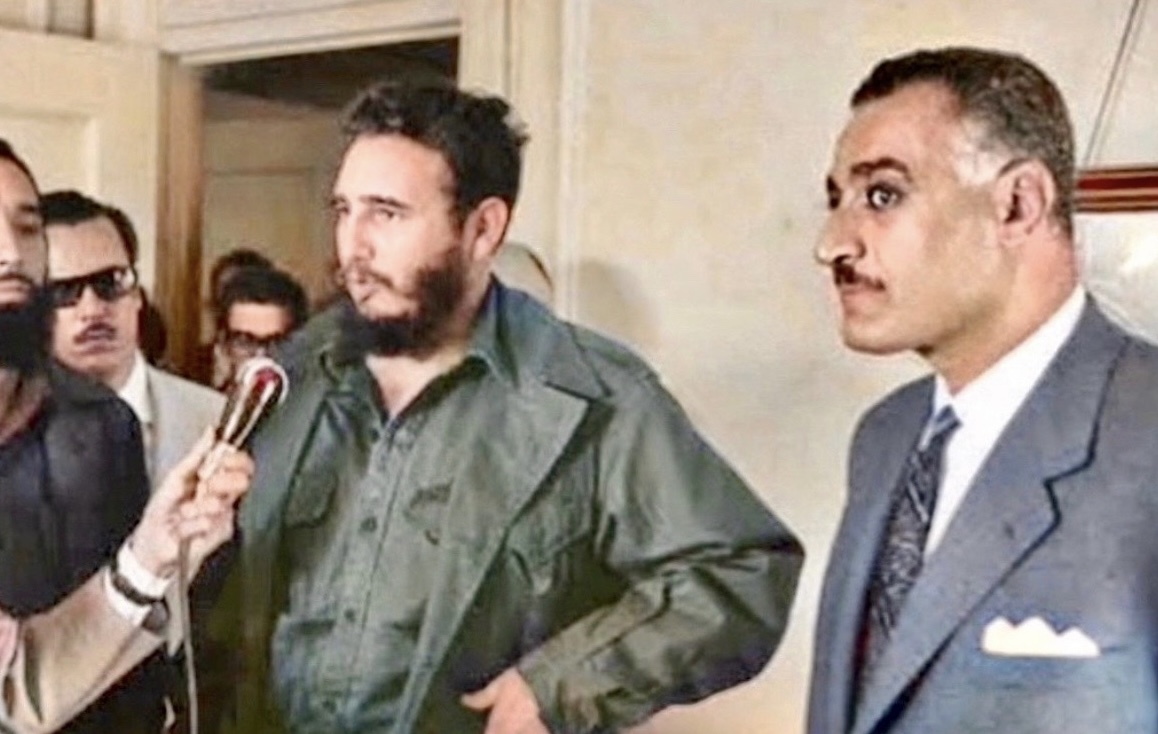
Castro giving press statement next to Egypt's President Gamal Abdel Nasser before their meeting on the sidelines of United Nations General Assembly in 1960

Fidel Castro made a trip to New York City starting September 18 to attend the United Nations General Assembly. While there, international tensions were much higher than during his 1959 trip and he was restricted to only staying on Manhattan island. Castro checked in to the Shelbourne Hotel then checked out a few hours later, complaining that the Shelbourne had asked for a $10,000 cash advance. Castro would then threaten the United Nations that he would camp in Central Park if he couldn't find lodging, eventually checking into the Hotel Theresa in Harlem. While there Castro would meet with various interviewers with African-American newspapers, and other notable people such as Malcolm X, Langston Hughes, Nikita Khrushchev, and Allen Ginsberg. During his stay various Castro supporters and opponents would crowd the outside of the hotel, often fighting. Various sensationalist stories came out about Castro at the time, rumors claimed his entourage were harboring prostitutes in the hotel and that Castro was originally kicked out of the Shelbourne for keeping live chickens in the room. By September 26 Castro would finally speak at the U.N. and would speak for over four hours in denouncing United States foreign policy. Two days later Castro would return to Cuba in a Soviet jet, after his jets were repossessed at the airport.

=== Further nationalization ===
In September 1960, when Che Guevara was asked about Cuba's ideology at the First Latin American Congress, he replied, "If I were asked whether our revolution is Communist, I would define it as Marxist. Our revolution has discovered by its methods the paths that Marx pointed out."

On 13 October 1960, the US government then prohibited the majority of exports to Cuba – the exceptions being medicines and certain foodstuffs – marking the start of an economic embargo. In retaliation, the Cuban National Institute for Agrarian Reform took control of 383 private-run businesses on 14 October, and on 25 October a further 166 US companies operating in Cuba had their premises seized and nationalized, including Coca-Cola and Sears Roebuck. On 16 December, the US then ended its import quota of Cuban sugar.

Nationalization took place alongside efforts to ensure affordable housing, healthcare, and employment for all Cubans. In order for a transformation of consciousness to occur alongside political and economic changes, Guevara proposed that structural changes had to be accompanied by a conversion in people's social relations and values. Believing that the attitudes in Cuba towards race, women, individualism, and manual labor were the product of the island's outdated past, all individuals were urged to view each other as equals and take on the values of what Guevara termed "el Hombre Nuevo" (the New Man). Guevara hoped his "new man" to be ultimately "selfless and cooperative, obedient and hard working, gender-blind, incorruptible, non-materialistic, and anti-imperialist".

On October 16, 1960, Castro ordered the arrest of William Alexander Morgan due to counter-revolutionary activities. Three days later, Morgan was physically arrested while attending a meeting for the National Institute for Agrarian Reform, to which he had been summoned. Morgan was formally charged with plotting to join and lead the counter-revolutionaries who were active in the Escambray Mountains. On March 11, 1961, shortly after a military trial at La Cabaña fortress, Morgan, then 32 years old, was shot by firing squad with Fidel and Raúl Castro in attendance.

== 1961: "Year of Education" ==
=== Bay of Pigs Invasion ===
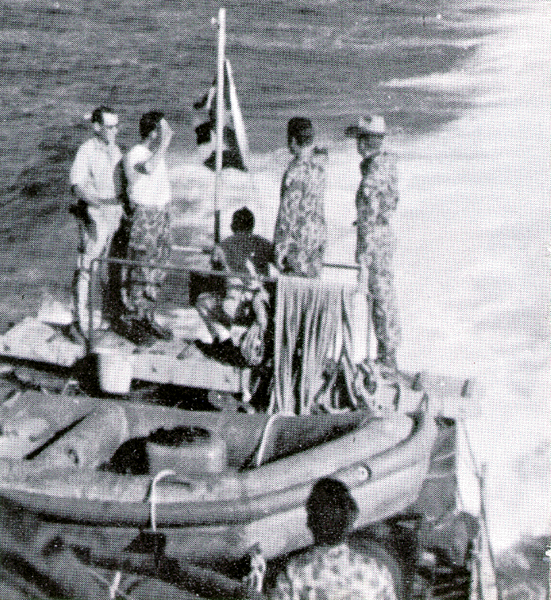
Brigade 2506 sailing to invade Cuba.

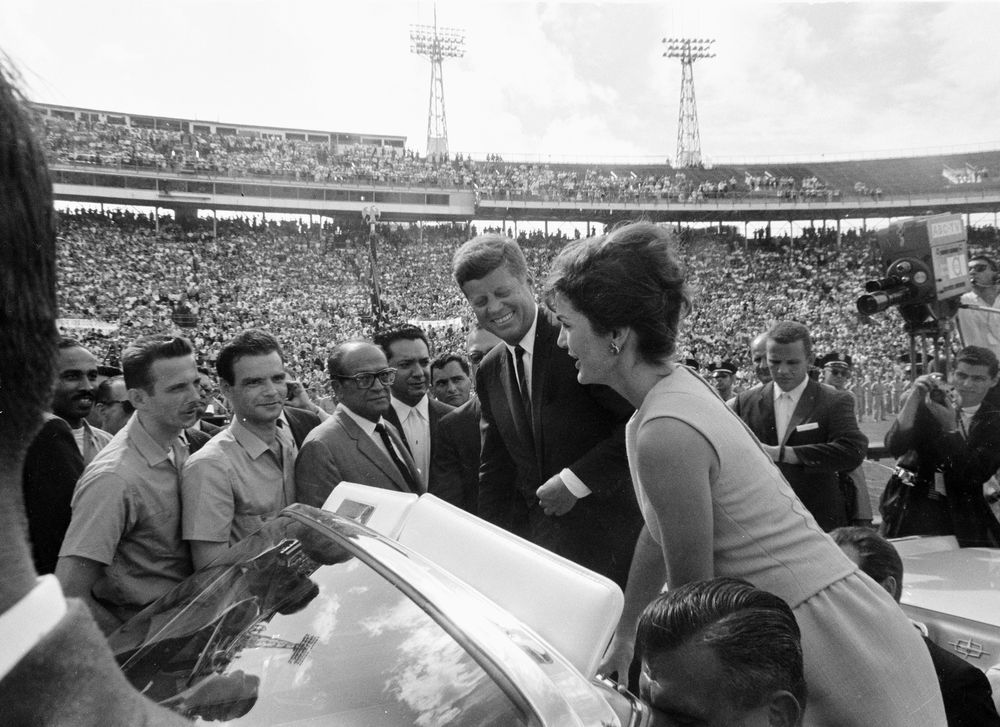
John F. Kennedy meeting members of Brigade 2506 after the Bay of Pigs Invasion

In January 1961, Castro ordered Havana's U.S. Embassy to reduce its 300 staff, suspecting many to be spies. The U.S. responded by ending diplomatic relations, and increasing CIA funding for exiled dissidents; these militants began attacking ships trading with Cuba, and bombed factories, shops, and sugar mills. Both Eisenhower and his successor John F. Kennedy supported a CIA plan to aid a dissident militia, the Democratic Revolutionary Front, to invade Cuba and overthrow Castro; the plan resulted in the Bay of Pigs Invasion in April 1961. On 15 April, CIA-supplied B-26's bombed three Cuban military airfields; the U.S. announced that the perpetrators were defecting Cuban air force pilots, but Castro exposed these claims as false flag misinformation. Fearing invasion, he ordered the arrest of between 20,000 and 100,000 suspected counter-revolutionaries, publicly proclaiming that "What the imperialists cannot forgive us, is that we have made a Socialist revolution under their noses". This was his first announcement that the government was socialist.

The CIA and Democratic Revolutionary Front had based a 1,400-strong army, Brigade 2506, in Nicaragua. At night, Brigade 2506 landed along Cuba's Bay of Pigs, and engaged in a firefight with a local revolutionary militia. Castro ordered Captain José Ramón Fernández to launch the counter-offensive, before taking personal control himself. After bombing the invader's ships and bringing in reinforcements, Castro forced the Brigade's surrender on 20 April. He ordered the 1189 captured rebels to be interrogated by a panel of journalists on live television, personally taking over questioning on 25 April. 14 were put on trial for crimes allegedly committed before the revolution, while the others were returned to the U.S. in exchange for medicine and food valued at U.S. $25 million.

In August 1961, during an economic conference of the Organization of American States in Punta del Este, Uruguay, Che Guevara sent a note of "gratitude" to United States President John F. Kennedy through Richard N. Goodwin, Deputy Assistant Secretary of State for Inter-American Affairs. It read "Thanks for Playa Girón (Bay of Pigs). Before the invasion, the revolution was shaky. Now it's stronger than ever." In response to United States Treasury Secretary Douglas Dillon presenting the Alliance for Progress for ratification by the meeting, Guevara antagonistically attacked the United States' claim of being a "democracy", stating that such a system was not compatible with "financial oligarchy, discrimination against blacks, and outrages by the Ku Klux Klan".

=== Literacy campaign and Pedro Pan ===
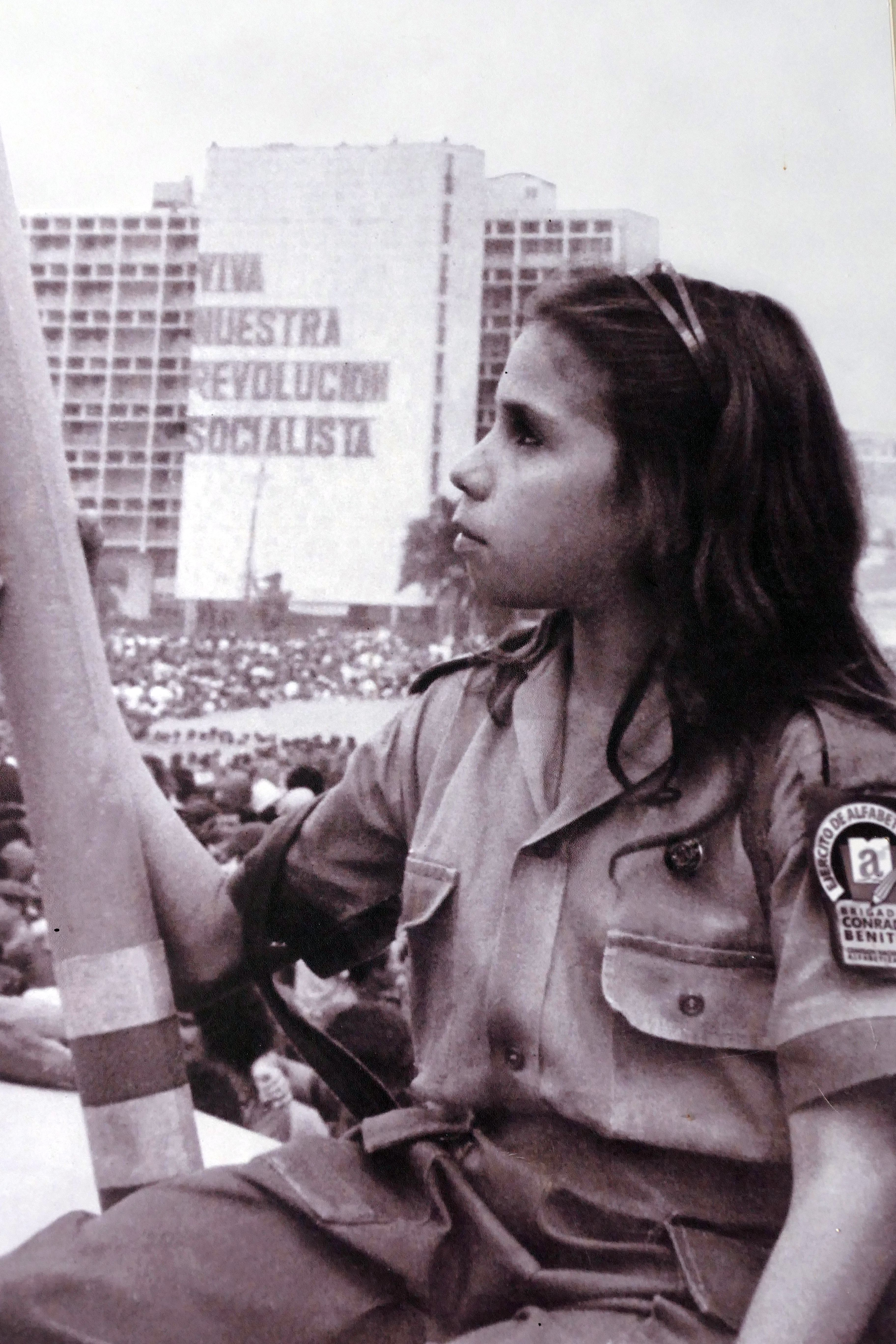
Young literacy brigadista in Havana, 1961

In April the country began a massive eight-month long effort to abolish illiteracy in Cuba. It began in April 1961 and ended on December 22, 1961, successfully raising Cuba's literacy rate to nearly one-hundred percent.

Supporters of the revolution who were too young or otherwise unable to participate in the downfall of Fulgencio Batista saw the campaign as an opportunity to contribute to the success of the new government and hoped to instill a revolutionary consciousness in their students. Educators became a militarized profession during the Cuban Literacy Campaign. Castro himself claimed in a speech given in May 1961, that the Cuban Revolution had two armies, the militias commonly associated with the revolution, and his "army of literacy teachers" or alfabetizadores who were responsible for waging war against illiteracy.

Some parents who were fearful of their children being put under military supervision and made to leave their homes to teach, had their children leave Cuba through Operation Peter Pan.

=== P.M. affair ===
After a brief period of artistic optimism beginning in 1959, where exiled artists returned to Cuba, the banning of the film P.M., in 1960, triggered a slow wave of emigration of Cuban filmmakers, who grew more frustrated with growing censorship in Cuba. The banning of the film P.M. was not a lone act of censorship which caused pessimism among filmmakers, instead, the censorship of P.M. was viewed to exemplify a growing atmosphere of artistic overwatch.

The debates that followed the banning of P.M. among film critics, caused the intervention of Fidel Castro, who met with the contesting writers and delivered his famed "Words to the Intellectuals" speech.

In "Word to the Intellectuals", delivered June 1961, Castro stated:

This means that within the Revolution, everything goes; against the Revolution, nothing. Nothing against the Revolution, because the Revolution has its rights also, and the first right of the Revolution is the right to exist, and no one can stand against the right of the Revolution to be and to exist, No one can rightfully claim a right against the Revolution. Since it takes in the interests of the people and Signifies the interests of the entire nation.

While Castro's proclamation was vague in defining to who was considered loyal to "the revolution", Castro also later defined in his speech, a need for the National Cultural Council to direct artistic affairs in Cuba, and for the National Union of Writers and Artists of Cuba to publish literary debate magazines.

=== Integrated Revolutionary Organizations ===
By July 1961, Castro was inspired by Soviet pressure, to create a ruling party for Cuba. Up until that point the provisional government was mostly managed by veterans of the Cuban Revolution without a party. The Integrated Revolutionary Organizations was formed in July, as a merger of the 26th of July Movement, the Revolutionary Directorate of 13 March Movement, and the Popular Socialist Party. Of the three organizations, the 26th of July Movement, and the Revolutionary Directorate, were inactive at the time of the merger. The PSP was the only group still active.

Anibal Escalante was placed in charge of staffing the organization. Since he was a leader of the PSP, he placed PSP members in important positions of authority. The IRO had a complete legal monopoly over public communication and screening candidates.

=== Four Year Plan ===
In 1960, Guevara began promoting an idea of rapidly industrializing Cuba, and diversifying Cuba's agriculture. In 1961, Guevara proposed a four-year plan for rapid industrialization that would create a 15% annual growth rate, and a tenfold increase in the production of fruits. As head of the Ministry of Industries, Guevara announced on the radio program People's University on March 3, 1961, that "accelerated industrialization" would require the centralization of all economic decision making.

In 1961, various Marxist economists from throughout the world were invited to Cuba to assist in economic planning. The central planning board of Cuba: JUCEPLAN, was tasked with creating a four-year economic plan. Regino Boti, the head of JUCEPLAN, announced in August 1961, that the country would soon have a 10% rate of economic growth. The plan drafted by JUCEPLAN in 1961, was a four-year plan devised to be implemented in 1962 through 1965.

The plan supposed that Cuba could quickly deemphasize the importance of sugar cultivation in its economy, and instead become a diverse industrial economy. According to Guevara, through the nationalization of industries, and a strong moral enthusiasm for labor taught to the working class, Cuba could rapidly industrialize.

=== Night of the Three Ps ===
The Night of the Three Ps (Spanish: La Noche de las Tres Pes) occurred on October 11, 1961, in Havana which was a massive police raid targeting prostitutes, pimps, and "pájaros" (term coined in Cuba to refer to homosexuals). Cuban poet Virgilio Piñera was arrested the morning after the raid but quickly released to avoid international scandal. The raid was the first moralist round up of the new Castro government and would be the beginning of various round-ups in Cuba of people considered undesirables. The raid took place at a time of heightened moral campaigns in Cuba demonizing homosexuality and other qualities considered uncompatible with the Cuban revolutionary "new man". The raid of the Night of the Three Ps officially targeted prostitutes (Spanish: prostitutas), "pájaros", and pimps (Spanish: proxenetas). Scholars and observers have noted that the police raid making the Night of the Three Ps could be better understood as having taken place for longer than that one night. Carlos Franqui noted in his memoir that the real targets of the raid included homosexuals, intellectuals, artists, vagrants, voodoo practitioners, and anyone deemed suspicious.

=== Marxist-Leninist turn ===
Although the USSR was hesitant regarding Castro's embrace of socialism, relations with the Soviets deepened. Castro sent Fidelito for a Moscow schooling and while the first Soviet technicians arrived in June Castro was awarded the Lenin Peace Prize. On December 2, 1961, Castro proclaimed on national television that he was a Marxist-Leninist, stating:

I am a Marxist-Leninist, and I shall be a Marxist-Leninist to the end of my life.

In Castro's Second Declaration of Havana he called on Latin America to rise up in revolution. In response, the U.S. successfully pushed the Organization of American States to expel Cuba; the Soviets privately reprimanded Castro for recklessness, although he received praise from China. Despite their ideological affinity with China, in the Sino-Soviet split, Cuba allied with the wealthier Soviets, who offered economic and military aid.

=== Declining relations with Latin America ===
Relations between Cuba and other Latin American states had begun declining by 1961, often due to a distaste for soviet influence in Cuba or worries of an antidemocratic turn in Cuban government.

In November 1961, Venezuelan President Betancourt, of the progressive Democratic Action Party, installed the Betancourt Doctrine, which demanded Venezuela not have ties with governments that had come to power by non-electoral means. Soon after, Venezuela broke all relations with Cuba.

Following the failed Bay of Pigs Invasion, the U.S. suggested that Columbia call a new meeting of OAS representatives in Punta del Este, Uruguay, in December 1961, to exclude Cuba from the Organization. On December 6, Fidel Castro made a speech condemning Colombia, and three days later Columbian President Lleras broke off relations with Cuba.

== 1962: "Year of Planning" ==
=== Economic decline ===
Historian Jorge I. Domínguez claims that throughout 1960 to 1962, there was no discussion within the Cuban government about altering the four year economic plan for accelerated industrialization. It wasn't until after the sharp decline in sugar production during the 1962 harvest, that ministers began recognizing the plan's failure, and began considering reform. In March 1962, Guevara admitted in a speech that the economic plan was a failure, specifically stating it was "an absurd plan, disconnected from reality, with absurd goals and imaginary resources."

Scholar Richard Legé Harris has contested that the demise of the economic plan was the result of a lack of machinery which was typically imported from the United States, but was prevented from being imported due to the embargo, as well as a lack of educated technicians.

The failure of the industrialization plan had immediate impacts by 1962. In that year, Cuba introduced a rationing system for food, and froze prices. A new currency was also introduced, which tangentially made all financial savings in the old currency worthless overnight.

=== Escalante affair ===
The economic decline and food rationing in Cuba resulted in protests in Cárdenas. Security reports indicated that many Cubans associated austerity with the "Old Communists" of the PSP, while Castro considered a number of them – namely Aníbal Escalante and Blas Roca – unduly loyal to Moscow. In March 1962 Castro removed the most prominent "Old Communists" from office, labelling them "sectarian". On a personal level, Castro was increasingly lonely, and his relations with Che Guevara became strained as the latter became increasingly anti-Soviet and pro-Chinese.

On 26 March 1962, the IRO became the United Party of the Cuban Socialist Revolution (PURSC) which, in turn, became the modern Communist Party of Cuba on 3 October 1965, with Castro as First Secretary. Castro remained the ruler of Cuba, first as Prime Minister and, from 1976, as President, until his retirement on February 20, 2008. His brother Raúl officially replaced him as president later that same month.

=== Cuban Missile Crisis ===
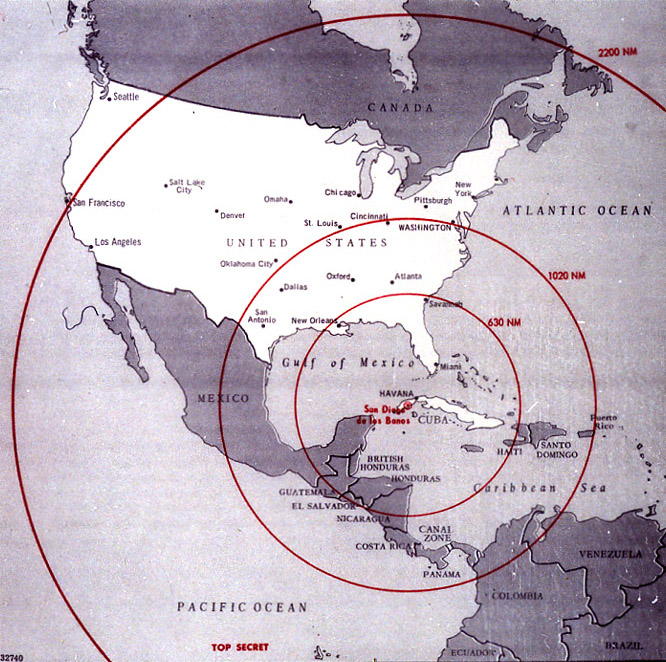
Reported range of nuclear missiles in Cuba during the Cuban Missile Crisis

Militarily weaker than NATO, Khrushchev wanted to install Soviet R-12 MRBM nuclear missiles on Cuba to even the power balance. Although conflicted, Castro agreed, believing it would guarantee Cuba's safety and enhance the cause of socialism. Undertaken in secrecy, only the Castro brothers, Guevara, Dorticós and security chief Ramiro Valdés knew the full plan.

Upon discovering it through aerial reconnaissance, in October the U.S. implemented an island-wide quarantine to search vessels headed to Cuba, sparking the Cuban Missile Crisis. The U.S. saw the missiles as offensive, though Castro insisted they were defensive. Castro urged Khrushchev to threaten a nuclear strike on the U.S. should Cuba be attacked, but Khrushchev was desperate to avoid nuclear war. Castro was left out of the negotiations, in which Khrushchev agreed to remove the missiles in exchange for a U.S. commitment not to invade Cuba and an understanding that the U.S. would remove their MRBMs from Turkey and Italy.

Feeling betrayed by Khrushchev, Castro was furious and soon fell ill. Proposing a five-point plan, Castro demanded that the U.S. end its embargo, cease supporting dissidents, stop violating Cuban air space and territorial waters and withdraw from Guantanamo Bay Naval Base. Presenting these demands to U Thant, visiting Secretary-General of the United Nations, the U.S. ignored them, and in turn Castro refused to allow the U.N.'s inspection team into Cuba.

== Aftermath ==
=== Economic planning ===
In 1962 Fidel Castro invited Marxist economists around the world to debate two main propositions. One proposition proposed by Che Guevara was that Cuba could bypass any capitalist then "socialist" transition period and immediately become an industrialized "communist" society if "subjective conditions" like public consciousness and vanguard action are perfected. The other proposition held by the Popular Socialist Party was that Cuba required a transitionary period as a mixed economy in which Cuba's sugar economy was maximized for profit before a "communist" society could be established. Eventually Fidel Castro would implement ideas of both and use the moral incentives proposed by Guevara but also focusing on developing the sugar economy rather than industrialization.

Cuba then began what was referred to as the "radical experiment", where the country was to be reorganized to promote revolutionary consciousness and an independent economy. Rural to urban migration was regulated, excess urban workers were sent to the countryside, and agricultural labor became common for students, soldiers, and convicts. The Military Units to Aid Production were established and used "anti-social" prisoners as penal laborers in agriculture. In September 1966, Fidel Castro gave a speech to representatives of the Committees for the Defense of the Revolution. In the speech, he gave his ruling that workers would no longer receive material bonuses for extra labor and instead be encouraged by "moral enthusiasm" alone, which distanced Cuba from the Soviet model of using material incentives. This independent approach to economic policy fell into a global trend during the Cold War in which Third World countries adopted independent economic strategies in relation to the industrialized dominant power blocs.

In February 1968, a group in the Communist Party of Cuba and other official organizations known as the "microfaction" was completely purged from the government. The group numbered almost forty officials who endorsed Soviet-style material incentives over moral enthusiasm to encourage workers. They were accused of conspiring against the state, and made to serve prison sentences.

In 1968, Castro announced a "Revolutionary Offensive" to completely nationalize all remaining private businesses. The effort was modeled after China's Great Leap Forward and aimed at restructuring society with the sole aim of harvesting sugarcane for the 1970 zafra.

=== Further emigration ===
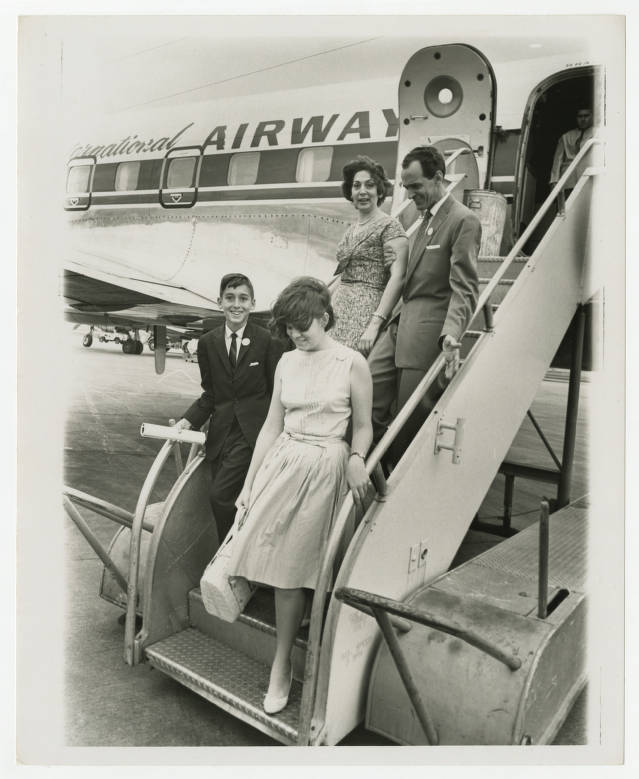
Cuban refugees exit a Freedom Flight at Miami Airport

On 28 September 1965, Fidel Castro announced that Cubans wishing to emigrate could do so beginning 10 October from the Cuban port of Camarioca. The administration of U.S. President Johnson tried to control the numbers it would admit to the U.S. and set some parameters for their qualifications, preferring those claiming political persecution and those with family members in the U.S. In negotiations with the Cuban government it set a target of 3,000 to 4,000 people to be transported by air. Despite those diplomatic discussions, Cuban Americans brought small leisure boats from the United States to Camarioca. In the resulting Camarioca boatlift, about 160 boats transported about 5,000 refugees to Key West for immigration processing by U.S. officials. The Johnson administration made only modest efforts to enforce restrictions on this boat traffic. Castro closed the port with little notice on 15 November, stranding thousands. On 6 November, the Cuban and U.S. governments agreed on the details on an emigration airlift based on family reunification and without reference to those the U.S. characterized as political prisoners and whom the Cubans termed counter-revolutionaries. To deal with the crowds at Camarioca, the U.S. added a maritime component to the airborne evacuation. Both forms of transport started operating on 1 December.

From December 1965 to early 1973, under the Johnson and Nixon administrations, twice daily "Freedom Flights" (Vuelos de la Libertad) transported émigrés from Varadero Beach to Miami. The longest airlift of political refugees, it transported 265,297 Cubans to the United States with the help of religious and volunteer agencies. Flights were limited to immediate relatives and Cubans already in the United States with a waiting period anywhere from one to two years.

Many who came through Camarioca and the Freedom Flights were much more racially diverse, of lower economic standing, and of more women compared to earlier emigration waves. This is mainly due to Castro's restriction not allowing skilled laborers to leave the country.

=== International relations ===
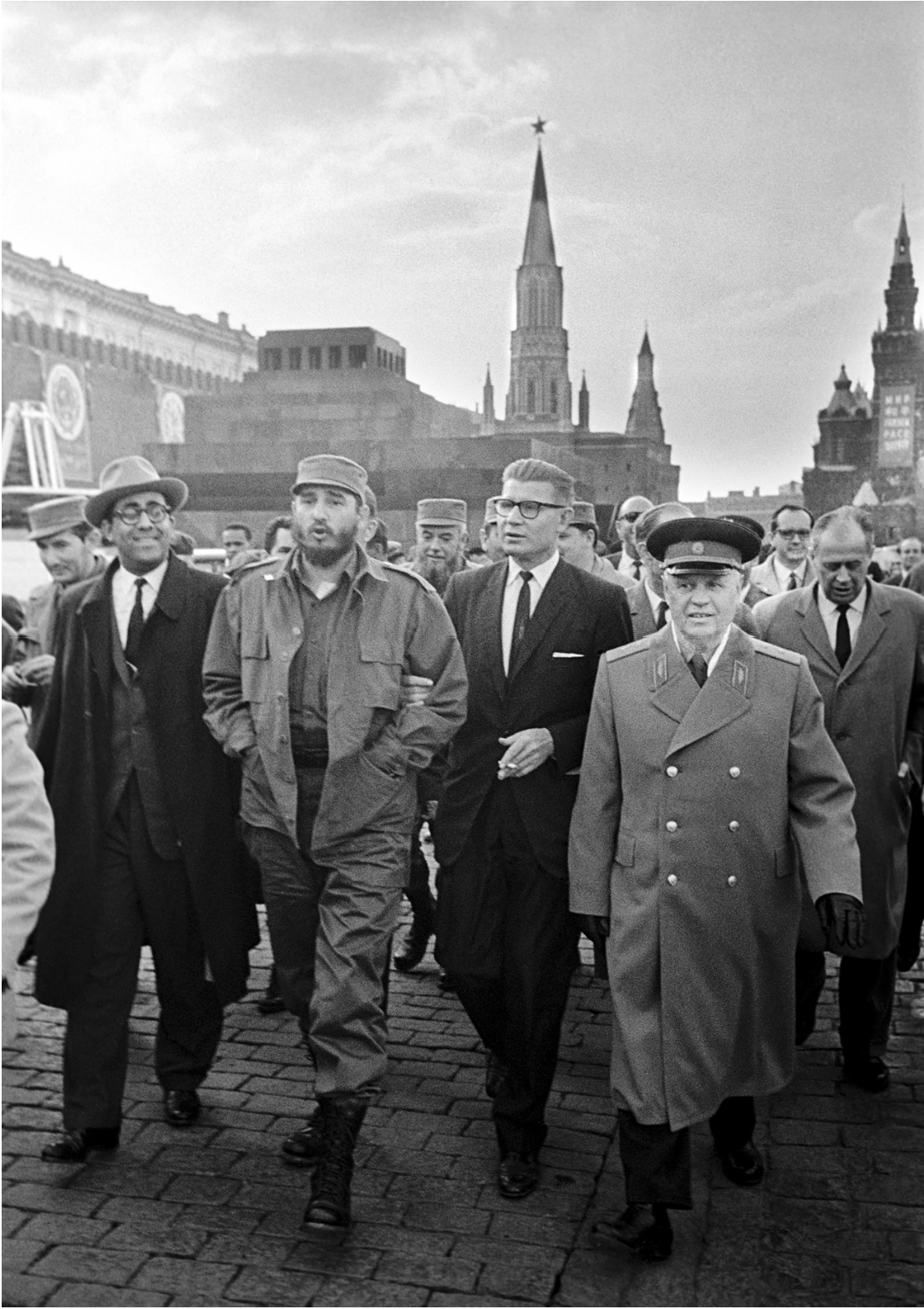
Fidel Castro visiting Red Square (1963)

"The greatest threat presented by Castro's Cuba is as an example to other Latin American states which are beset by poverty, corruption, feudalism, and plutocratic exploitation ... his influence in Latin America might be overwhelming and irresistible if, with Soviet help, he could establish in Cuba a Communist utopia."

— Walter Lippmann, Newsweek, April 27, 1964

In February 1963, Castro received a personal letter from Khrushchev, inviting him to visit the USSR. Deeply touched, Castro arrived in April and stayed for five weeks. He visited 14 cities, addressed a Red Square rally and watched the May Day parade from the Kremlin, was awarded an honorary doctorate from Moscow State University and became the first foreigner to receive the Order of Lenin. Castro returned to Cuba with new ideas; inspired by Soviet newspaper Pravda, he amalgamated Hoy and Revolución into a new daily, Granma, and oversaw large investment into Cuban sport that resulted in an increased international sporting reputation. The government agreed to temporarily permit emigration for anyone other than males aged between 15 and 26, thereby ridding the government of thousands of opponents. In 1963, his mother died. This was the last time his private life was reported in Cuba's press. In 1964, Castro returned to Moscow, officially to sign a new five-year sugar trade agreement, but also to discuss the ramifications of the assassination of John F. Kennedy.

Despite Soviet misgivings, Castro continued calling for global revolution and the funding militant leftists. He supported Che Guevara's "Andean project", an unsuccessful plan to set up a guerrilla movement in the highlands of Bolivia, Peru and Argentina, and allowed revolutionary groups from across the world, from the Viet Cong to the Black Panthers, to train in Cuba. He considered western-dominated Africa ripe for revolution, and sent troops and medics to aid Ahmed Ben Bella's socialist regime in Algeria during the Sand War. He also allied with Alphonse Massemba-Débat's socialist government in Congo-Brazzaville. In 1965, Castro authorized Guevara to travel to Congo-Kinshasa to train revolutionaries against the western-backed government. Castro was personally devastated when Guevara was subsequently killed by CIA-backed troops in Bolivia in October 1967 and publicly attributed it to Che's disregard for his own safety. In 1966, Castro staged a Tri-Continental Conference of Africa, Asia and Latin America in Havana, further establishing himself as a significant player on the world stage. From this conference, Castro created the Latin American Solidarity Organization (OLAS), which adopted the slogan of "The duty of a revolution is to make revolution", signifying that Havana's leadership of the Latin American revolutionary movement.

Castro's increasing role on the world stage strained his relationship with the Soviets, now under the leadership of Leonid Brezhnev. Asserting Cuba's independence, Castro refused to sign the Treaty on the Non-Proliferation of Nuclear Weapons, declaring it a Soviet-U.S. attempt to dominate the Third World. In turn, Soviet-loyalist Aníbal Escalante began organizing a government network of opposition to Castro, though in January 1968, he and his supporters were arrested for passing state secrets to Moscow. Castro ultimately relented to Brezhnev's pressure to be obedient, and in August 1968 denounced the Prague Spring as led by a "fascist reactionary rabble" and praised the Soviet invasion of Czechoslovakia.

=== One-party state ===
In October 1965, the Integrated Revolutionary Organizations was officially renamed the "Cuban Communist Party" and published the membership of its Central Committee. Cuba was officially a one-party state after a long period of political solidification by Fidel Castro.

The first official congress of the Communist Party of Cuba was conducted years later in December 1975. In 1976, a new constitution was also approved. The constitution was modeled off the Soviet system, and introduced the National Assembly of People's Power as the institution of indirect representation in government. Cuba had no constitutional government for 16 years. The adoption of the 1976 constitution finally ended the period of provisional non-constitutional government which started after the Cuban Revolution.

=== Tourism and gambling ===
The growth of tourist industries outside of Cuba is greatly due to the fall of the tourism industry within Cuba, majorly caused by the United States embargo against Cuba which imposed a travel ban and a prohibition on foreign investment. The rapid reduction of tourism to Cuba was so drastic that as of 1953, Cuba received half of all tourist arrivals to the Caribbean, but by 1980, Cuba only received 3% of all arrivals. While in 1958, 90% of tourists in Cuba were Americans, after the travel ban, that 90% could no longer visit. It originally was very difficult for Cuba to cater to non-American tourists, as many Northern Europeans who could travel to Cuba, did not want to take a long plane ride to the Caribbean for sunny beaches, and preferred the closer Mediterranean.

As Cuban casinos were closed, the Bahamas became the new gambling hub of the Caribbean. Bahamian politician Stafford Sands quickly capitalized on the gambling vacuum in the Caribbean by proposing the construction of Casinos in the Bahamas throughout the early 1960s. Sands was approached by Meyer Lansky to develop casinos together, but rebuked the offer, instead collaborating with Wallace Groves and Louis Chesler.

== Historiography ==
=== State rhetoric ===
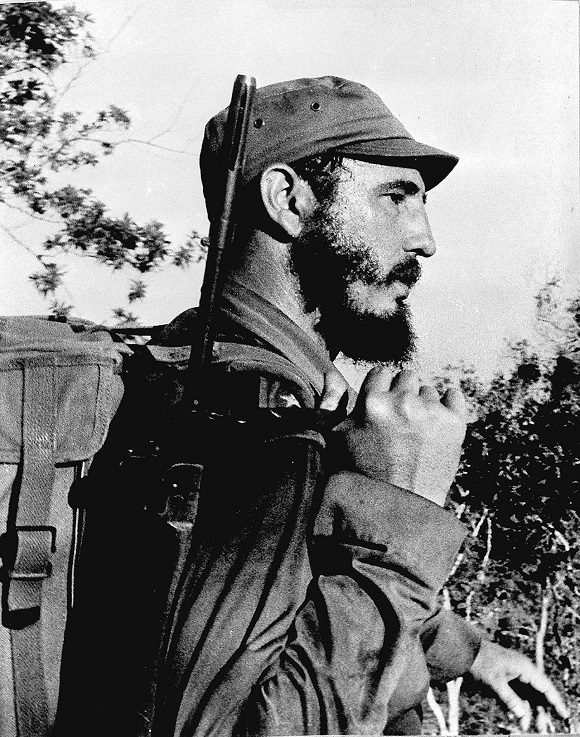
Fidel Castro posing as a guerrilla in 1962, during the anniversary of the Triumph of the Revolution, to commemorate his own past guerrilla struggle.

The ideology and rhetoric used to justify Cuban policy changes during this period has been a point of significance for scholars. Historian Antoni Kapcia claims that the rhetoric of the Cuban state that developed during this period is best described as "guerrillerismo", and is a style of rhetoric that praised selflessness, and considered Cubans to be citizen-soldiers, whose participation in government projects was considered a part of the same guerrilla struggle that the Cuban Revolution birthed. Historian Anna Clayfield has posited that guerrillerismo continued after the Revolutionary Offensive, and the Sovietization of Cuba, never completely leaving Cuban politics.

=== Political turn ===
The political turn Castro experienced, and the Cuban government undertook, from 1959 to 1962, has been a point of debate amongst scholars. There are various theories as to what exactly motivated Castro, and Cuban officials, to radicalize their political beliefs.

In the immediate aftermath of the Cuban Revolution and Fidel Castro's consolidation of power, a historical interpretation developed, known as the "betrayal thesis". This thesis heralded the original struggle against Batista, and considered the revolution's democratic aims to be endearing, but Castro's rise to power is considered a "betrayal" of the original revolution. This thesis was propagated by Cuban exile organizations such as the Cuban Democratic Revolutionary Front, and the Cuban Revolutionary Council. The thesis was also famously propagated by anti-Stalinist historian Theodore Draper.

In regards to the cause of Castro's political turn, the biographer of Fidel Castro: Tad Szulc, has claimed that Fidel Castro entered into a secret agreement with the Popular Socialist Party in 1958, to turn Cuba communist after the Cuban Revolution. Historian Samuel Farber has criticized this idea of a long-term communist conspiracy, noting that Fidel Castro and the PSP were often at odds in early 1959, and no PSP documents at the time refer to Castro as like-minded. Farber admits that Castro's political proclamations were often opportunistic, but that does not indicate a long term conspiracy. Castro's embrace of Cuban communists came after the summer of 1959.

=== Society ===
The period of political consolidation between 1959 and 1962, has been considered the beginning of the "militarization of Cuba", which lasted from 1959 to 1970, and climaxed with the Revolutionary Offensive, that was organized by the Cuban Revolutionary Armed Forces. A chief proponent of the "militarization" periodization is historian Irving Louis Horowitz, who argues the militant origins of the revolution, the popularity of militarism in Latin America, Cuba's single-crop economy, desires to resist U.S. hostility, military support of regimes abroad, and Cuba's role as the USSR's lone ally in the Americas caused the militarization of Cuba.

Another historiographical interpretation is that the political system that developed during the political consolidation of 1959–1962, was a "grassroots dictatorship". This label was developed by historian Lillian Guerra, and is used to describe how citizens themselves participated in the removal of liberal rights, and the mass deputization of citizens by the government, to act as citizen spies in the Committees for the Defense of the Revolution.
