= Grassroots dictatorship =

Term describing Cuba's political structure

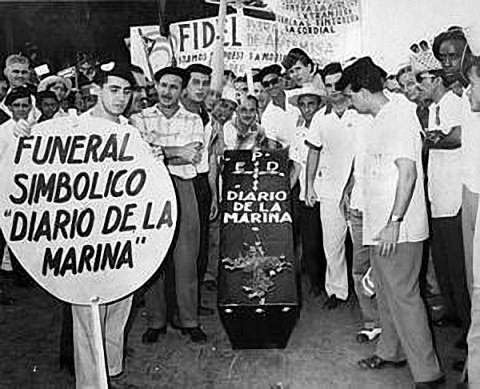
Mock funeral for a newspaper. (Cuba, 1960) The mass celebration of press censorship is a key element of the "grassroots dictatorship" concept.

The concept of a grassroots dictatorship was created by historian Lillian Guerra to describe her understanding of the unique political structure of Cuba. According to Guerra, Cuba is a "grassroots dictatorship", because of its mass deputization of citizens as spies, to gather intelligence on neighbors' "subversive" activities, and generally collaborate with government initiatives. This mass deputization is carried out by the Committees for the Defense of the Revolution (CDR) who organize citizens to carry out "acts of repudiation" against other citizens who are considered subversive. These "acts of repudiation" often involve the gathering of deputized citizens to taunt or assault targeted "subversive" citizens. Through the mass deputization of citizens via CDRs, Guerra argues that the Cuban government is able to suppress public speech, and maintain a sense of "grassroots" support, despite what Guerra calls: the "undemocratic nature of the Cuban government."

The historian Anne Luke has criticized the model as too limited in its description of Cuban political culture in the 1960s.

== Concept ==
=== Historiography ===
The concept of a "grassroots dictatorship" is utilized by Guerra to make a certain historiographic argument regarding the Cuban Revolution and the development of the post-revolutionary government. Various historians before Guerra have argued as to what exactly caused Fidel Castro's political consolidation after 1959. Guerra presents an argument that synthesizes both "from above" and "from below" models. According to Guerra's model, political consolidation did not exclusively arise from the long-term plans of the Castro brothers (the "from above" model) or from political pressure and ideological dedication from the Cuban masses (the "from below" model). Instead, Guerra posits that political consolidation in Cuba arose from a collaboration between political officials and the general masses. This collaboration is what makes the "grassroots" character of the "grassroots dictatorship".

The history of the "grassroots dictatorship" in Cuba, as posited by Guerra, begins with popular support for early reforms after 1959. However, as some sectors of the population benefited from these early reforms, Cuba began facing external opposition from the United States. International troubles resulted in a singular focus on national security in Cuba, and a veneration of Fidel Castro. In the interests of "national security", restrictions on the press were enacted, mass celebrations of Fidelismo were conducted, and eventually citizens were deputization into the Committees for the Defense of the Revolution to spy on and expose "traitors". A very narrow definition of national loyalty was developed, and repressive structures were designed to enshrine this loyalty against a supposed threat of U.S. invasion. According to Guerra, Cuban citizens did not resist new repressive measures because they were seen as the best method to avoid invasion.

Guerra also alleges that the national security dogma of Cuba in the 1960s was reflected in the writings of foreign visitors to Cuba, most exemplary in Margaret Randall, who refused to compare Cuba to dictatorships, or even the Soviet Union, because it apparently had a unique need for national security.

=== Political system and ideology ===
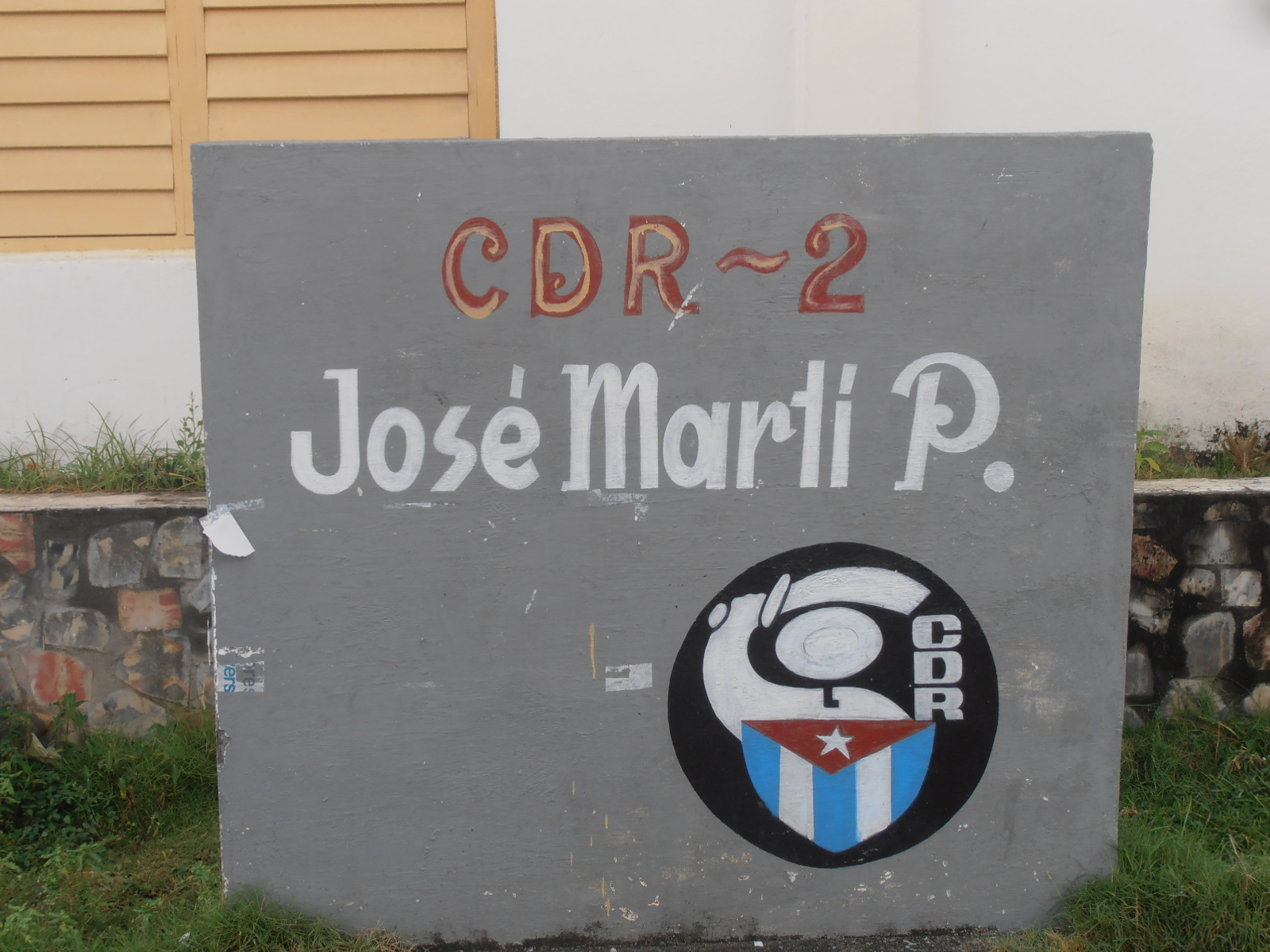
Placard for a local CDR office in Baracoa, Cuba.

As described by Guerra, the grassroots dictatorship is best exemplified in the Committees for the Defense of the Revolution, who deputize citizens to gather intelligence on the "subversive" thoughts and actions of neighbors. The "grassroots dictatorship" also constitutes the total nationalization of civil society groups, including trade unions, making all spaces for public speech monitored by government officials. The use of mob violence, termed "acts of repudiation", is also a feature of the grassroots dictatorship; these acts usually target people who are somehow deemed a threat to national security.

The ideology used to justify this system of mass deputization and monitoring is the eventual promise of socialism, something akin to a "millenarian" expectation, according to Guerra. Historian John Gronbeck has expanded on Guerra's reasoning and argued that the promise of socialism also developed into a sense of Cuban exceptionalism, in that Cuba is on a unique path to socialism, thus justifying government actions. Cuban exceptionalism is argued to be a justification for mass repression in Cuba, since it is supposedly part of Cuba's uniquely dire need for national defense against invasion.

== Criticism of Guerra's model ==
Historian Anne Luke has argued that Guerra's model of a grassroots dictatorship is too limited in explaining the political culture of Cuba. Luke posits that the Cuban citizenry were not so totally entrenched into a monolithic reverence for Fidelismo and national security. Instead, Cuban society has always been much more ideologically plural, to the detriment of government efforts to popularize and mandate a reverence for Fidelismo. Luke references the print culture in Cuba in the 1960s, as evidence of such a plurality against monolithic Fidelismo.

== See also ==
- Deformed workers' state
- Grassroots – Movement based on local communities
- Illiberal democracy
- Totalitarianism
- Inverted totalitarianism – Political theory about illiberal democracies
