= San Juan Hill (disambiguation) =

San Juan Hill can refer to:

- San Juan Hill, Manhattan, an African American community in the New York City area now known as Lincoln Square, Manhattan
- San Juan Hill, a landform in Santiago de Cuba, Cuba
  - The Battle of San Juan Hill, a battle of the Spanish–American War
