= Proclamation Against Discrimination =

Effort to eliminate racial discrimination in Cuba after the Cuban Revolution

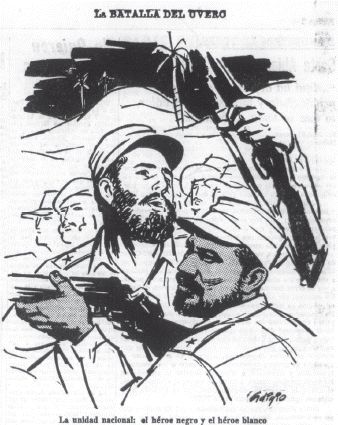
Image of Fidel Castro and Juan Almeida Bosque, promoting interracial unity, published in Noticias de hoy in 1959. Bottom sentence translates as "National unity: the white hero, the black hero".

The Proclamation Against Discrimination was a retroactively-titled speech given by Fidel Castro on March 23, 1959, that outlined the need for a "battle against racial discrimination" in Cuban society. The following campaign resulted in a series of laws drafted in 1959 and 1960, outlawing the remaining legal forms of racial segregation in Cuba. This was done by desegregating beaches, parks, and abolishing private social clubs, and private schools.

The campaign came to an end with the public mourning of black literacy workers killed during the 1961 Cuban literacy campaign. Cuban officials began to allude that racism had been eradicated from Cuban society, as evidenced by the equal participation of black literacy workers in the literacy campaign, and the national mourning of black martyrs.

== Background ==
=== Racial segregation in Cuba ===
Since the independence of Cuba in 1902, the Cuban constitution outlawed racial discrimination in public facilities and in businesses. From 1902 to 1933, there were various Afro-Cubans who served as president of the country, chief of the armed forces, and president of the senate. Despite wide-ranging participation in society, it was common for Cuban social clubs to openly restrict their membership by race. During the first presidency of Fulgencio Batista (1940-1944), Batista himself was rejected from membership in the Havana Yacht Club for being mixed-race.

During the Batistato government (1952-1958), informal racial segregation was common in Cuban society. Black and white Cubans often lived in different neighborhoods, and black and white Cubans often walked in different sections of public parks. During his rule, Batista donated $500,000 to black social clubs so they could build their own recreational facilities, and purchase their own private beaches; rather than outright outlaw segregated recreational clubs.

=== Race in the Cuban Revolution ===
Racism was a common element within discourse opposing Fulgencio Batista. President Batista was himself mixed-race, and for this reason, disparaging caricatures developed of Batista as el mono ("the monkey"), or el negro ("the black"). Within the 26th of July Movement fighting against Batista, there were few discussions about the politics of race in Cuba, and there were no declarations made about ending discrimination after the overthrow of Batista.

Historian Samuel Farber contends that evidence for mass black support for Batista is sparse, and is doubtful especially considering the suppression of labor unions by Batista which lost him general working class support. However, Farber claims white predominance in the opposition movement is well evidenced.

== History ==
=== Announcement ===
On March 23, at a Havana labor rally, Fidel Castro gave a speech detailing his thoughts on the direction of Cuba after the Triumph of the Revolution. In the speech he lamented on the major goals of the new government; he declared:

If the people want to see a correct course for themselves they must accept the postulates I was talking about. I told that battles must be won by us and in that order they must be won; the battle against unemployment; the battle to raise the standards of the lowest paid workers; the battle to bring down the cost of living; and one of the most just battles that must be fought, a battle that must be emphasized more and more, which I might call the fourth battle--the battle to end racial discrimination at work centers.

Castro continued the speech by promising the desegregate private beaches, but only the beaches. Private clubs would not be regulated by government mandates. He also claimed that an increase in black education would commence via the improvement of Cuban public schools. The declaration was a major policy shift for Castro, who until that point had spoken little of racism in Cuba, and had made no racially-minded policy changes. Outside of policy promises, Castro also promised in the speech to regularly denounce racists as a method of mass consciousness changing.

Days later, on March 25, Castro addressed the public again, only to "clarify" his earlier proclamation. He reminded the public that black and white citizens would not be forced to socialize, and that a law outlawing discrimination would be unnecessary.

=== Laws ===
In May 1959, Castro desegregated Cuban beaches by nationalizing the beaches which were a part of private recreational clubs. The clubs themselves were untouched by this law, and were still allowed to restrict membership by race. Public parks were also reconstructed so as not to have antiquated designs which were once used for racial segregation.

In April 1960, Castro finally nationalized all private clubs in general. This made it so that people of any race could enjoy the facilities once owned by private recreational clubs. Castro still declared that in regards to social integration, the government would still respect Cubans' "privacy". This nationalization of private clubs also integrated black social clubs such as the Club Atenas. In early 1960, to better racial diversity in job hiring, the Ministry of Labor took over the hiring process of all Cuban enterprises.

In September 1961, Castro nationalized all private schools and universities. Alongside urban reforms which moved slum-dwellers into new housing projects, and the launch of a literacy campaign in 1961, Afro-Cubans were gaining better housing conditions and education opportunities. Alongside these shifts, official declarations that racism had been "solved", began to be promoted.

=== P.M. affair ===
By 1961, there was a growing sentiment amongst Cuban officials that efforts to tackle racial discrimination were coming to a close, and discussions about racism were unnecessary. In the same year, the film P.M. was released, which focused on black characters enjoying Havana nightlife. The film was soon banned, and in Castro's June 1961 speech "Words to the Intellectuals", he declared that Cuba needed to ban material that questioned the revolution. Contemporary scholars still debate exactly why P.M. was banned; debating how much depictions of undisciplined and rowdy black characters contributed to the banning. However, after the censorship, Cuban intellectuals began debating how exactly to portray black characters in Cuban cinema.

=== Conclusion ===
In the February 1962, the Second Declaration of Havana was presented. In it, it was declared that Cuba had at that point eliminated racial discrimination. The declaration states:

Cuba, the Latin American nation which has made landowners of more than 100,000 small farmers, provided yearround employment on state farms and cooperatives to all agricultural workers, transformed forts into schools, given 70,000 scholarships to university, secondary, and technological students, created lecture halls for the entire child population, totally liquidated illiteracy, quadrupled medical services, nationalized foreign interests, suppressed the abusive system which turned housing into a means of exploiting people, virtually eliminated unemployment, suppressed discrimination due to race or sex, [...]

Following the declaration, there was an official silence regarding the matters of racism in Cuba. While it was still technically legal to discuss racism in Cuba, accusations of festering racism in government were often branded as "counter-revolutionary" speech, and thus became punishable. The elimination of black social clubs also ended organized efforts to tackle racism amongst private citizens.

== Effects ==
=== Silence on racism ===
Historian Lillian Guerra argues in her 2023 book Patriots and Traitors in Revolutionary Cuba, that while desegregation became law, the greater desegregation campaign barely addressed continuing anti-black prejudices amongst the Cuban population, and only repeated communist rhetoric regarding equality in hopes of reducing racism in popular belief. Cuban anti-racist activist Gisela Arandia has claimed that the 1962 Declaration of Havana, actually only hampered dialogues on continuing racial inequality, and proposals to mend this inequality.

After Black Panther leader Eldridge Cleaver fled from the United States to exile in Cuba in 1968, he frequently complained that the Cuban government was deeply suspicious of him and fellow Black Panthers, who were expected to denounce racism in the United States, but not to highlight racism in Cuba.
