= Sovietization of Cuba =

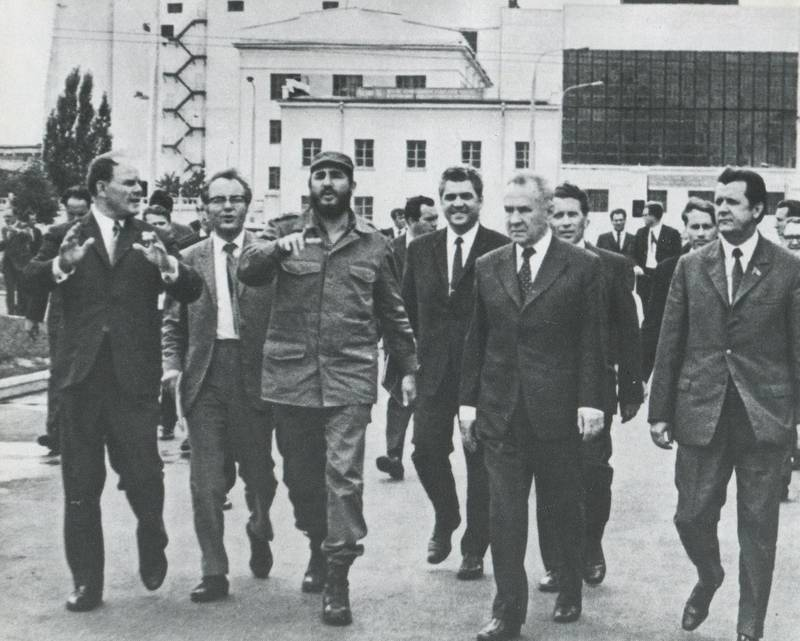
Fidel Castro visiting the Soviet Union in 1972.

The Sovietization of Cuba is a historiographical model proposed by scholars like political scientist Piero Gleijeses, and economist Carmelo Mesa-Lago. The sovietization thesis defines Cuba's political developments, and military actions, in the 1970s, completely in relation to the Soviet Union. The thesis proposes that Cuba's economic dependence on the Soviet Union, encouraged the Cuban government to model itself after the Soviet Union, and for the Cuban military to follow Soviet whims. According to Mesa-Lago, the sovietization of Cuba, reduced Cuba to a state subordinate to the Soviet Union, akin to how Batista's Cuba was subordinate to the United States.

== Background ==
=== Political consolidation in Cuba ===
In February 1960, Khrushchev sent his deputy, Anastas Mikoyan, to Cuba to discover what motivated Castro, who had returned from failed trip to Washington, DC, where he was refused a meeting with US president Dwight Eisenhower. According to reports, Khrushchev's aides had initially tried to characterize Castro as an untrustworthy American agent.

Washington's increasing economic embargo led Cuba to seek new markets in a hurry to avert economic disaster. Cuba and the Soviet Union signed their first trade deal in 1960, in which Cuba traded sugar to the Soviet Union in exchange for fuel.

To consolidate "Socialist Cuba", Castro united the MR-26-7, PSP and Revolutionary Directorate into a governing party based on the Leninist principle of democratic centralism: the Integrated Revolutionary Organizations (Organizaciones Revolucionarias Integradas – ORI), renamed the United Party of the Cuban Socialist Revolution (PURSC) in 1962. Although the USSR was hesitant regarding Castro's embrace of socialism, relations with the Soviets deepened. Castro sent Fidelito for a Moscow schooling, Soviet technicians arrived on the island, and Castro was awarded the Lenin Peace Prize. In December 1961, Castro admitted that he had been a Marxist–Leninist for years, and in his Second Declaration of Havana he called on Latin America to rise up in revolution. In response, the US successfully pushed the Organization of American States to expel Cuba; the Soviets privately reprimanded Castro for recklessness, although he received praise from China. Despite their ideological affinity with China, in the Sino-Soviet split, Cuba allied with the wealthier Soviets, who offered economic and military aid.

The ORI began shaping Cuba using the Soviet model, persecuting political opponents and perceived social deviants such as prostitutes and homosexuals; Castro considered same-sex sexual activity a bourgeois trait.

== Sovietization ==
=== Sovietization of culture ===
According to historian Lillian Guerra, the "Grey years" of the 1970s in Cuba, are a direct result of the sovietization of Cuba. Since Cuba was able to gain economic stability through soviet aid, Cuba was then able to focus on domestic culture, and on enforcing ideological conformity. Thus to Guerra, the era of tight censorship known as the "grey years" was a symptom of the wider sovietization of Cuba.

According to Aviva Chomsky, despite Sovietization, Cuban popular culture was more connected to American popular culture, than Soviet culture. This was caused by many Cubans family ties to relatives in the United States, and the fact that visiting Russians spoke a foreign language that Cubans were less familiar with compared to English.

=== Sovietization of the economy ===
Five years after the failed 1970 zafra, debates ignited within the government as to how the economy should be revitalized. By 1975, the System for Economic Management and Planning, was formed, and in 1976, the Organs of Peoples Power, was formed to conduct economic planning. The Organs of Peoples Power was directly modeled after soviet administrative systems.

Cuba also began undergoing small-scale privatization, and offering material-incentives for extra labor time, both policies were in line with Soviet economic policy. As the Cuban economy was organizing itself based on the Soviet model, the Soviet Union began to increase its aid money throughout the 1970s, and 1980s.

=== Sovietization of the military ===
The Cuban military began making administrative changes in 1973. The new training program allowed promising officers to take training programs in the Soviet Union. Throughout the 1970s and 1980s, the Cuban military engaged in various interventions throughout Africa. Despite the capability of the Cuban military, after the dissolution of the Soviet Union, the Cuban military cut its enlisted personal by two thirds.

== Criticism of Sovietization thesis ==
Historian Anna Clayfield argues that Soviet influence does not wholly explain the political developments in Cuba in the 1970s. Clayfield argues that the Cuban intervention in Angola represented a clear break from Soviet foreign policy, and the constant promotion of national poet Jose Marti in Cuban media, represented a distinctly Cuban approach to culture, meaning Cuban culture did not become completely sovietized.

== Sources ==
- Bourne, Peter G. (1986). Fidel: A Biography of Fidel Castro. New York City: Dodd, Mead & Company. ISBN 978-0-396-08518-8.
- Coltman, Leycester (2003). The Real Fidel Castro. New Haven and London: Yale University Press. ISBN 978-0-300-10760-9.
- Geyer, Georgie Anne (1991). Guerrilla Prince: The Untold Story of Fidel Castro. New York City: Little, Brown and Company. ISBN 978-0-316-30893-9.
- Quirk, Robert E. (1993). Fidel Castro. New York and London: W.W. Norton & Company. ISBN 978-0-393-03485-1.
