= San Juan Hill massacre =

1959 killings after the Cuban Revolution

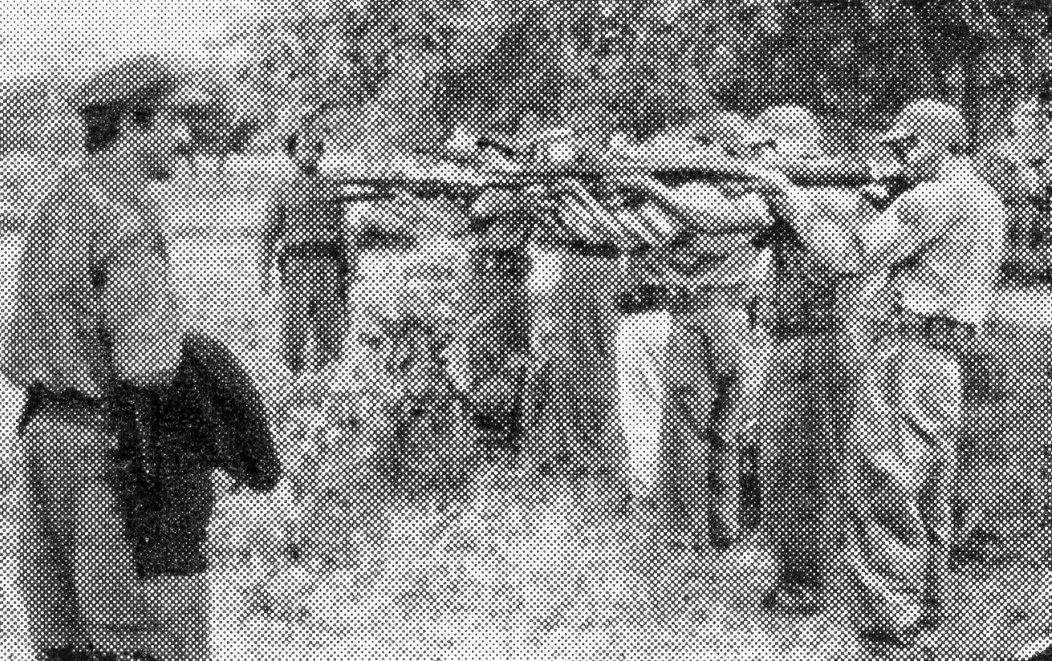
- Firing squad about to execute Lieutenant Enrique Despaigne Noret during the San Juan Hill massacre.
- Date: January 12, 1959
- Location: San Juan Hill, Santiago de Cuba
- Type: Massacre
- Motive: War crimes committed during the Cuban Revolution by Batista collaborators.
- Organized by: Raúl Castro
- Deaths: 71-73
- Burial: Mass grave

The San Juan Hill massacre or the Massacre of the 71 occurred on January 12, 1959 at San Juan Hill in Santiago de Cuba in the aftermath of the Cuban Revolution. 71 people accused of collaboration with the former regime of Fulgencio Batista were executed by firing squad after quick trials and buried in a mass grave.

== Background ==
After the final rebel victory in the Cuban Revolution on January 1, 1959, dozens of Fulgencio Batista's supporters and members of the armed forces and police were arrested and accused of war crimes and other abuses. According to Time magazine, many of the accused:

"were proved killers whose twisted minds drew pleasure from pain. To extract secrets from captured rebels, they yanked out fingernails, carbonized hands and feet in red-hot vises. Castration was a major police weapon...."

The 1940 Cuban constitution prohibited the death penalty, but that constitution had been recently overturned.

== Judgement ==
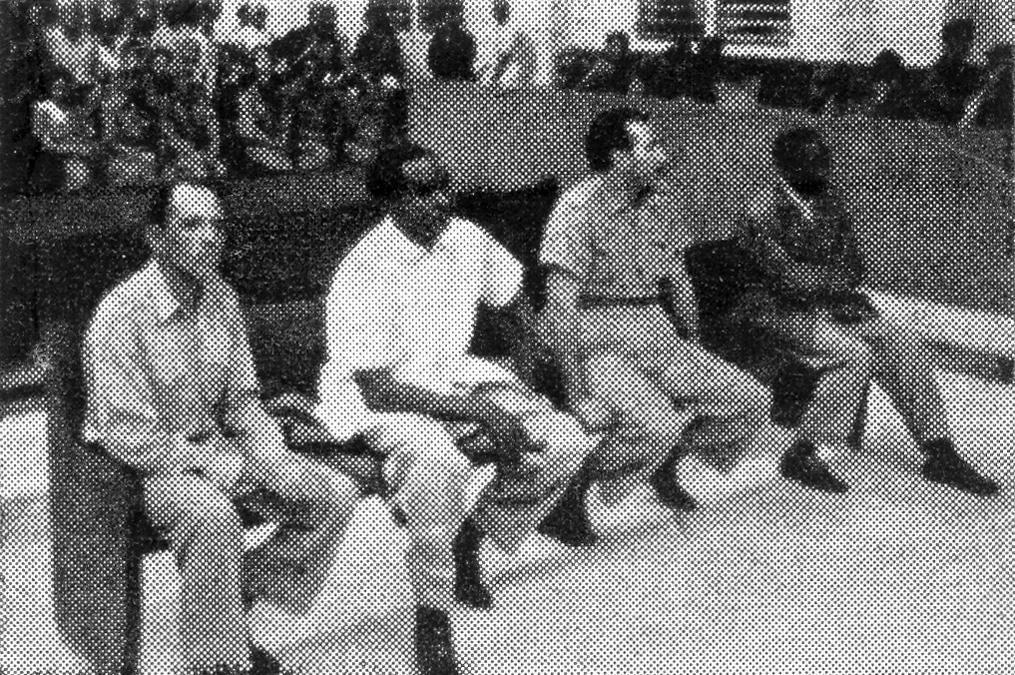
Trial of Enrique Despaigne Noret.

On January 11, a revolutionary court in Santiago de Cuba sentenced 4 individuals to death after a 4-hour summary trial at the rate of 4 minutes for each sentence. It was directed by Belarmino Castilla Mas, Jorge Serguera acted as prosecutor and took place without defense lawyers or evidence that would incriminate them in previous crimes.

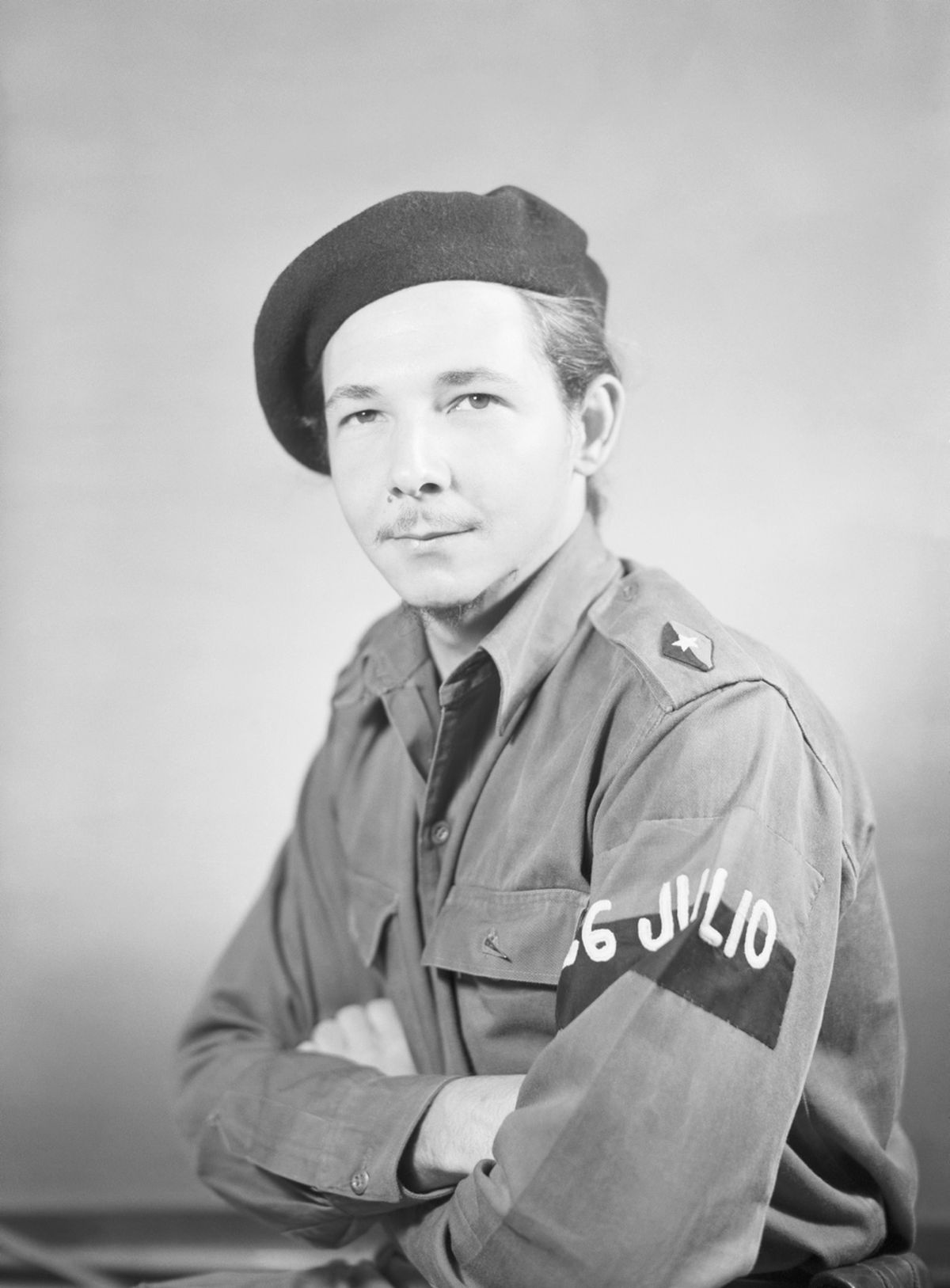
Raúl Castro in 1959.

The court was also presided over by Rebel Army Commander Raúl Castro, who was in command of the Oriente province. The Santiago rebels sentenced 68 more men to the death penalty, ten men were also sentenced to 10 years in prison and 47 were acquitted. Prisoners were taken from the Boniato prison in trucks to a shooting range at San Juan Hill, where a large crowd had gathered to cheer for the executions.

== Shootings and testimonies ==
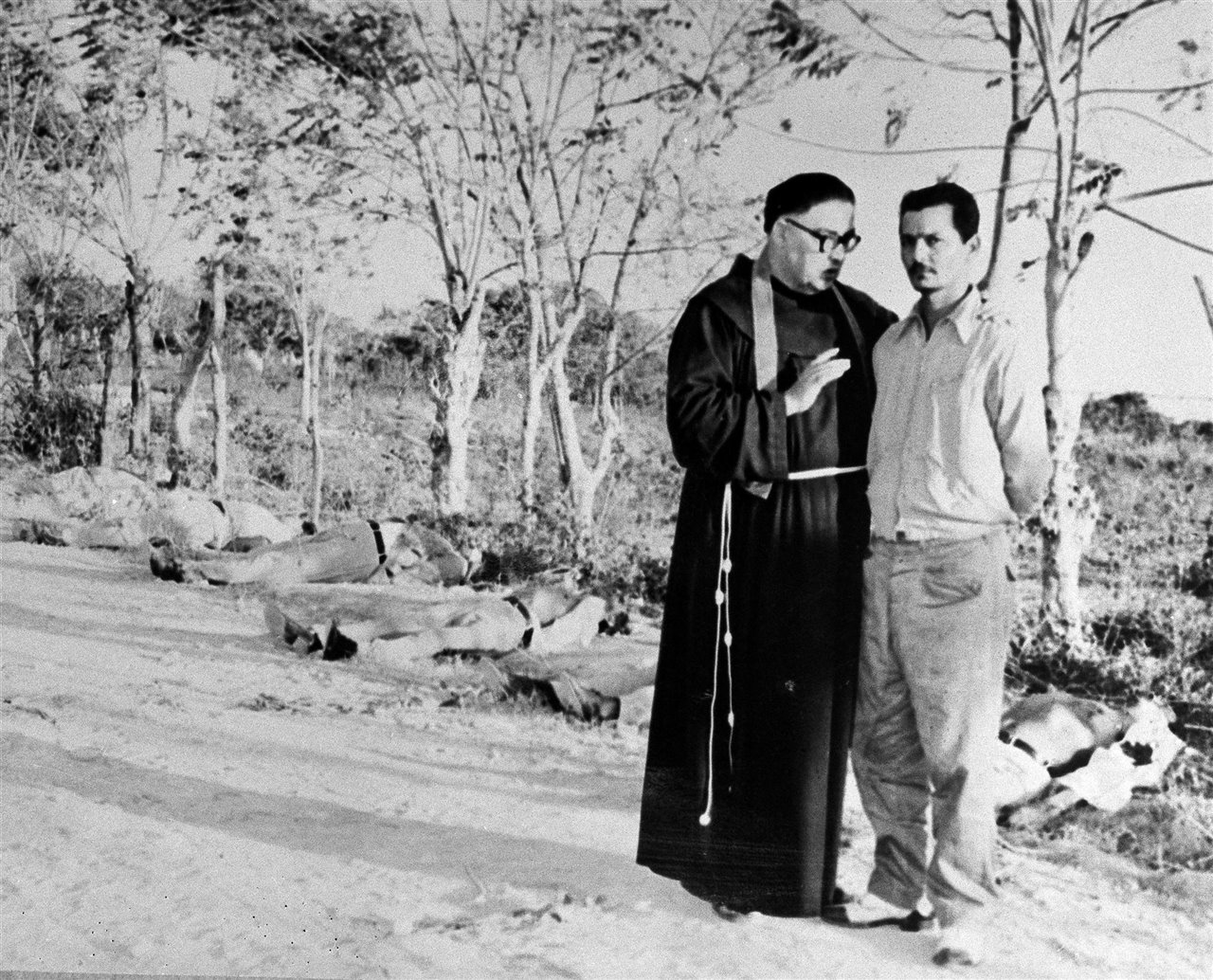
Moments before the execution of Arístidez Díaz in Manzanillo. Here he is received last rites.

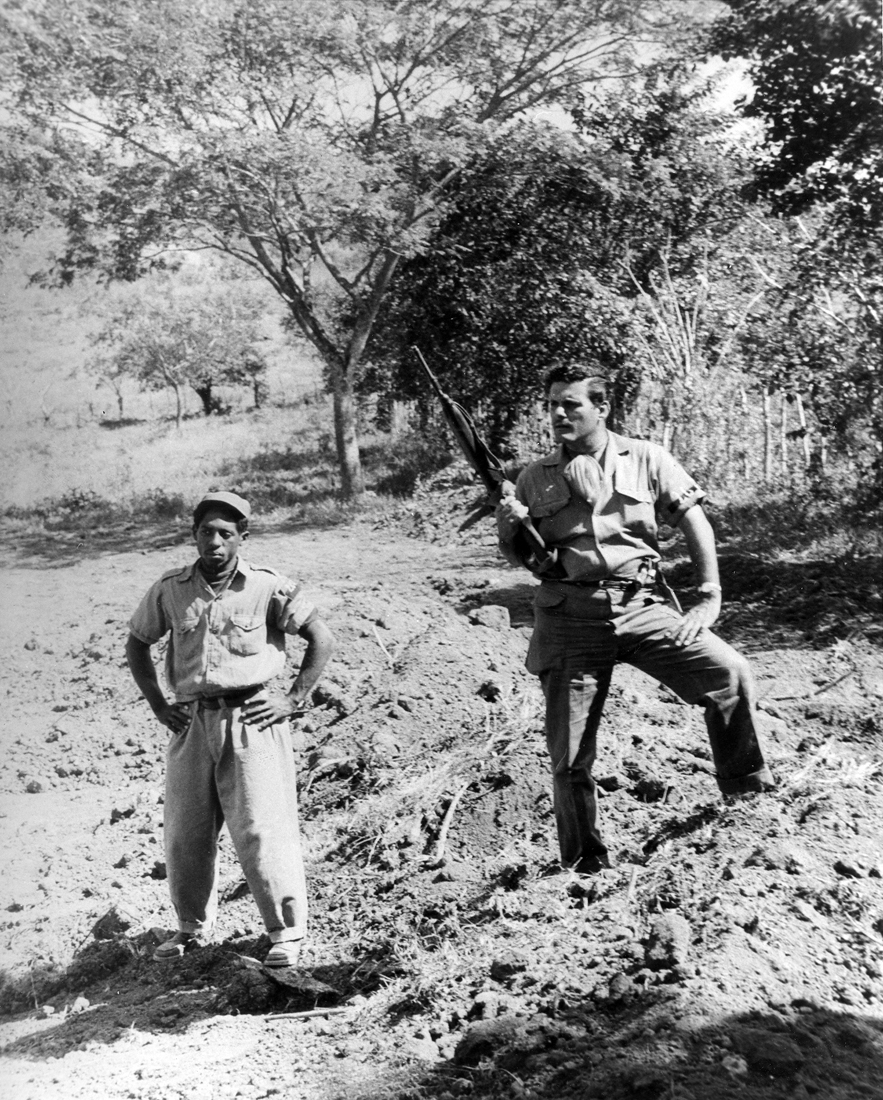
Frank Sturgis stands over the mass grave at San Juan Hill.

On January 12, 1959, around 2:00 AM, the executions began. The men were lined up, one by one, and shot in front of a 40-meter ditch. Between 71 and 73 Cubans were executed and buried in a mass grave that had been dug some time before the trial. Raúl Castro directed the massacre.

The list for the firing squad contained 72 names, but one managed to evade the squad, presumably thanks to personal contacts. He was a 15-year-old boy nicknamed El Fiñe. Three other prisoners of the total reconcentrated in galley No. 8 of the Boniato prison also managed to escape. Father Jorge Bez Chabebe accompanied each of the victims to their execution and confirmed that the shootings continued until ten in the morning. The journalist Antonio Llano Montes, a witness to the event, believed there were live victims among those shot who died of asphyxiation trying to dig their way out.

The Massacre was particularly announced and glorified by the official press at the time, in order to quell the population demanding executions. Some in the international community condemned the executions. Uruguay's delegate to the United Nations, the Cuban ambassador to Argentina, the liberal US senator Wayne Morse and the governor of Puerto Rico, Luis Muñoz Marín, protested. Fidel Castro's response was:

“We have given orders to shoot every last one of those murderers, and if we have to oppose world opinion to achieve justice, we are willing to do so".

In 1963, Hurricane Flora unearthed some of the bodies, removing them above ground and leaving them visible to everyone. The government relocated the bodies in heavy concrete tombs and thrown into the depths of the Cayman Trench.
