= San Juan Hill =

Hills east of Santiago, Cuba and scene of a battle

Coordinates: 20°01′N 75°48′W

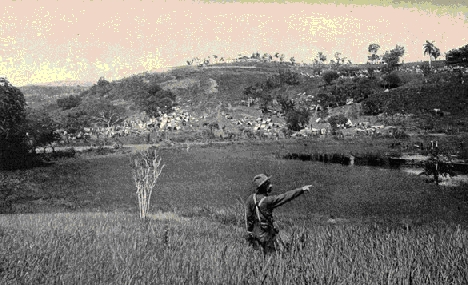
US Army photo taken near the base of Kettle Hill circa July 4, 1898. The soldier is pointing up to the top of Kettle Hill. In the background you can see the block houses on San Juan Hill and the American encampment.

San Juan Hill is a series of hills to the east of Santiago, Cuba, running north to south. It is located in the province of Santiago de Cuba, in the southeastern part of the country, 800 km east of Havana, the capital of the country. San Juan Hill is located 633 meters above sea level.

The area is known as the San Juan Heights or in Spanish Alturas de San Juan before the Spanish–American War of 1898, and are now part of Lomas de San Juan.

== Overview ==
This area was the site of the Battle of San Juan Hill during the Spanish–American War. The Americans named the lesser heights "Kettle Hill" and the higher southern hill "San Juan Hill" after the battle of July 2, 1898. The two high points or hills are connected by a draw or saddle on a north–south axis.

The fight for the San Juan Heights or Hills became known as the Battle of San Juan Hill due to a reporter's telegraphy error in which the plural "s" was dropped. American Army reports also referred to the heights as "hills".

San Juan Hill is the location of the Peace Tree, a giant ceiba, where General W.R. Shafter made surrender terms with the Spanish in 1898.

== See also ==
- San Juan Hill massacre
- El Caney
