= Samuel Farber =

American writer born and raised in Cuba

Samuel Farber (born 1939 in Marianao, Havana) is an American writer born and raised in Cuba.

Born and raised in Mariano, Cuba, Farber came to the United States in February 1958. He obtained a Ph.D. in sociology from the University of California, Berkeley in 1969 and taught at a number of colleges and universities including UCLA and, most recently, Brooklyn College of the City University of New York, where he is a professor emeritus of political science. His scholarship on Cuba is extensive and includes many articles and two previous books: Revolution and Reaction in Cuba, 1933-1960 (Wesleyan University Press, 1976) and The Origins of the Cuban Revolution Reconsidered (University of North Carolina Press, 2006). He is also the author of Before Stalinism: The Rise and Fall of Soviet Democracy (Polity/Verso, 1990) and Social Decay and Transformation: A View From The Left (Lexington Books, 2000). Farber was active in the Cuban high school student movement against Fulgencio Batista in the 1950s, and has been involved in socialist politics for more than fifty years.

He writes about Cuba and its revolution. He also contributes to several Latin American newspapers, such as Brecha.

== Bibliography ==
- Revolution and Reaction in Cuba, 1933–1960: A Political Sociology from Machado to Castro, 1976.
- Before Stalinism: Rise and Fall of Soviet Democracy, Verso Books, October 1990.
- The Resurrection of Che Guevara, New Politics, Volume 7, Number 1, (Summer 1998).
- Social Decay and Transformation: A View from the Left, Lexington Books, 2000.
- The Origins of the Cuban Revolution Reconsidered, The University of North Carolina Press, 2006.
- Cuba Since the Revolution of 1959, a Critical Assessment.
- The Politics of Che Guevara: Theory and Practice, Haymarket Books, 2016.
