= Lillian Guerra =

American historian

Lillian Guerra is an academic and professor of Cuban and Caribbean history and the director of the Cuba Program at the University of Florida.

== Early life ==
Guerra is the daughter of Cuban exile parents, who fled Cuba and immigrated to the United States in 1965. She was born in New York City, and as a young child was raised in Marion, Kansas. Her family subsequently moved to Miami, Florida when Guerra was fourteen years old. She has described herself in a New York Times article as "a Cuban born in New York and raised in Kansas and Miami."

== Education ==
Guerra attended Ransom Everglades School in Coconut Grove, Florida and subsequently received her B.A. from Dartmouth College (1992), and her Ph. D in History from the University of Wisconsin-Madison (Latin American Studies 2000). Guerra never graduated from High School, as she left it in her junior year to start attending Dartmouth.

== Work ==
Guerra is a widely published history researcher and author, whose work has a focus on Cuban history. Guerra has taught Cuban, Caribbean, and Latin American history at Bates College (2000-2004), Yale University (2004-2010) and currently since 2010 at the University of Florida. As a public lecturer, she has given many public lectures and keynote speeches, most notably at Harvard University, Stanford University, Duke University, University of Pennsylvania, Yale University Law School, Georgetown University, the J. Paul Getty Museum, the Universidad Diego Portales in Santiago de Chile, the Biblioteca Nacional de Chile, the Wilberforce Institute for the Study of Slavery and Emancipation in Hull, England, and many others.

== Awards ==
- Best Dissertation Prize, New England Council of Latin American Studies (NECLAS) (2000-2001)
- Bryce Wood Book Award (2014)
- William R. Jones Outstanding Mentor Award (2014)
- John Simmon Guggenheim Fellowship (2014-2015)
- American Council of Learned Societies Fellowship (2014-2015)
- National Endowment for the Humanities (NEH) Fellowship (2020)

== Books ==
- Popular Expression and National Identity in Puerto Rico (1998)
- The Myth of José Martí: Conflicting Nationalisms in Early Twentieth-Century Cuba (2005)
- Visions of Power in Cuba: Revolution, Redemption and Resistance, 1959–1971 (2012)
- Heroes, Martyrs and Political Messiahs in Revolutionary Cuba, 1946–1958 (2018)
- Patriots and Traitors in Cuba: Political Pedagogy, Rehabilitation and Vanguard Youth, 1961–1981

== Media ==
Guerra has served as advisor and lead scholar for films and documentaries such as American Comandante: Cuba’s Most Unlikely Revolutionary (PBS), Cuba: The Forgotten Revolution (American Public Television), and others. Cuba: The Forgotten Revolution was awarded an Emmy in 2016 for best documentary. She also often appears in television and magazine or newspaper stories requiring expert opinions on Cuban and Cuban-American issues.
