= Law of Cuba =

The substantive and procedural laws of Cuba were based on Spanish civil law. They were influenced by the principles of Marxism–Leninism, and after that, the philosophy became the government's guiding force. Cuba's most recent constitution was enacted in 2019.

== Principle of equality ==
Cuban law is dedicated to advancing equality among the Cuban population, according to state sources.

=== The Family Code ===
The Family Code covers marriage, divorce, marital property relationships, recognition of children, obligations for children's care and education, adoption, and tutelage. The following are Clauses 24, 25, 26, 27, and 28 of the Cuban Family Code:

24. Marriage is constituted on the basis of equal rights and duties of both partners.

25. The spouses must share the same home, be faithful to one another, help, consider and respect each other. The rights and duties established by this code will subsist in their entirety as long as the marriage has not been legally terminated, in spite of the fact that for justifiable reasons a common household cannot be maintained.

26. Both spouses are obligated to care for the family they have created and cooperate with each other in the education, formation and guidance of their children in line with the principles of socialist morality. As well, each to the extent of his or her capabilities and possibilities must participate in governing the home and cooperate toward its best possible care.

27. The spouses are obligated to contribute toward satisfying the needs of faculties and economic capacities. Nevertheless, if one of the spouses contributes only through his or her work in the home and child-care, the other spouse must provide full economic support without this meaning that he or she be relieved of the obligations of cooperating with the housework and child-care.

28. Both spouses have the right to exercise their professions or crafts and must lend each other reciprocal cooperation and aid to this effect, as well as in order to carry out studies or perfect their training, but in all cases they will take care to organize their home life so that such activities be coordinated with fulfillment of the obligations imposed by this code.

The Cuban people began to discuss the Family Code in early 1974; they wanted it to become law in time for the FMC Congress. The Family Code was so important to the Cuban people that they deemed it vital to have a complete, "far-reaching" discussion about it. People as young as junior high school students became enthusiastic about the code and held debates and discussions about it as the first law of tremendous importance to their future. Blas Roca announced the plan for the code discussion at the Women's Congress. Roca was a very active member of the Orthodox party, serving on the Secretariat and as head of the committee drafting new laws. He is now the president of the national People's Assembly. Like all of Cuba's most important laws, the Family Code had been published in a tabloid edition to reach every Cuban; virtually everyone who wanted to read and study it could. The Cuban people quickly mastered the new code in meetings through trade unions, CDRs, the FMC, and schools. Most Cubans attend more than one of these meetings until they digest all the information they need. Because the government wanted to ensure the code favors all, not some, people were encouraged at these meetings to ask questions and suggest additions, amendments, and/or deletions. "The way this process works is that a record is kept of each meeting, the results are sent through the respective organizations to their highest level, where they are tabulated, computed, and turned over to the original committee (adjacent, at the time, to the party's Central Committee, now adjacent to the National Assembly)." The Family Code was officially promulgated in Cuba on March 8, 1975, which marks International Women's Day.

== Substantive and procedural law ==
=== Criminal law ===
Cuba's criminal code was based on Spanish law until 1956.

Controversial portions of Cuba's criminal code include vague provisions providing for the arrest of persons committing anti-revolutionary acts.

The Cuban criminal code does not cover international law.

=== Private property ===
Cuban law has been criticized as offering little to no protection for private property.

In 1992, in response to the Special Period, the Cuban constitution was changed to authorize the limited existence of joint ventures and corporations.

Cuban law also permits the collective ownership of agricultural cooperatives.

In 2010, Cuban leaders Fidel and Raúl Castro abandoned the Soviet model of centralized planning. In 2011, new laws were enacted to expand the right to private property. In 2019, a new constitution was approved that recognizes the right to private property, while also asserting the central government's authority over the regulation of production and land.

=== Economic regulation ===
Cuba's laws provide for strong government regulation of the economy in almost all of its facets.

== History ==
=== Pre-1959 legal history ===
Cuba was a colony of Spain until it gained independence in 1899, following a military intervention by the United States (known in the U.S. as the Spanish–American War). It remained under a U.S. military government until 1902, when the U.S. oversaw the creation of a new government. The Diario de sesiones del Congreso de la República de Cuba (Daily sessions of the Congress of the Republic of Cuba) shows how Cuban law was shaped during this period.

The influence of both U.S. and Spanish rule on Cuban law persisted for decades. For example, the Spanish Penal Code influenced Cuba's 1936 Civil Defense Code, which remained in effect until 1979. The Spanish Civil Code of 1889 remained in effect (although modified) until 1987. U.S. influence appeared in the form of the Supreme Court of Appeals and judicial review.

=== Revolutionary period (1959–mid-1970s) ===
==== Major laws and changes ====
After the Cuban Revolution on January 1, 1959, much of the 1940 Constitution was reinstated. This did not fulfill the promises in the Manifesto of Montecristi, since Castro's government did not fully restore the constitution and failed to call elections within the 18 months required by the manifesto.

In the revolution's aftermath, the Congress was supplanted by a Council of Ministers, consolidating greater power in the revolutionary government. In the following years, the revolutionary government enacted hundreds of laws and decrees to effect basic change in Cuba's socioeconomic system, such as the First Agrarian Reform Law of May 1959; the Urban Reform Law of October 1960; the Nationalization Law of October 1960; the Nationalization of Education Law of June 1961; and the Second Agrarian Reform Law of October 1963. New institutions, such as the National Institute of Agrarian Reform (INRA), were established to implement these laws more efficiently.

==== Revolutionary courts ====
In February 1962, 45 Cuban Air Force officers were tried for genocide in the civilian courts and acquitted. Castro publicly denounced the acquittal as a miscarriage of justice. In response to the verdict, the Revolutionary Government established "Revolutionary Courts", whose purpose was to try those accused of collaboration with the deposed Batista regime, especially those accused of torture and assassination, and those engaged in counterrevolutionary activity. These courts were criticized for their summary procedures, which limited a defendant's ability to prepare for trial, and for lacking procedural safeguards, such as the right to appeal a guilty verdict. It has been noted that these courts produced fast, certain, and severe results. Hundreds of people were found guilty in these proceedings and executed. Hostility toward the Batista regime led to widespread acceptance of these courts among Cubans. Supporters of the Revolutionary Courts note that their institution may have prevented "mob justice", as was seen after other periods of revolution and social unrest.

==== People's popular courts ====
In the early 1960s, People's Popular Courts were set up, whose goal, according to Castro, was to correct antisocial behavior "not with sanctions in the traditional style, but rather with measures that would have a profound educational spirit". First established in the rural areas of the country, more than 2,200 such courts existed by the end of the 1960s. These courts' proceedings were made public to maximize their impact. The courts were criticized for overlapping with the jurisdiction of other courts and for inconsistent application of the law.

=== Institutionalization (mid-1970s–late 1980s) ===
==== Need for a new legal system ====
As the 1960s drew to a close, the most radical phase of the revolution had passed, and internal counter-revolution had been suppressed. The Cuban government sought to institutionalize the revolution. Key to this was the creation of a new legal system.

==== 1973 Reforms ====
In 1973, the Cuban Council of Ministers approved a structure for the new legal system, abolishing the People's Popular Courts and the Revolutionary Courts. In the place of the old legal system, a court system was established with four levels of jurisdiction: Base, District, Provincial, and National (Supreme Court). The Supreme Court was given appellate jurisdiction over four distinct areas of law: civil/administrative, criminal, state security, and military. The reforms of 1973 also ended private legal practice, and all lawyers who continued to provide legal services were required to join legal collectives, known as bufetes colectivos. Also included in the reforms was the creation of "lay judges", who served alongside professional judges and kept alive the popular spirit of the People's Courts. These reforms were criticized on the basis that many judges appointed to serve on these courts were incompetent and that the courts were not administered well.

==== Constitution of 1976 and socialist legality ====
In 1976, Cuba formally institutionalized the revolution by adopting a new constitution, which provided that the legal system be based on the principle of socialist legality. In constructing its legal system, Cuba looked to the countries of the Socialist Bloc for blueprints. The principle of socialist legality, as articulated by Cuban jurists, is that the role of the law is to create social stability while simultaneously advancing the development of the socialist society by changing Cuban political culture. As a guiding principle, socialist legality is explicitly transformative: its stated purpose is to transform society. This transformative principle penetrates to the heart of the law and has guided the development of Cuban Law since the mid-1970s. The explicit transformative principle of socialist legality sets it apart from the civil law and the common law legal systems, whose underlying principles are based on existing statute and custom, respectively.

==== Subsequent reforms ====
Successive reforms were instituted throughout the next 30 years to increase the autonomy of bufetes colectivos and the courts, adapt the courts to changing circumstances, and remedy other administrative problems.

=== Recent legal history (late 1980s–present) ===
==== Collapse of the Eastern Bloc ====
In the late 1980s and early 1990s, following the collapse of the Soviet Union, Cuba's laws changed again to respond to the new conditions of the Special Period. The constitutional amendments of 1992 recognized forms of non-socialist property (joint ventures, corporations, other economic associations) and provided for non-discrimination based on religious belief. For example, persons with religious beliefs may now join the Cuban Communist Party. However, Cuban priests have called this a token gesture, saying that, in fact, it is difficult for religious people to join the Party. Popular participation in government was expanded with the direct election of the National and Provincial assemblies. These changes signify Cuba's abandonment of the Soviet legal model.

==== 2002 Constitutional amendments ====
In 2002, the constitution was again amended to make the socialist system permanent and irrevocable. This came at a time when the Varela Project called for greater political freedom in Cuba.

==== Creation of private property rights ====
On April 18, 2011, the Sixth Cuban Congress approved laws expanding the internal market and access to global markets. In February 2019, voters approved a new Constitution granting a right to private property and greater access to free markets, while also maintaining Cuba's status as a socialist state.

==== 2019 Constitution ====
On February 24, 2019, voters approved a new constitution, which included reforms such as:

- The recognition of private property, and the creation of a freer market
- The restoration of the positions of President and Prime Minister of Cuba as posts separate from President of the Council of State and of Ministers
- The transfer of the head of the Council of State to the President of the National Assembly
- The position of mayor added to that of president of a municipal assembly
- The creation of a requirement for presidentially appointed provincial governors and deputy governors to be ratified by local municipal governments
- The acknowledgement of climate change and its threat
- The establishment of provincial councils made up of municipal leaders
- The creation of a two consecutive five-year term limit on the president
- Defining marriage as "a social and legal institution" and "one form of family organization"
- Extending the terms of municipal council delegates to five years
- Banning discrimination based on gender, race, ethnic origin, sexual orientation, gender identity or disability
- Restoring presumption of innocence in the justice system, last provided for in the 1940 constitution

The constitution was scheduled to be proclaimed on 10 April 2019. After being proclaimed, it was published in the Official Gazette of the Republic, ensuring its entry into force.

== See also ==
- Constitution of Cuba 2002, English language version
- Cuban Legal System
- Legal Profession (Cuba)
- Agrarian Reform Laws of Cuba
- Cuban civil code

== Footnotes ==
- Aviva Chomsky, Barry Carr, and Pamela Maria Smorkaloff, The Cuba Reader: History, Culture, Politics. Duke University Press, Durham and London. (2003)
