= Socialist Laws =

Socialist Laws may refer to one of the following:

- Socialist law
- Anti-Socialist Laws
