= Judicial system of Cuba =

The judicial system of Cuba consists of the judicial branch of the Cuban government, and the lawyers and judges who operate within it.

== History of the Cuban Judiciary ==
Shortly after the Cuban Revolution, the Cuban government adopted as its guiding force the ideas of Marxism-Leninism and sought to build a socialist society in accordance with these principles. In order to do this, the existing political and economic structure had to be dismantled, and with it, the nation's laws and legal system. Gradually, a new legal system arose, based heavily on communist legal theory.

Due to its Marxist-Leninist influences, the Cuban Judiciary is currently one of the organs under its unified power, the others being the executive, procurate and the permanent organ. It has been contended that the judiciary lacks independence and is subordinate to the National Assembly of People's Power, the highest organ of state power.

The original legal system in Cuba was a reflection of its status as a Spanish colony. Even after the nation received its independence in 1902, vestiges of Spanish law remained in effect – for example, the Civil Code remained in effect, with modifications, until 1987. The period of United States occupation and influence resulted in developments such as the Supreme Court of Cuba. After the Cuban Revolution, the legal system underwent a series of radical transformations, both in terms of its structure and also in terms of the laws it promulgated. After a variety of experimental tribunals and projects, the legal system was institutionalized in 1976, with the adoption of a new Constitution. In the intervening years, changes have continued to occur.

== Judges ==
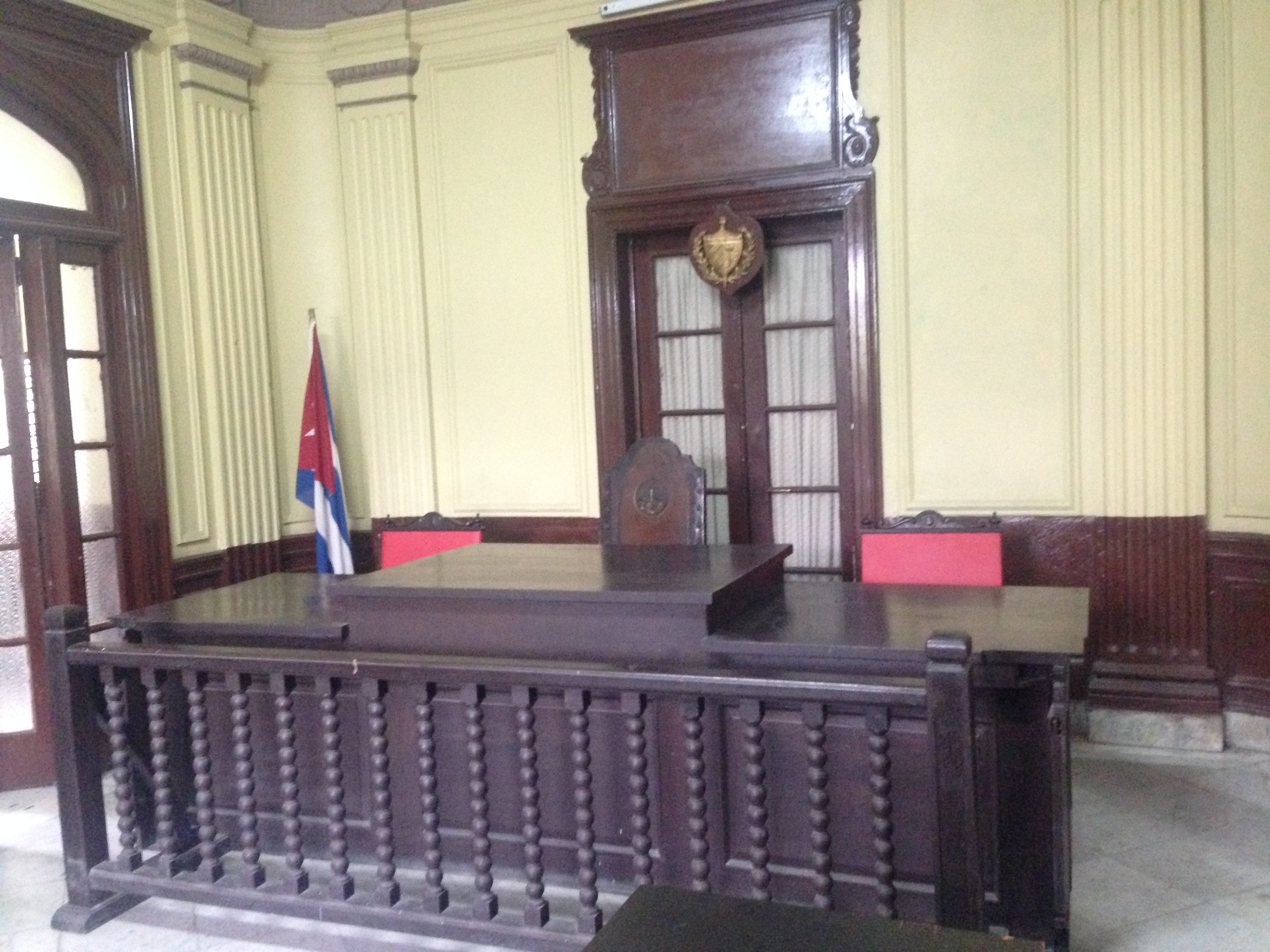
In this Havana courtroom, the professional judge sits in the chair at the center of the bench with the two lay judges at either side.

=== Professional Judges ===
Professional judges in Cuba are elected for unlimited terms, serving until they are no longer capable or until removed by the electoral body. Persons seeking to become judges are required to pass an examination given by the Ministry of Justice. The requirements to be a judge include age, citizenship, and a requisite amount of legal experience that varies depending upon which court one is to serve on (10 years for Supreme Court; Five years for Provincial Courts; Two years for municipal courts). Membership in the Cuban Communist Party is not required to be a judge. In 1988, 43% of the judges were not members of the Party.

=== Lay Judges ===
Lay judges serve alongside professional judges in all levels of the judicial system. Candidates for the position of lay judge are nominated in workplace assemblies and are screened by the Ministry of Justice to ensure they meet the age and citizenship requirements to be a judge. About 15,000 lay judges are selected for terms of five years, serving a maximum of 30 days per year, while continuing their regular employment. Observers note that lay judges in Cuba play a far more dynamic role than the lay judges in the former Soviet Union. On a whole, lay judges tend to represent the overall population in terms of race, gender, employment, and education.

=== Judicial Autonomy ===
Under Cuban law, judges are required to be independent in their judgment and free from the influence of organs of government in their deliberations. Judges can be removed for physical/mental incapacity, negligence or incompetence, or becoming the subject of criminal prosecution. Studies demonstrate judicial autonomy. A 1977 study noted that 43% of all criminal cases were dismissed due to lack of evidence. Buffets Collectives report that 32% of filed criminal cases were dismissed in 1991. A substantial portion of criminal (26%) and benefits (42%) decisions were overturned or modified in 2000 by municipal courts.

== Lawyers ==
=== History ===
In the years following the Cuban Revolution, many lawyers left Cuba. The legal profession saw its prestige decline as the new society looked toward it as another manifestation of the bourgeoisie that was to become unnecessary in the coming years of revolution. In the mid-1960s, Blas Roca Caldero began a process whereby the legal system in Cuba was resurrected to provide for the institutionalization of the Revolution. With the newfound relevance of the law to Cuba's revolutionary process, the practice of law began to become more widespread. Today, the legal profession serves both individuals and enterprises, as well as provides counsel to the government as Cuba struggles to find its place in the international economy.

=== Buffets Collectives ===
Buffeted Collectives' are collective law offices, first established by the Ministry of Justice after the private practice of law was abolished, and currently under the oversight of the National Organization of Buffeters Collectives (ONBC). In order to practice in a buffeter, one must graduate from law school in Cuba or a foreign country with Cuban validation. Exceptions to this can be made under extraordinary circumstances. Once in a buffeted, lawyers may practice anywhere in the country. Currently, approximately 2,000 lawyers practise in some 250 bufetes throughout Cuba, collectively handling some 200,000 cases per year. Lawyers in buffets typically have large caseloads and work under difficult conditions. A small number of bufetes specializing in providing legal assistance to foreign nationals have arisen in recent years.

=== Independent Law Offices ===
Independent legal practice is not permitted.

=== Legal Advisors to State Institutions and Enterprises ===
As of 1999, 30% of lawyers worked as legal advisors to state agencies, ministries, and commercial enterprises. These lawyers receive a lower salary than their counterparts in the bufetes, but this is offset somewhat by added perks and bonuses from their employer. Although historically relegated to ensuring contracts complied with government regulations, the shifts in the Cuban economy following the collapse of the Soviet Union have led to legal advisors taking a more active role in the market-based, commercial dealings of Cuba.

=== Professional life ===
The salary of lawyers is based upon the number and complexity of the cases which they handle. Better lawyers typically earn a higher salary.

=== Legal Ethics ===
Conflicts of interest (usually relationships with the opposing party) bar a lawyer from representing particular clients. The ONBC propagates rules of ethics and conduct and carries out punishment for their violation, usually in the form of warnings, although suspension, dismissal, and imprisonment are possible in cases of serious violations.

Lawyers are expected to uphold the principle of socialist legality in their practice, thereby strengthening socialism and socialist law. Critics argue that this requirement of the lawyers make it difficult for lawyers to defend their clients against the state. In 1984, laws were passed to remedy this problem, mandating that lawyers defend their clients with diligence and independence to the best of the lawyer's ability. Whether this law has its desired effect is debatable. Examples of passive defense counsel in criminal cases abound (such as the case of General Arnaldo Ochoa, sentenced to death for drug trafficking), while there also exist cases of defense counsel acting diligently on behalf of clients whose interests are diametrically opposed to those of the government.

=== National Union of Cuban Jurists ===
The National Union of Cuban Jurists (UNJC) is a professional organization for lawyers. Membership is voluntary and some 85% of practitioners are members. Headquartered in Havana, the UNJC comments on proposed legislation, publishes a law review (Revista Cubana de Derecho), and organizes various national and international legal conferences and symposia.

=== Legal Education ===
In the early days of the revolution, Fidel Castro, himself a lawyer, advised the young people of Cuba not to study law, instead opting for the study of the sciences, engineering, and medicine. The Revolution's emphasis on developing other academic skills, coupled with the decrease in relevance of lawyers in the revolutionary process in which Cuba was engaged in the early 1960s, led to a dramatic decrease in enrollment at the University of Havana College of Law. Some years passed with no new enrollments (1964–65), while others saw no students graduating (1978 and 1979). The curriculum changed as the new political structures made courses on commercial and contract law far less important.

Beginning in the late 1970s, the Ministry of Higher Education began to tinker with the law school curriculum in order to make more comprehensive the legal education received by law students. In the early 1990s, a new plan was instituted that emphasized basic theory and history in a number of different areas of the law, coupled with practical experience. Today, there are law schools in Havana, Camagüey, Santiago de Cuba, and Villa Clara. Enrollment totals approximately 1,100 at the University of Havana, and 3,500 nationwide. Entrance into law school is competitive. Tuition and room and board are free for Cuban residents, while the cost of books is subsidized by the state. Between 1982 and 1992, graduating law students were required to work in a bufete for three years as a social service and to gain experience in a wide range of practice areas. This was altered in 1992, and now graduates can perform their social service in a wide variety of legal jobs.

== See also ==
- Cuban Law
