= Arnaldo Ochoa =

Cuban general (1930–1989)

Arnaldo Ochoa Hero of the Republic of Cuba
- Born: 1930; Cacocum, Cuba
- Died: July 13, 1989 (aged 58–59); Baracoa, Cuba
- Cause of death: Execution by firing squad
- Burial place: Havana's Cemetery
- Military career
- Allegiance: Cuba
- Branch: Cuban Revolutionary Armed Forces
- Rank: General
- Conflicts: Cuban Revolution; Invasion of the Dominican Republic; Bay of Pigs Invasion; Angolan Civil War; Ogaden War
- Awards: Hero of the Republic of Cuba (1984-1989)

Arnaldo Tomás Ochoa Sánchez (1930 – July 13, 1989) was a Cuban army general who was executed alongside Antonio de la Guardia by the government of Fidel Castro after being found guilty of a variety of crimes including drug smuggling and treason under suspicious circumstances.

== Career ==
Ever since its creation, he was part of Fidel Castro's 26th of July Movement, and by March 1957 he had joined Castro's guerrilla army in the Sierra Maestra, fighting against dictator Fulgencio Batista. Ochoa played a major role in the fall of Santa Clara, becoming a close friend of Raúl Castro. Ochoa is said to have been the only survivor of the Camilo Cienfuegos loyalists sent on a doomed expedition against the Trujillo dictatorship in the Dominican Republic in 1959.

He also fought against Brigade 2506 in the Bay of Pigs Invasion. E. Bovo, the Curator of the Bay of Pigs Museum, claims that he was not a commander, rather that he served under 'El Gallego' José Ramón Fernández, a former officer under the Batista government.

In 1965 he became a member of the Communist Party of Cuba. Ochoa was a member of the Party's Central Committee for more than twenty years. He attended the War College in Matanzas, Cuba, and was later sent to the Frunze Academy in the Soviet Union. In 1966 Ochoa with the Venezuelan guerrilla commander Luben Petkoff, took a boat to the shores of Falcón, Venezuela, one of his most secretive expedition. Along with 15 other Cuban military was sent by Castro to strengthen Douglas Bravo guerrillas fighting the government of Raúl Leoni that ended in a major strategic loss at large rebel cost.

Between 1967 and 1969, he trained rebels in the Congo. In 1975, Ochoa was sent to fight in a critical campaign against the National Liberation Front of Angola (FNLA) in Luanda, Angola, where he won the respect of both Soviet and Cuban commanders. In 1977 he was named commander of Cuban Expeditionary Forces in Ethiopia under the command of Soviet General Petrov. His successes during the Ogaden War impressed the Soviet commanders in the field.

By 1980, Ochoa was widely considered a great internationalist, and was awarded the title "Hero of the Republic of Cuba" by Fidel Castro in 1984, which after his trial and execution in 1989, was stripped from him.

== Arrest and execution ==
Five years later, Ochoa was chosen by Defense Minister Raúl Castro to become the head of Cuba's Western Army. Since this branch of the military protects Cuba's capital city, Havana, and its top leaders and installations, the position would have made him the third most powerful military figure on the island, after Commander in Chief Fidel Castro and General Raúl Castro. What was expected to be a routine background check prior to the announcement of his appointment began to unravel, however, when at appointment, the government accused Ochoa of corruption, which included, but was not limited to, the sale of diamonds and ivory from Angola and the misappropriation of weapons in Nicaragua. As the investigation continued, links were found to other military and Ministry of the Interior officials who were engaged in even more serious crimes: taking pay-offs from South American drug-traffickers, including Pablo Escobar and General Manuel Noriega in exchange for letting them use Cuban territorial waters for drug drops and pick-ups. General Raúl Castro, who was very close to Ochoa personally, later said he pleaded with Ochoa on a number of occasions to come clean, reveal everything, so they could move forward. When Ochoa refused to cooperate, on June 12, the Ministry of the Revolutionary Armed Forces announced his arrest and investigation for serious acts of corruption, dishonest use of economic resources, and abetting drug trafficking.

At dawn on July 13, 1989, Ochoa was executed by a firing squad alongside Antonio de la Guardia and two senior officers of the Ministry of the Armed Forces and Ministry of the Interior (MININT), after a military court convicted them of drug smuggling and treason. Many questioned this explanation, and speculated that it was politically motivated given his prominence as a respected war hero and formerly close relationship with Fidel and Raúl Castro. Later allegations from a former Castro bodyguard claimed that Ochoa was executed, and Interior Minister Jose Abrantes sentenced to a 20-year prison term, allegedly to cover up the Castro brothers' high-up involvement in the drug smuggling trade.
