= Agrarian reforms in Cuba =

1959 and 1963 laws to redistribute land

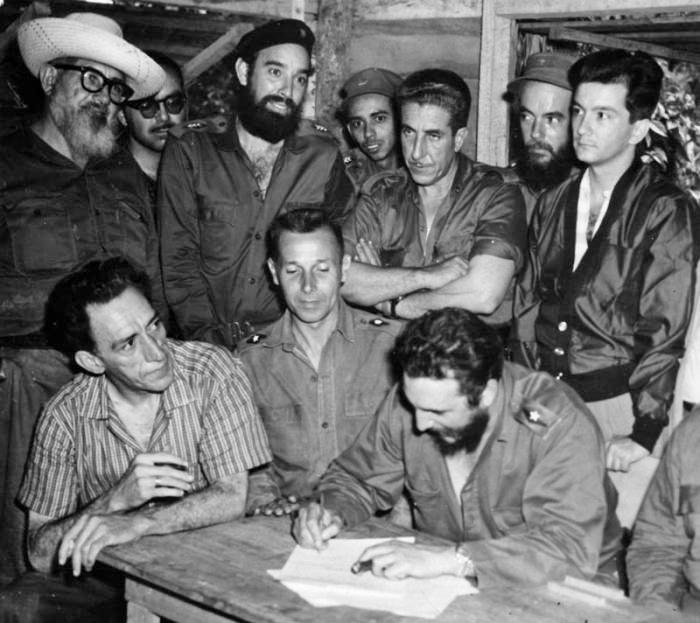
Fidel Castro signs first agrarian law in 1959.

The agrarian reforms in Cuba sought to break up large landholdings and redistribute land to those peasants who worked it, to cooperatives, and the state. Laws relating to land reform were implemented in a series of laws passed between 1959 and 1963 after the Cuban Revolution. The Institutio Nacional de Reforma Agraria (INRA)—an agency of the Cuban government responsible to implement the first and second Agrarian Reforms. The agency adapted the Soviet model of organisation—small collectives (Asociación Nacional de Agricultures Pequeños) and large(er) state farms.

== Background ==
=== Cuban Revolution ===
Fidel Castro inaugurated an insurrection in Cuba with an attack on the Moncada Barracks. After being captured and tried, Castro delivered a speech titled "History Will Absolve Me". In the speech, Castro comments on the "revolutionary laws" he would have implemented after the success of his attack. In regards to how these laws related to land reform, Castro stated:

The second revolutionary law would give non-mortgageable and non-transferable ownership of the land to all tenant and subtenant farmers, lessees, share croppers and squatters who hold parcels of five caballerías of land or less, and the State would indemnify the former owners on the basis of the rental which they would have received for these parcels over a period of ten years.
The third revolutionary law would have granted workers and employees the right to share 30% of the profits of all the large industrial, mercantile and mining enterprises, including the sugar mills. The strictly agricultural enterprises would be exempt in consideration of other agrarian laws which would be put into effect.

After being freed from prison, Castro formed the 26th of July Movement and began engaging in combat in Cuba in 1956. A year later in 1957, the organization issued its Sierra Maestra Manifesto. The manifesto includes demands for land reform, stating that one of the organization's goals was:

Establishment of the basis for an agrarian reform to distribute barren lands and convert into owners all the tenant farmers, sharecroppers, squatters, and lessee planters who have small parcels of land, be it property of the state or of private persons, with prior indemnification to the owners of the land.

=== Provisional Government ===
After the success of the Cuban Revolution, rebel commander Che Guevara made one of his most significant speeches on January 27, 1959, discussing the "social aims of the rebel army". In the speech Guevara comments on land reform, stating:

We have begun to put the Rebel Army's social aims into effect; we have an armed democracy. When we plan out the agrarian reform and observe the new revolutionary laws to complement it and make it viable and immediate, we are aiming at social justice. This means the redistribution of land and also the creation of a vast internal market and crop diversification, two cardinal objectives of the revolutionary government that are inseparable and that cannot be postponed since they involve the people's interest.

On 15 April 1959, Castro began an 11-day visit to the United States, at the invitation of the American Society of Newspaper Editors. Fidel Castro made the visit in hopes of securing U.S. aid for Cuba. While there he openly spoke of plans to nationalize Cuban lands and at the United Nations he declared Cuba was neutral in the Cold War. He said during his visit: "I know the world thinks of us, we are Communists, and of course I have said very clear that we are not Communists; very clear."

== History ==
=== First agrarian reform ===
The first reform law was implemented in May 17, 1959, which eliminated latifundios—large scale private ownerships, and granted ownership and titles to workers who previously worked on those lands, and paying rent for land was abolished. The law the regulated the size of farms to 3,333 acres (13 km^{2}) and real estate to 1,000 acres (4 km^{2}). Any holdings over these limits were expropriated by the government and either redistributed to peasants in 67 acres (271,139 m^{2}) parcels or held as state-run communes.

Four days after the announcement of the law, the owners of the 34 major American sugar mills went to the U.S. embassy to voice their frustrations. On June 3, 1959, the law went into effect. On June 11, the U.S. government issues an official statement of protest, claiming that compensation was too low. Compensation was based on taxation rates which had been stagnant for 30 to 40 years, thus making the estimated compensation commensurate to the low amount of taxes paid by owners for the past three to four decades.

On the anniversary of the 26th of July, the Cuban government invited peasants who had received new land titles to visit Havana. Half a million visiting peasants were housed in either private homes or in the gala hall of the Presidential Palace.

Agrarian reform caused almost 40% of arable land to be removed from foreign owners and corporations to the state, which then distributed these lands primarily to farmers and agricultural workers. This arrangement gave small peasant farmers limited autonomy, but it all changed in August 1962 when Castro announced that the small cooperatives would be converted to state farmers. Moreover, in instances where the government seized land from small peasants for public use, the small peasants were entitled to compensation. In Cuba, compensation, though written into the reforms, was not guaranteed when land titles were liquidated by the state. The law also stipulated that sugar plantations could not be owned by foreigners. For lands taken over compensation was offered in the form of Cuban currency bonds to mature in 20 years at 4.5% interest. Bonds were based on land values as assessed for tax purposes. Lastly, two years into the implementation of the first agrarian land reforms, approximately 58.4 per cent of arable land was privately owned, while 41.6 per cent was under government control, which required a second wave of reforms. Both of these reforms were carried out for the purpose of increasing production, diversifying crop production, and eliminating rural poverty.

=== Second agrarian reform ===
The second agrarian reform solidified the centralisation of state farms and nationalisations of land and other natural resources. The second agrarian reform law was introduced in 1963 to further limit the allowable size of private farms—all property holdings over 67 hectares became nationalised. Thus, these reforms allowed for the state farmlands to dominate the agricultural sector—70 per cent of the arable land was under the state control and the government became the largest employer, while 30 per cent was privately owned. As a result, between 80 and 85 per cent of Cuba's land was expropriated. The centralisation of Cuba's economy through farming had advantages—productions of meat, milk, rice, and sugarcane increased exponentially. However, these advancements fell short in meeting the demands of the populace when it comes to root vegetables and fruits. These supply-demand shortages were a direct result of the economic organisation—private farmers used to be the ones to produce these goods. However, as the state centralised agricultural production, the participation of private farmers decreased.

As a result of the state's dominant position in agriculture, the first and second agrarian reforms transformed Cuba's natural resource organisation. First, the reforms abolished the latifundios — Cuba was able to return to pre-colonial way of organising — small farmers, cooperatives style, social and financial services such as the Credit and Services Cooperatives (CSS) developed to support the new way of organising. However, the elimination of one kind of hegemony created another. Although implementing the Soviet model of supply distribution (implementing farming tools and inputs) had positive results in terms of increased the production of large-scale crops such as sugar cane and improved infrastructure, it also led to Cuba's dependence on the Soviet Union. Not only did the biodiversity and environment suffer, but Cuba also grew to be dependent on the Soviet Union for its production and supply inputs, making it vulnerable to external shocks. When the Soviet Bloc collapsed in the 1990s, Cuba had to explore alternative solutions to sustain its production. To fill the gap of production inputs, the state encouraged cooperatives: small farmers using traditional peasant knowledge of production and returning to animal traction, at a lower cost and less damage to the environment. The state implemented the Basic Units of Cooperative Production (UBPCs), which limited the sizes of state farms.

== See also ==
- Agriculture of Cuba
- Economy of Cuba
- Law of Cuba
- Constitution of Cuba
