= Socialist law =

Type of legal system

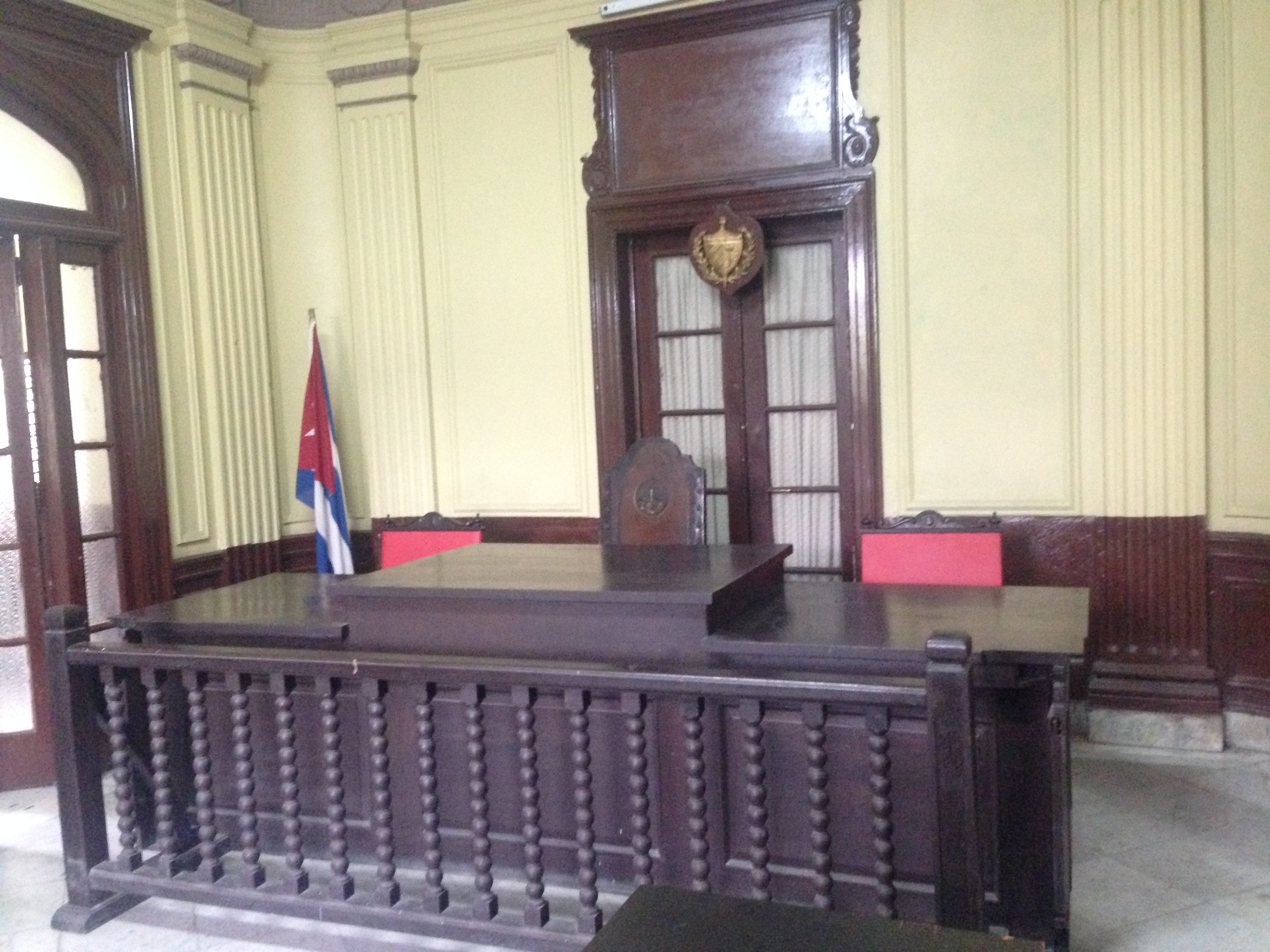
In this courtroom in Havana, Cuba, the professional judge sits in the chair at the center of the bench with the two lay judges at either side. Cuba is one of several states with a socialist law system.

Socialist law or Soviet law are terms used in comparative legal studies for the general type of legal system which has been (and continues to be) used in communist and formerly communist states where the supreme state organ of power (SSOP) stands above the communist state constitution, and the supreme judicial organ and the supreme procuratorial organ work under the SSOP's leadership. It is based on the civil law system, with major modifications and additions from Marxist–Leninist ideology. There is controversy as to whether socialist law ever constituted a separate legal system or not. If so, prior to the end of the Cold War, socialist law would be ranked among the major legal systems of the world.

While civil law systems have traditionally put great pains in defining the notion of private property, how it may be acquired, transferred, or lost, socialist law systems provide for most property to be owned by the state or by agricultural co-operatives, and having special courts and laws for state enterprises.

Many scholars argue that socialist law was not a separate legal classification. Although the command economy approach of the communist states meant that most types of property could not be owned, the Soviet Union always had a civil code, courts that interpreted this civil code, and a civil law approach to legal reasoning (thus, both legal process and legal reasoning were largely analogous to the French or German civil code system). Legal systems in all socialist states preserved the formal criteria of the Romano-Germanic civil law; for this reason, law theorists in post-socialist states usually consider the socialist law as a particular case of the Romano-Germanic civil law. Cases of development of common law into socialist law are unknown because of incompatibility of basic principles of these two systems (common law presumes the influential rule-making role of courts while courts in socialist states play a dependent role).

An article published in 2016 suggests that socialist law, at least from the perspective of public law and constitutional design, is a useful category. In the NYU Journal of International Law and Policy, William Partlett and Eric Ip argue that socialist law helps to understand the "Russo-Leninist transplants" that currently operate in China's socialist law system. This helps to understand the "distinctive public law institutions and approaches in China that have been ignored by many scholars".

== Soviet legal theory ==
Soviet law displayed many special characteristics that derived from the socialist nature of the Soviet state and reflected Marxist–Leninist ideology. Vladimir Lenin accepted the Marxist conception of the law and the state as instruments of coercion in the hands of the bourgeoisie and postulated the creation of popular, informal tribunals to administer revolutionary justice. One of the main theoreticians of Soviet socialist legality and proletarian law in this early phase was Pēteris Stučka. Other proponents of proletarian law included Dmitry Kursky and Nikolai Krylenko.

Alongside this trend was one more critical of the concept of "proletarian justice", represented by Evgeny Pashukanis. A dictatorial trend developed that advocated the use of law and legal institutions to suppress all opposition to the regime. This trend reached its zenith under Joseph Stalin with the ascendancy of Andrey Vyshinsky, when the administration of justice was carried out mainly by the security police in special tribunals.

During the de-Stalinization of the Nikita Khrushchev era, a new trend developed, based on socialist legality, that stressed the need to protect the procedural and statutory rights of citizens, while still calling for obedience to the state. New legal codes, introduced in 1960, were part of the effort to establish legal norms in administering laws. Although socialist legality remained in force after 1960, the dictatorial and utopian trends continued to influence the legal process. Persecution of political and religious dissenters continued, but at the same time there was a tendency to decriminalize lesser offenses by handing them over to people's courts and administrative agencies and dealing with them by education rather than by incarceration. By late 1986, the Mikhail Gorbachev era was stressing anew the importance of individual rights in relation to the state and criticizing those who violated procedural law in implementing Soviet justice. This signaled a resurgence of socialist legality as the dominant trend. Socialist legality itself still lacked features associated with Western jurisprudence.

== Characteristic traits ==
Socialist law is similar to the civil law but with a greatly increased public law sector and decreased private law sector.

- extensive social warrants of the state (the rights to a job, free education, free healthcare, retirement at 60 for men and 55 for women, maternity leave, free disability benefits and sick leave compensation, subsidies to multichildren families, ...) in return for a high degree of social mobilization.
- the judicial process lacks an adversarial character; public prosecution is considered as "provider of justice."
- partial or total expulsion of the former ruling classes from the public life at early stages of existence of each socialist state; however, in all socialist states this policy gradually changed into the policy of "one socialist nation without classes"
- diversity of political views directly discouraged.
- the ruling Communist party was eventually subject to prosecution through party committees in first place.
- abolition of private property, thus near total collectivization and nationalization of the means of production;
- subordination of the judiciary to the Communist Party
- low respect for intellectual property as knowledge and culture was considered a right for human kind, and not a privilege as in the free market economies.

A specific institution characteristic to Socialist law was the so-called burlaw court (or, verbally, "court of comrades", Russian товарищеский суд) which decided on minor offences.

In the traditional Marxist view, law is a policy tool available to government rather than being viewed as an end in itself.

== Socialist rule of law ==
During the Reform and Opening Up period, the Chinese Communist Party (CCP) emphasized the rule of law as a basic strategy and method for state management of society. However, proposals to create a system of law separate from the CCP were abandoned after the 1989 Tiananmen Square protests and massacre. CCP general secretary Jiang Zemin first called for establishing a socialist rule of law at the Fifteenth Party Congress in 1997. In 2014, the CCP formally adopted a policy of constructing a "socialist rule of law with Chinese characteristics."

In his writings on socialist rule of law, General Secretary of the Chinese Communist Party Xi Jinping has emphasized traditional Chinese concepts including people as the root of the state (mingben), "the ideal of no lawsuit" (tianxia wusong), "respecting rite and stressing law" (longli zhongfa), "virtue first, penalty second" (dezhu xingfu), and "promoting virtue and being prudent in punishment" (mingde shenfa). Xi states that the two fundamental aspects of the socialist rule of law are: (1) that the political and legal organs (including courts, the police, and the procuratorate) must believe in the law and uphold the law, and (2) all political and legal officials must follow the CCP.

== See also ==
=== General ===
- Legal systems of the world

=== China ===
- Law of the People's Republic of China
- Legal history of China
- Chinese law

=== Cuba ===
- Cuban legal system
- Cuban law

=== Soviet Union ===
- Law of the Soviet Union
- Ministry of Justice of the USSR
- Procurator General of the USSR
- Review of Central and East European Law, formerly known as the Review of Socialist Law
