= El Gallego =

Spanish Slang

El Gallego in Spanish means 'The Galician',

Cultura Gallega Cuba

but Cubans apply it to anyone likened to Spanish working class immigrants, hence it is often combined with given names of Cubans and quoted in literature.

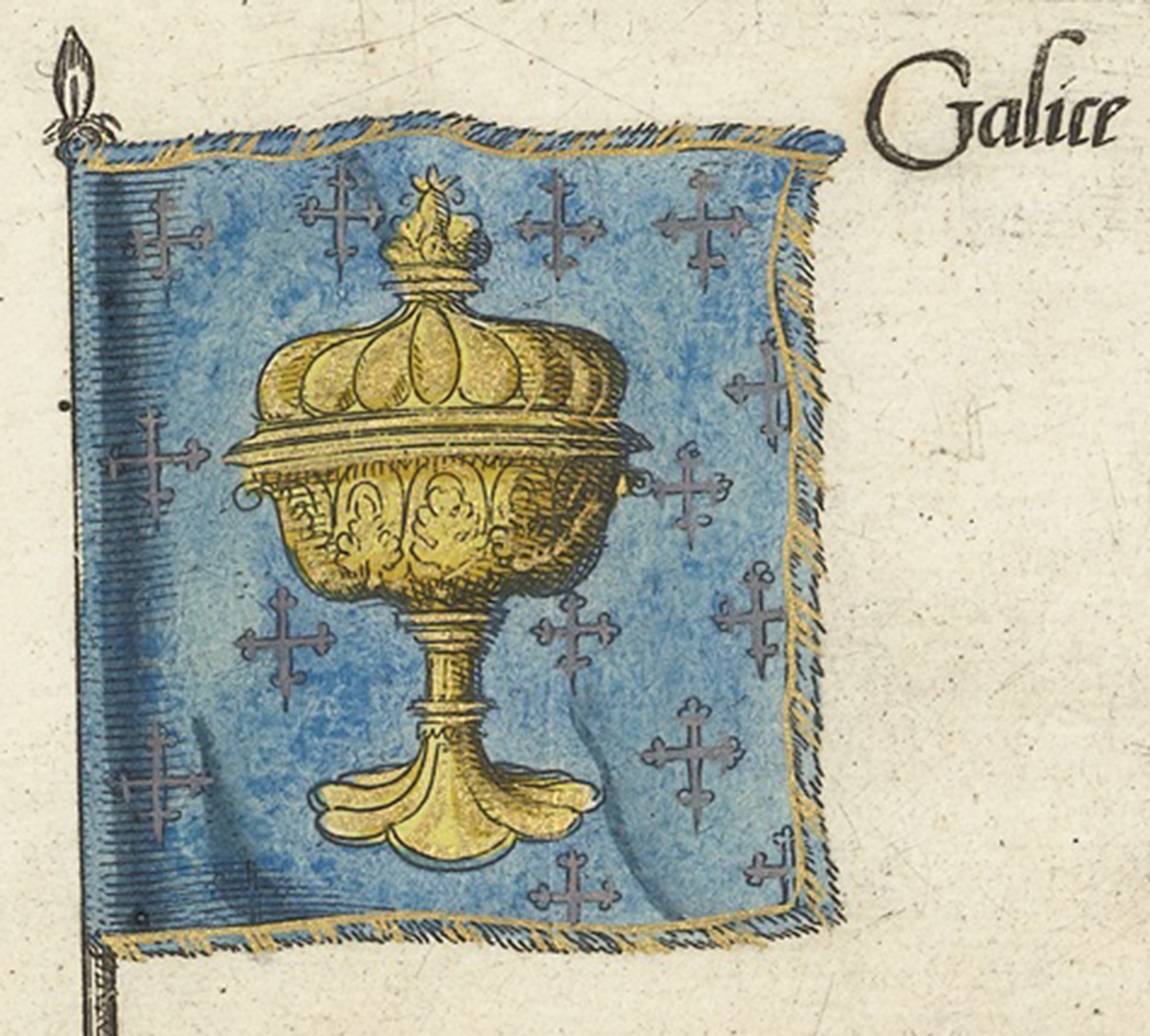
