= Instituto Nacional de Reforma Agraria =

Cuban agency formed to institute the Agrarian Reform Law of 1959

The National Institute for Agrarian Reform (Spanish: Instituto Nacional de Reforma Agraria, INRA) was an agency of the Cuban Government that was formed to institute the Agrarian Reform Laws of 1959 and 1963. INRA oversaw the development of rural infrastructure. Its first head was Antonio Núñez Jiménez.

== See also ==
- Agriculture in Cuba
