= Tony de la Guardia =

Colonel in the Cuban Ministry of Interior (1939–1989)

Tony de la Guardia (born Antonio de la Guardia y Font in 1939 in Havana, Cuba – 1989 in Havana, Cuba) was a Colonel in the Cuban Ministry of Interior. He worked in Fidel Castro's administration, and in 1989 was executed, convicted of cocaine trafficking.

He was the son of Mario de Guardia y Curbelo and Graziella Font. He had an older brother, Mario and a twin brother, Patricio de la Guardia y Font who was sentenced to 30 years of prison in 1989, eventually being released in July 2019.
