= Huber Matos affair =

Political scandal in Cuba

- Part of the Consolidation of the Cuban Revolution
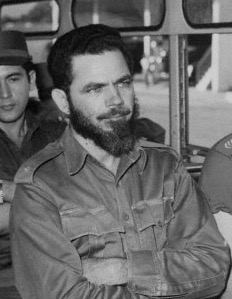
- Matos in a prison transport bus shortly after his arrest.
- Date: October 19–21, 1959
- Location: Camagüey Province, Cuba
- Caused by: Appointment of PSP members to public office; Aggressive agrarian appropriations; Appointment of Raúl Castro to head of Army
- Goals: Public acknowledgement of "communist threat"
- Methods: Mutiny/Resignation
- Result: Arrest of Matos and 14 mutineer officers

Parties
Matos' officers	Cuban Revolutionary Armed Forces

Lead figures
Huber Matos	Fidel Castro; Camilo Cienfuegos

Casualties
- Arrested: 15

The Huber Matos affair (Spanish: Asunto de Huber Matos) was a political scandal in Cuba when on October 20, 1959, army commander Huber Matos resigned and accused Fidel Castro of "burying the revolution". Fifteen of Matos' officers resigned with him. Immediately after the resignation, Castro critiqued Matos and accused him of disloyalty, then sent Camilo Cienfuegos to arrest Matos and his accompanying officers. Matos and the officers were taken to Havana and imprisoned in La Cabaña. Cuban communists later claimed Matos was helping plan a counter-revolution organized by the American Central Intelligence Agency and other Castro opponents, an operation that became the Bay of Pigs Invasion.

The scandal is noted for its occurrence alongside a greater trend of removals of Castro's former collaborators in the revolution. It marked a turning point where Castro was beginning to exert more personal control over the new government in Cuba. Matos' arresting officer and former collaborator of Castro, Camilo Cienfuegos, would soon die in a mysterious plane crash shortly after the incident.

== Prelude ==
=== Reforms ===
In early January 1959, Fidel Castro appointed various economists such as Felipe Pazos, Rufo López-Fresquet, Ernesto Bentacourt, Faustino Pérez, and Manuel Ray Rivero. By June 1959, these appointed economists would begin to express disillusionment with Castro's proposed economic policies.

In early 1959, the Cuban government began agrarian reforms which redistributed the ownership of Cuba's land. Expropriated lands would be put into state ownership and the newly formed Instituto de la Reforma Agraria (INRA) was to oversee the expropriations and be headed by Fidel Castro. In Camagüey Province there was growing opposition to the Cuban government due to the resistance of conservative farmers to the agrarian reforms and distaste for Raúl Castro and Che Guevara's promotion of communist ideals in the local government and military. The anti-communist opposition within the Cuban government assumed that Fidel Castro was unaware of growing communist influence because of Fidel Castro's frequent public disavowals of communism.

Cuban revolutionary Antonio Núñez Jiménez had been appointed the first director of the INRA, and was suspected of communist sympathies by the US embassy. Fellow revolutionary Manuel Artime had been appointed under Jiménez to carry out appropriations in Manzanillo. Working for the INRA began to concern Artime who grew weary of the anti-Catholic and anti-American rhetoric he began to see in the Cuban government.

=== Matos' disillusionment ===
Matos who was the army commander of the Camagüey Province was outraged at the use of army troops to seize cattle from farmers who resisted INRA orders. Matos believed that these measures were growing overzealous.

In July 1959, Matos grew suspicious of the new government after the deposition of President Manuel Urrutia Lleó, and attempted to soon resign. On 26 July, Castro and Matos met at the Hilton Hotel in Havana, where, according to Matos, Castro told him: "Your resignation is not acceptable at this point. We still have too much work to do. I admit that Raúl [Castro] and Che [Guevara] are flirting with Marxism ... but you have the situation under control ... Forget about resigning ... But if in a while you believe the situation is not changing, you have the right to resign."

Matos had been traveling to Havana for months before his eventual resignation. In Havana Matos conducted meetings with various officials from Manuel Ray Rivero to Manuel Fernandez, and discuss their concerns about the growing communist influence, and the need to alert Fidel Castro. While it is known that Huber Matos was conversing with the future leaders of the Bay of Pigs Invasion Matos himself claimed to never have abided by foreign influences, which the Cuban government accused him of following.

In September 1959 Matos become solidified in his decision to soon resign. In October 1959 Fidel Castro ordered a minor member of the 26th of July Movement to go on television and accuse Matos of treason. This would be Matos's turning point in refusing to further tolerate his position in the Cuban government.

== Resignation and arrest ==
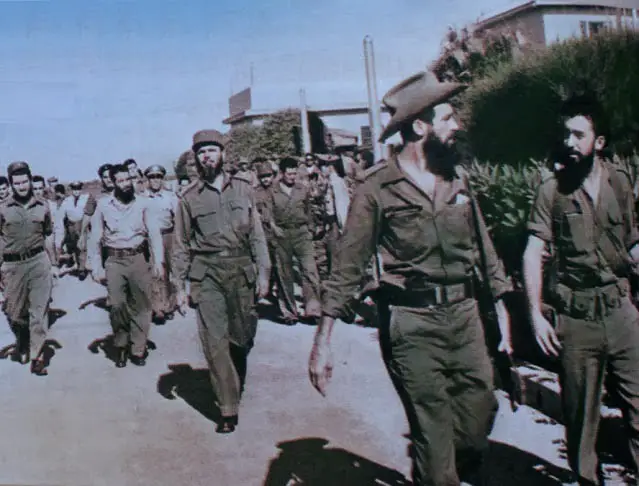
Arrest of Huber Matos (back), with Camilo Cienfuegos (in front) leading.

On October 19, 1959, Matos wrote in a resignation letter: "Communist influence in the government has continued to grow. I have to leave power as soon as possible. I have to alert the Cuban people as to what is happening." On 19 October, he sent a second letter of resignation to Castro. Matos lamented in his resignation that communists were gaining positions of power that he felt were undeserved for having not participated in the Cuban Revolution. The resignation letter was apparently in direct response to Raúl Castro's appointment to head of the army, and was privately sent to Fidel Castro. Hubert Matos had arranged that the letter's sending be covered by local media and informed local opposition groups. Matos planned for his officers to also resign en masse in support.

Two days later, Castro sent fellow revolutionary Camilo Cienfuegos to arrest Matos. When Cienfuegos greeted Matos at the gates of his command post Matos ordered his guards not to shoot and proceeded to talk with Cienfuegos over coffee. Matos says that he warned Cienfuegos that his life was in danger, that Castro resented Cienfuegos' popularity and had purposely infuriated and seemed to have hoped that Matos' supporters would kill him rather than allow him to take command from Matos. Cienfuegos listened but relieved Matos of command and arrested Matos and his military adjutants. (Note: Cienfuegos then mysteriously disappeared en route back to Havana and his disappearance remains unexplained, though some historians speculate it was probably an accident.) In the meantime Fidel Castro flew down to the INRA headquarters in the Camagüey Province to organize a mob of 3000 men to storm Mato's army post if Cienfuegos was unable to arrest him. Raúl Castro's security chief Ramiro Valdés Menendéz took Matos from Cienfuegos and transported him to Havana to wait to stand trial.

The same day Matos was arrested, Cuban exile Pedro Luis Díaz Lanz, a former air force chief of staff under Castro and friend of Huber Matos during their time in the revolution, flew from Florida and dropped leaflets into Havana that called for the removal of all Communists from the government. In response, Castro held a rally where he called for the reintroduction of revolutionary tribunals to try Matos and Diaz for treason. According to the New York Times, when Castro asked the crowd if Matos should be shot, "[a]lmost every hand was raised and the crowd again screamed: 'Firing squad! Firing squad!'". In the view of U.S. Ambassador to Cuba Philip Bonsal, Castro used Díaz Lanz's action, which he characterized as a "bombing", to create a mass reaction and suppress the issues raised by Matos's resignation. (Note: Cuban government forces had fired on Díaz Lanz's plane over Havana, and the debris that fell on the city killed three and wounded more than forty.) Following the rally, Castro called a government meeting to determine Matos's fate. Guevara and Raúl Castro favored execution, and three ministers who questioned Castro's version of events were immediately replaced by government loyalists. Castro decided against execution, explaining that "I don't want to turn him into a martyr."

== Aftermath ==
=== Economist resignations and overhaul ===
Shortly after Hubert Matos' detention various other disillusioned economists would send in their resignations. Felipe Pazos would resign as head of the National Bank and be replaced within a month by Che Guevara. Cabinet members Manuel Ray and Faustino Perez also resigned.

Along with becoming the new head of the National Bank, Guevara also acquired the position of Minister of Finance. In 1960, Guevara began promoting an idea of rapidly industrializing Cuba, and diversifying Cuba's agriculture.

In 1961, Guevara proposed a four year plan for rapid industrialization and agricultural diversification. On February 23, 1961, the Council of Ministers created the new Ministry of Industries for Che Guevara to head, and execute his new industrialization plan. This appointment, combined with other positions, placed Guevara at the zenith of his power at total command of the Cuban economy.

=== Resignation and defection of Artime ===
Shortly after Matos' arrest, the prime minister and Che Guevara made a speech to members of the INRA that Cuba would continue to turn in a socialist direction. Manuel Artime viewed the arrest of Matos and affirmation of socialism in Cuba as precedent for him to resign. On 7 November 1959 his resignation letter from INRA and the revolutionary army was published on the front page of Avance newspaper, one of the last newspapers not controlled by the government. Artime then entered an underground organization run by Jesuits in Cuba to hide fugitives, it is unclear what exactly made Artime immediately turn to hiding and later defect. While in a Havana safehouse Artime would form the Movement for Revolutionary Recovery with other dissidents. Artime then contacted the American embassy in Havana, and on 14 December 1959, the CIA arranged for him to travel to the US on a Honduran freighter ship. He became closely involved with Gerry Droller (alias Frank Bender, alias "Mr B") of the CIA in recruiting and organizing Cuban exiles in Miami for future actions against the Cuban government. Artime's organization MRR thus grew to become the principal counter-revolutionary movement inside Cuba, with supporting members in Miami, Mexico, Venezuela etc. Involved were Tony Varona, José Miró Cardona, Rafael Quintero, Aureliano Arango. Infiltration into Cuba, arms drops, etc. were arranged by the CIA.

=== Disappearance of Cienfuegos ===
After the arrest of Huber Matos, Bohemia magazine records that Cienfuegos commented on the political trajectory of the provisional government by stating:

This Revolution is humanist, olive green, and as Cuban as the palm trees; but be assured that if the solution to the people's problems, if the guarantee of the future were communism, then I will be a communist.

On the late evening of 28 October 1959, Cienfuegos' Cessna 310 ('FAR-53') disappeared over the Straits of Florida during a night flight, returning from Camagüey to Havana. An immediate search lasted several days, but the plane was not found. By mid-November, the search was called off and Cienfuegos was presumed lost at sea. He quickly became a hero and martyr for the Cuban Revolution. Cienfuegos' disappearance remains unexplained. There is some debate in regard to Cienfuegos' death, although Cuban historians do not believe that there was any foul play by the government. There is speculation that Fidel was responsible, which Matos believes is the case. Despite the fact of Cienfuegos' evidently exceptional loyalty to Castro, he hesitantly supported the arrest of his friend Matos only days earlier. Che Guevara, who was close to Cienfuegos and named his son Camilo in his honor, dismissed the notion of Castro's involvement. Others offer the possibility that a Cuban air force fighter plane mistook Cienfuegos' plane for a hostile intruder and shot it down. In the words of U.S. Ambassador Philip Bonsal, Cienfuegos enjoyed Havana's nightlife and he "may have had a penchant for friendships and associations deemed undesirable by some of his more austere revolutionary comrades". There has also been speculation that Cienfuegos faked his death and fled to the US, as some speculate it may have been to Ybor City in Tampa.

=== Trial ===
Five captains and eleven lieutenants who had protested his arrest were tried with him. On the first day of the trial, 11 December, Matos testified that he had discussed the appointment of communists to the government with officers who shared his anti-communist sentiments, but had engaged in no conspiracy against the government. On 13 December, Raúl Castro testified that Matos was trying to foster disunity by raising "the phantom of communism". Testifying the next day, Castro delivered a seven-hour speech accusing Matos and the others of campaigning against the revolution and "indirectly" promoting the interests of the United States, large landowners, and supporters of Batista and the dictatorship in the Dominican Republic. The prosecution asked for the death sentence. On 15 December, the court found Matos guilty of counter-revolutionary activity and sentenced him to twenty years in prison. He served the first six and a half years of his sentence at the Isla de la Juventud prison, where Castro had been imprisoned in 1953, and the remainder in Havana's La Cabaña Prison. According to Matos:

Prison was a long agony from which I emerged alive because of God's will. I had to go on hunger strikes, mount other types of protests. Terrible. On and off, I spent a total of sixteen years in solitary confinement, constantly being told that I was never going to get out alive, that I had been sentenced to die in prison. They were very cruel, to the fullest extent of the word. ... I was tortured on several occasions, [I] was subjected to all kinds of horrors, all kinds, including the puncturing of my genitals. Once during a hunger strike a prison guard tried to crush my stomach with his boot ... Terrible things.

Matos served his full term and was released from prison on 21 October 1979.

=== Political consolidation ===
The controversy surrounding Huber Matos' arrest was only a signal for the trend of larger political consolidation around Fidel Castro. By October Raúl Castro was appointed head of the army. Shortly after the government would reorganize trade unions and ordered the dismissal of any university faculty that criticized the government. By mid-1960 very few independent organizations existed inside of Cuba outside of the Catholic Church. Oppositional voices within government institutions were regularly fired or excluded from decision making.

Print unions also began demanding that newspapers put tag-lines ("coletillas") after articles they disagreed with. Soon after this implementation, printers unions would outright seize newspapers, and allow them to be nationalized.
