= Betrayal thesis =

Interpretation of the Cuban Revolution

Flag of the 26th of July Movement, created by Castro to oust Batista in the Cuban Revolution.

Flag of Brigade 2506, created to oust Castro for "betraying" the Cuban Revolution.

The betrayal thesis is an interpretation of the Cuban Revolution that supposes that the revolution was the culmination of a democratic resistance to the dictatorship of Fulgencio Batista. After the success of the revolution in 1959, the rebel leader Fidel Castro began to consolidate political power, and associate with communist officials. This political turn is considered a "betrayal" of the original ethos of the revolution, according to proponents of the betrayal thesis.

The betrayal thesis was developed in the early 1960s, in the immediate aftermath of the Cuban Revolution. It was propagated by Cuban exile organizations such as the Cuban Democratic Revolutionary Front, and the Cuban Revolutionary Council. The thesis was also famously propagated by anti-Stalinist historian Theodore Draper.

== Historical background ==
=== Ideology of the Cuban Revolution ===
In 1953, Fidel and Raúl Castro gathered 70 fighters and planned a multi-pronged attack on several Cuban military installations. On 26 July 1953, the rebels attacked the Moncada Barracks in Santiago and the barracks in Bayamo, only to be decisively defeated by the far more numerous government soldiers. During Castro's court trial for the attack, Castro presented a speech that contained numerous evocations of the "father of Cuban independence" José Martí, whilst depicting Batista as a tyrant. According to Castro, Batista was a "monstrum horrendum ... without entrails" who had committed an act of treachery in 1933 when he initiated a coup to oust Cuban president Ramón Grau. Castro went on to speak of "700,000 Cubans without work", launching an attack on Cuba's extant healthcare and schooling, and asserting that 30% of Cuba's farm people could not even write their own names.

In Castro's published manifesto, based on his 1953 speech, he gave details of the "five revolutionary laws" he wished to see implemented on the island:

1. The reinstatement of the 1940 Cuban constitution.
2. A reformation of land rights.
3. The right of industrial workers to a 30% share of company profits.
4. The right of sugar workers to receive 55% of company profits.
5. The confiscation of holdings of those found guilty of fraud under previous administrative powers.

After being exiled, Castro formed the 26th of July Movement, and returned to Cuba to overthrow Batista by guerilla war. The beliefs of Fidel Castro during the revolution have been the subject of much historical debate. Fidel Castro was openly ambiguous about his beliefs at the time. Some orthodox historians argue Castro was a communist from the beginning with a long-term plan; however, others have argued he had no strong ideological loyalties. Leslie Dewart has stated that there is no evidence to suggest Castro was ever a communist agent. Levine and Papasotiriou believe Castro believed in little outside of a distaste for American imperialism. As evidence for his lack of communist leanings they note his friendly relations with the United States shortly after the revolution and him not joining the Cuban Communist Party during the beginning of his land reforms.

At the time of the revolution the 26th of July Movement involved people of various political persuasions, but most were in agreement and desired the reinstatement of the 1940 Constitution of Cuba and supported the ideals of Jose Marti. Che Guevara commented to Jorge Masetti in an interview during the revolution that "Fidel isn't a communist" also stating "politically you can define Fidel and his movement as 'revolutionary nationalist'. Of course he is anti-American, in the sense that Americans are anti-revolutionaries".

=== Provisional Government ===
The Cuban Revolution succeeded in overthrowing Batista on January 1, 1959. A provisional government was established soon after. Fidel Castro held de facto veto power during the process of establishing a provisional government. This de facto power came from his position as commander-in-chief of the rebel army. Immediately after the rebel army seized power, Castro and other rebels agreed to place Manuel Urrutia Lleó as President of Cuba.

In a speech delivered in April 1959, Fidel Castro announced the postponement of the elections promised, which were scheduled to occur after the overthrow of Fulgencio Batista. Castro announced this electoral delay with the slogan: "revolution first, elections later". The announcement was the beginning of an electoral delay that culminated in the solidification of Fidel Castro's rule over Cuba.

In July 1959, Castro accused President Urrutia of corruption and resigned. In the aftermath of Castro's resignation, angry mobs surrounded the Presidential Palace, and Urrutia resigned. Castro was reinstated into his position, and a growing political sentiment in Cuba associated Fidel Castro with the only source of legitimate power Fidel Castro soon replaced Manuel Urrutia with Osvaldo Dorticós Torrado as President of Cuba. Dorticós was a member of the Popular Socialist Party.

At a May Day celebration in 1960, Fidel Castro finally cancelled all elections, announcing that elections are corrupt, and that Cuban citizens legitimize his rule by defending his government.

== Theoretical development ==
=== Aftermath of the Cuban Revolution ===
In the immediate aftermath of the Cuban Revolution, José Miró Cardona was appointed as new prime minister, only to resign and flee to Miami. While in Miami, Cardona wrote in the magazine Diaro de la Marina that the Cuban Revolution was a much needed progressive force, that should not ignore the poor of Cuba. Cardona eventually became associated with the Cuban Revolutionary Council and the Cuban Democratic Revolutionary Front. These organizations both aimed to "save" the revolution from its undemocratic turn.

After Fidel Castro's visit to the United States in 1959, various American academics began publishing essays and books on the character of the Cuban Revolution and Fidel Castro. Some arguing that Castro was veering away from the goals of the Cuban Revolution, and towards Stalinism. Others argued that the criticisms of Castro were unwarranted. Throughout 1960, many articles were published in the socialist Monthly Review journal, arguing against any rumored "betrayal" of the Cuban Revolution. These articles were influenced by the writings of socialists Paul Sweezy and Leo Huberman, who visited Cuba in 1959.

=== Bay of Pigs Invasion ===
In 1961, the historian Theodore Draper famously published in the anti-Stalinist Encounter magazine, that Castro had betrayed the Cuban Revolution, and that Castro could bring international war. The article was passed to John F. Kennedy, who considered it before approving the Bay of Pigs Invasion. According to Draper, the Cuban Revolution was a middle class movement for democracy. Fidel Castro, after coming to power, began pursuing a wave of land reforms in 1960 and 1961. During this time, Castro drifted away from his original democratic goals. Eventually, Castro heavily integrated Communist officials into his provisional government, and by Draper's conception, Castro had abandoned the democratic goals of the Cuban Revolution, and his own land reform plans of 1960–1961.

Draper considered his betrayal thesis to be a criticism of the accounts of socialists like Paul Sweezy and Leo Huberman who were sympathetic to Castro. Draper attempted to present a Marxist interpretation of Castroism, that made analogies to Trotskyist conceptions of Stalinism as a betrayer of the Russian Revolution.

The journalist Herbert Matthews generally agreed with Draper's thesis, but offered some criticism. While Matthews acknowledges that the goals of the Cuban Revolution were originally only democratic, and that the provisional government birthed its own unexpected zeal for land reform, Matthews claims that Castro did not abandon this later enthusiasm for land reform, and that Castro's embrace of communists was done out of a defense for land reform.

On April 3, 1961 the Kennedy administration releases its "White Paper on Cuba"; a document authored by historian Arthur M. Schlesinger Jr. The contents detail communist influence in Cuba, and accuse Castro of betraying the promises of the Cuban Revolution. Later that month, with Kennedy's approval, the Bay of Pigs Invasion would commence.

After the Bay of Pigs Invasion, Manuel Ray Rivero, an invasion veteran himself, founded the People's Revolutionary Movement. The militant group valued the progressive nature of the Cuban Revolution but argued it had been "betrayed" by Castro's undemocratic turn. The organization was apprehended in 1964, trying to plan an invasion of Cuba.

== Criticism ==
The historian Ramón Eduardo Ruiz wrote his 1968 book Cuba: The Making of a Revolution, as a direct refutation of the betrayal thesis, and argued the Cuban Revolution was always destined to be at odds with the United States, thus Castro's anti-American and communist turn was not some sort of conspiracy, but a natural continuation of the Cuban Revolution.

Political scientist Katherine Gordy argues in her 2015 book Living Ideology in Cuba that the political turn that took place in Cuba after 1959, was neither a "betrayal" nor a "loyal continuation" of the Cuban Revolution, because ideological developments have no fixed teleology. Instead, she argues the 1959 political turn is the result of a variety of social and historical factors, that are greater than one promise, or a conspiracy to betray a promise.

== See also ==
- Grassroots dictatorship
- Gusano
- Kennedy's betrayal
