= Revolution first, elections later =

Slogan coined by Fidel Castro

The slogan "revolution first, elections later" was coined by Fidel Castro in a speech given on April 9, 1959. The speech famously announced the postponement of the elections promised by Fidel Castro, which were scheduled to occur after the overthrow of Fulgencio Batista. The announcement was the beginning of an electoral delay that culminated in the solidification of Fidel Castro's rule over Cuba. On May Day, 1960, Fidel Castro would outright condemn elections as corrupt, and cancel all future elections.

== Background ==
On March 10, 1952, three months before the Cuban elections, presidential candidate Fulgencio Batista, with army backing, staged a coup and seized power. He ousted outgoing President Carlos Prío Socarrás, canceled the elections and took control of the government as a provisional president.

On July 26, 1953, just over a year after Batista's second coup, a small group of revolutionaries attacked the Moncada Barracks in Santiago. Government forces easily defeated the assault and jailed its leaders, while many others fled the country. The primary leader of the attack, Fidel Castro, was a young attorney who had run for parliament in the canceled 1952 elections. Although Castro was never officially nominated, he felt that Batista's coup had sidetracked what would have been a promising political career for him. In the wake of the Moncada assault, Batista suspended constitutional guarantees and increasingly relied on police tactics in an attempt to "frighten the population through open displays of brutality."

Castro was imprisoned for his role in the Moncada Barracks attack, and in a famed speech, colloquially titled "History Will Absolve Me", which he made during his court trial, Castro gave out a list of demands which included the reinstatement of the 1940 Constitution of Cuba.

After Castro founded the 26th of July Movement, and it began engaging in combat in 1956, the organization issued the Sierra Maestra Manifesto in 1957. The manifesto demanded multi-party elections to be held in Cuba.

== History ==
=== Establishing provisional government ===
After the Triumph of the Revolution, Castro held de facto veto power during the process of establishing a provisional government. This de facto power came from his position as commander-in-chief of the rebel army. Immediately after the rebel army seized power, Castro and other rebels agreed to place Manuel Urrutia Lleó as President of Cuba.

On January 8, 1959, Fidel Castro announced that elections would occur within 18 months. In a speech a few days later, it was announced elections would take place in 15 months. A month later he said elections would be unfair because he'd win in a landslide. Over the coming months, crowds would boo and hiss when Castro would allude to coming elections.

In February 1959, Castro asked President Urrutia to make him prime minister, which Urrutia granted. As prime minister, Castro banned all political parties except the Popular Socialist Party. Castro also had the ability to order retrials of people who juries found not guilty.

Political positions in the first two years after the Cuban Revolution were extremely fluid, and poorly defined in legal terms. It was often loyalty that was the determining factor in being appointed to a government position.

=== Electoral delay ===
On April 9, 1959, Fidel Castro announced that elections would be delayed for fifteen months. While traveling to New York, Fidel Castro announced that elections may enable the return of an oligarchy to control Cuban society. Despite his skepticism, he assured that elections would be held within four years.

In a television interview on June 10, 1959, Fidel Castro was asked about plans for elections. He responded:

The Revolution needs time to accomplish its purpose, and the less it is interrupted, the sooner this will be possible. If one can work without interruptions, the time needed will be considerably less. It seems to me that once the Agrarian Reform is completed, which is the basic point of the Revolution, elections can be held at any time.

In July 1959, Castro accused President Urrutia of corruption and resigned. In the aftermath of Castro's resignation, angry mobs surrounded the Presidential Palace, and Urrutia resigned. Castro was reinstated into his position, and a growing political sentiment in Cuba associated Fidel Castro with the only source of legitimate power Fidel Castro soon replaced Manuel Urrutia with Osvaldo Dorticós Torrado as President of Cuba. Dorticós was a member of the Popular Socialist Party.

The ousting of Urrutia would start a wave of resignations by moderates and anti-communists in the provisional government. In October, military officer Huber Matos resigned from his post, citing fears of a communist takeover. Matos was arrested for his protest.

=== Electoral cancelation and censorship ===
At a May Day celebration in 1960, Fidel Castro finally cancelled all elections, announcing in a speech:

Our enemies, our detractors, are calling for elections. Even a Latin American government leader stated recently that only those governments which are the product of an electoral process should be accepted into the OAS, as if a true revolution, like that in Cuba, could come to power without the people, as if a true revolution, like that in Cuba, could come to power against the will of the people, as if the only democratic way of gaining power were through the electoral process, which has so often been prostituted in order to falsify the will and the interests of the people, and to bring to power those who were often the most inapt and the most cunning, not the most competent and the most honest.

Is it possible that after so many fraudulent elections, and the repeated policy of betrayal and corruption, that the people could believe that the only democratic procedure is elections? It is not only with a pencil marking a ballot, but also with blood that a people can take part in a patriotic life.

The general ethos of this announcement was that elections were useless, because citizens legitimized his rule by defending his government.

Around this same time, "coletillas" ("tag lines" in English) were being added to newspapers. These taglines often condemned the contents of certain articles. This condemnation was done through the effort of the communist controlled printers union. After the seizure of newspapers by the government in late 1960, coletillas were no longer applied.

== Aftermath ==
=== Opposition ===
In the immediate aftermath of the Cuban Revolution, José Miró Cardona was appointed as new prime minister, only to resign and later flee to Miami. While in Miami, Cardona wrote in the magazine Diaro de la Marina that the Cuban Revolution was a much needed progressive force, that should not ignore the poor of Cuba. Cardona eventually became associated with the Cuban Revolutionary Council and the Cuban Democratic Revolutionary Front. These organizations both aimed to "save" the revolution from its undemocratic turn.

In the summer of 1960, major fidelistas were breaking with Castro, and forming dissident groups. Former government ministers Manuel Ray, and Rufo Lopez-Fresquet, as well as labor leader David Salvador, formed the Movimiento Revolucionario del Pueblo, advocating for a "Fidelismo without Fidel", meaning that Castro's social reforms should continue, but not Castro's personal consolidation of power.

In June of 1960, the Cuban Democratic Revolutionary Front announced its existence in Mexico City. It hoped to serve as an umbrella organization for various Cuban opposition groups. The included groups were the Constitutional Democratic Rescue Organization, the Movement for Revolutionary Recovery, the Montecristi Organization, the Christian Democrat Movement, the Triple A Organization, and the Anti-Communist Associations Bloc. The super-group criticized Castro's removal of civil liberties, and demanded the restoration of the constitution of 1940. Most of the participating opposition groups had already been active in the earlier opposition to Batista.

The Cuban Revolutionary Council (Spanish: Consejo Revolucionario Cubano, CRC) was a formed, with CIA assistance, to "coordinate and direct" the invasion of the Cuban Democratic Revolutionary Front into Cuba, known as the Bay of Pigs Invasion. José Miró Cardona, former Prime Minister of Cuba, was chairman of the Cuban Revolutionary Council. Miró became the de facto leader-in-waiting of the intended post-invasion Cuban government. The CRC comprised the former Cuban Democratic Revolutionary Front, with the addition of the Movimiento Revolucionario del Pueblo.

=== Political institutionalization ===
In July 1961, Castro officially merged the 26th of July Movement, the Popular Socialist Party, and a smaller third party, to form one group called the Integrated Revolutionary Organizations. In December 1961, Castro declared that he was personally a Marxist–Leninist. In October 1965, the Integrated Revolutionary Organizations was officially renamed the "Cuban Communist Party" and published the membership of its Central Committee.

Cuba had no constitutional government for 16 years, from 1959 to 1976. After this non-constitutional period, the revolutionary government of Cuba sought to institutionalize the revolution by putting a new constitution to a popular vote. The Constitution of 1976, modeled after the 1936 Soviet Constitution, was adopted by referendum on 15 February 1976, in which it was approved by 99.02% of voters, in a 98% turnout.

The constitution established the National Assembly of People's Power as the democratic forum of law-making. While members of the body are elected, only one political party is legal (the Communist Party of Cuba), and candidates can only campaign on biographies, without presenting political opinions.

The first elections after the 1959 revolution took place on 2 November 1976.

== See also ==
- Bolshevization of the soviets
- Soft coup
