= Humberto Sorí Marin =

Cuban revolutionary (1915–1961)

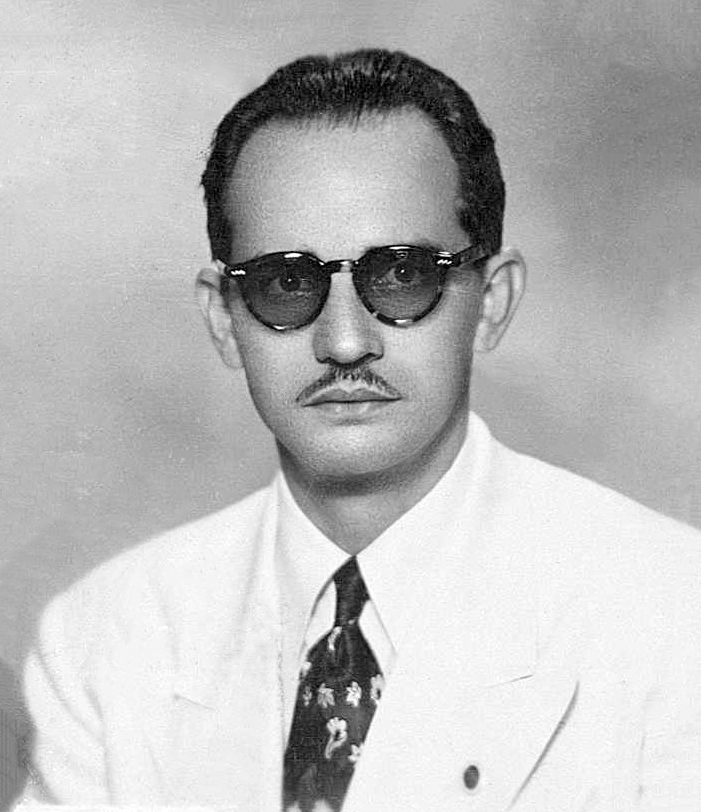
Humberto Sorí Marin in 1954

Humberto Sorí Marín (3 December 1915 in Cuba – 20 April 1961 in Havana, Cuba) was a Cuban revolutionary. After the Cuban Revolution in January 1959, he served as minister of agriculture, but resigned in May 1959. Shortly before the Bay of Pigs Invasion, he was arrested after landing in Cuba with arms and explosives, and was executed after the invasion.

== 1950s politics ==
In the early 1950s, Sorí Marín was a professional lawyer and a member of Partido Auténtico (the Authentic Party), a Cuban political party with a nationalistic ideology.

== Revolution ==
In 1957, he joined the 26th of July Movement in the Sierra Maestra mountains. In 1958, he helped Fidel Castro to draft laws that would be followed by the rebel army, and intended to be introduced later into government. The first law authorized summary courts-martial, and penalties included execution for crimes of murder, arson and looting; the law was signed on 11 February 1958. On 10 October 1958, Sorí Marin assisted Castro in the passing of Law No. 2, that promoted a boycott against a presidential election due on 3 November 1958. He was instrumental in passing Law No. 3, that promoted agrarian reform, a policy originally espoused by Castro in 1953. He served in the rebel army with the rank of major, and by December 1958 had been promoted to comandante, with the title of Judge Advocate General.

== Revolutionary government ==
After the success of the Cuban Revolution on 1 January 1959, he was appointed minister of agriculture, under prime minister José Miró Cardona and president Manuel Urrutia Lleó. Sorí Marín was the chief judge in the 1959 war crimes trials of Havana. On 23 January 1959, alongside two other judges, he presided over the televised trial of Major Jesús Sosa Blanco. On 13 February, Fidel Castro was appointed prime minister, and ordered a re-trial for Sosa Blanco after unfavourable worldwide reactions. At a re-trial on 18 February, Sorí Marín again pronounced a death sentence on Sosa Blanco, that was carried out within hours.

While minister of agriculture, he hoped to retain some elements of private land ownership, and held talks with agriculture representatives of the US embassy. Among his appointees as regional directors of agricultural development was Manuel Artime Buesa, who covertly organized anti-communist activities.

He helped to develop the draft of the Agrarian Reform Laws of Cuba in collaboration with Che Guevara, but was absent when the cabinet agreed final approval of the act. In May 1959, after the law was enacted, he resigned as minister, and joined Manuel Artime, Tony Varona, Carlos Prío and Aureliano Sánchez Arango in their subversive campaign to reduce communist influences in the government and armed forces. Huber Matos, head of the rebel army in Camagüey Province, resigned in October 1959, and was soon arrested. Within days, Sorí Marín, Aldo Vera Serafin and many of their fellow anti-communists left Cuba to re-group in the United States. Sorí Marín, with much support from CIA officer E. Howard Hunt, developed plans to increase armed terrorist activities in Cuba, and to overthrow the Castro administration. While in Miami, he became a leading organizer in the Frente Revolucionario Democratico (FRD).

== Revolutionary invasion ==
On the night of 13 March 1961, Sorí Marín, Rafael Diaz Hanscom, Manuel Puig Millar, Nemesio Rodriguez Navarrete and Gaspar Domingo Trueba Varona landed from a boat at Fundora Point, Celimar, near Havana, with arms and explosives. On 18 March, the insurgents, with Rogelio González Corzo and other members of the Front for Revolutionary Unity (FRU), met in Siboney neighborhood, Havana. Cuban state security (G-2) officers raided the meeting, and arrested all 11 people there, during which Sorí Marín was shot and wounded.

Aldo Vera, a former revolutionary state security officer, and other members of the FRU continued to organize terrorist attacks, that included the El Encanto fire, and they also planned to rescue Sorí Marín and others from detention. Shortly before the Bay of Pigs Invasion, G-2 officers arrested many of the group. On 20 April 1961, after the invasion failed, Sorí Marín was executed by firing squad.

== See also ==
- Frank Sturgis
- Pedro Luis Díaz Lanz

== Bibliography ==
- Castro, Juanita; as told to María Antonieta Collins. 2009. Fidel y Raul - Mis Hermanos, La Historia Secreta (in Es). Santillana USA Publishing Company Inc. ISBN 978-1-60396-701-3
- Dorschner, John. Who And Where Are All These People Who Once Revolved Around Fidel Castro's World?, Miami Herald, December 27, 1998
- Dubois, Jules. 1959, 2009. Fidel Castro: Rebel, Liberator or Dictator?. Kessinger ISBN 0-548-45274-1
- Escalante, Fabián. 1995. The secret war : CIA covert operations against Cuba. 1959-62. Ocean ISBN 1-875284-86-9
- Lazo, Mario. 1968, 1970. Dagger in the heart: American policy failures in Cuba. Twin Circle. New York. 1968 edition Library of Congress number 6831632, 1970 edition, ASIN B0007DPNJS
- The New York Times. 15 October 1958. Threat By Castro On Vote Explained
- Rodriguez, Juan Carlos. 1999. Bay of Pigs and the CIA. Ocean Press ISBN 1-875284-98-2
- St. George, Andrew. 12 April 1964. The Attempt to assassinate Castro. Parade Magazine
- Thomas, Hugh. 1971, 1986. The Cuban Revolution. Weidenfeld and Nicolson (Shortened version of Cuba: The Pursuit of Freedom, includes all history 1952–1970) ISBN 0-297-78954-6
- Waters, Mary Alice. 1999. Making History: Interviews with Four Generals of Cuba's Revolutionary Armed Forces. Pathfinder ISBN 0-87348-902-0
