= Coletilla =

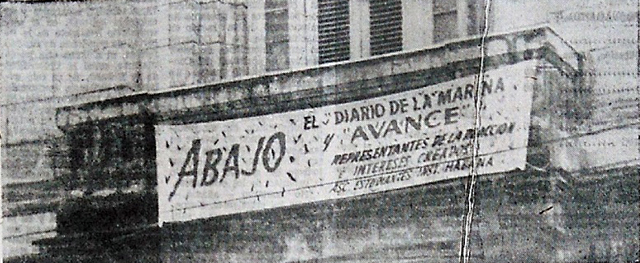
Banner denouncing the magazines Diario de la Marina and Avance. Targets of press regulation and later censorship.

A coletilla (Spanish word meaning: "tagline", in English), is the term used in the English language to describe the political disclaimers published in Cuban newspapers, in the immediate aftermath of the Cuban Revolution. The coletillas began in early 1959 at the behest of government controlled print unions. These unions would demand from their managers that their respective newspapers be published with taglines such as: "This article has been published out of respect for press freedom. However, the workers of this newspaper warn that this information neither follows the truth nor complies, even at minimum, with the most elementary journalism standards". After the government seizure of Cuban newspapers in 1960, coletillas were no longer applied.

== Background ==
During the Cuban Revolution, major Cuban magazines like Bohemia, and Diario de la Marina, were prohibited by the Batista regime from reporting on state torture. Because of state censors, many Cuban people read the newspaper Revolucion, and listened to the radio station Radio Rebelde. Both outlets were operated by Cuban rebels, and thus were free from state censorship. In the aftermath of the Cuban Revolution in 1959, the magazine Lunes de Revolucion was established, as a literary review, complementary to the older newspaper Revolucion. Lunes de Revolucion became the most widely read literary review in Latin America.

In the wake of the Huber Matos affair, a scandal in which military commander Huber Matos resigned over communist influence in the government, the main Cuban newspapers Prensa Libre, El Avance, and Diario de la Marina, published stories critical of Huber Matos. Despite this response, Castro still lamented that there was a media conspiracy against his government. Soon after, printers unions dominated by Popular Socialist Party members, began a campaign of harassment against newspaper managers.

== Implementation ==
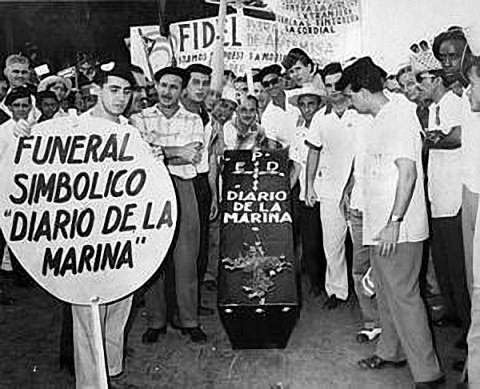
Symbolic funeral for magazine Diario de la Marina.

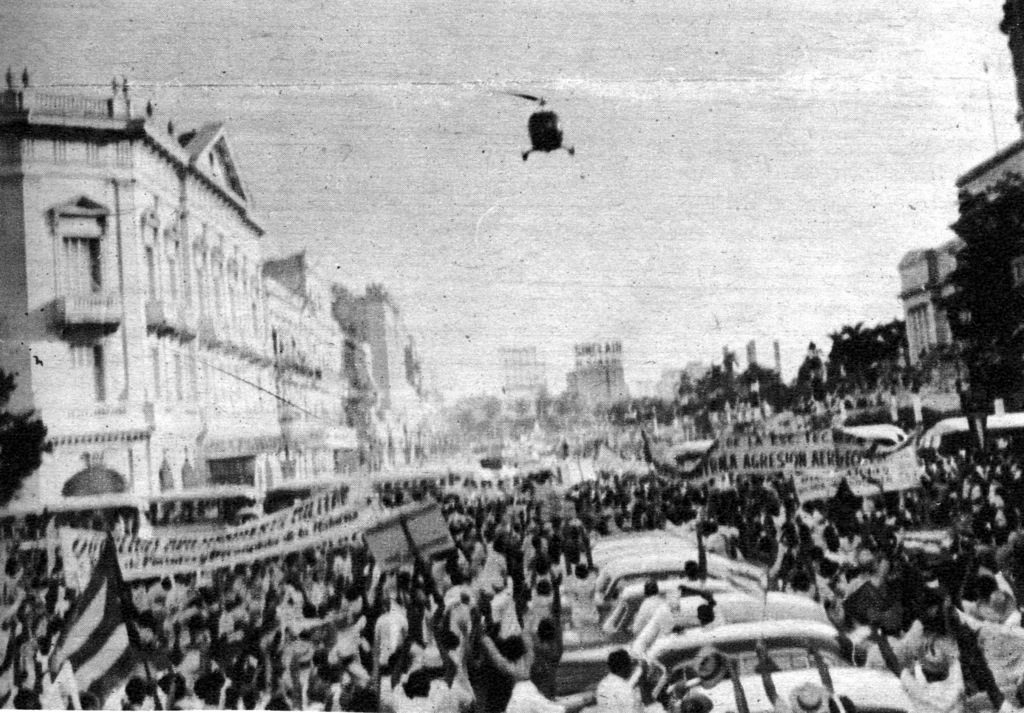
Mob outside Diario de la Marina printing headquarters.

The appearance of coletillas began appearing in the wake of the Huber Matos affair of 1959. By the end of year, print workers at Informacion refused to print foreign wire reports that compared Che Guevara to Adolf Hitler, and demanded the right to add their own commentary to the publication. On Christmas Eve, women of Vilma Espin's Federation of Cuban Women burned newspapers they found repulsive. On January 19, 1960, Castro officially declared his approval for the demands of workers at Informacion to add clarifications to the publication.

Soon after, the writer Mario Llerena wrote an article for Prensa Libre, where he compared the political consolidation in Cuba, to the communist takeover of Czechoslovakia. The article received a lengthy coletilla, which Llerena then responded to in another article, criticizing the anonymous quality of coletillas.

On May 11, 1960, the publishers of Diario de la Marina, the Rivero family, refused to publish a coletilla in the latest issue of the newspaper. The next day, the National Federation of Graphic Workers seized the newspaper. The Rivero family challenged the seizure in court. On May 27, 1960, the seizure was defended by the court, because it was apparently conducted in "the national interest". A protest was also conducted in which a coffin was marched from the newspaper office to the University of Havana. The Rivero family emigrated from Cuba shortly after this court ruling.

By the end of 1960, Avance, El Pais, and Bohemia, were seized by the printers union, and put under government control. TV, and radio stations, were also put under government control.

== Aftermath ==
While private media declined, government sponsored media remained. This media was allowed a sort of pluralism of opinion, as long as the opinion was ultimately loyal to the government. This status quo was reaffirmed in Fidel Castro's speech: "Words to the Intellectuals", in June 1960, given in the aftermath of the censoring of the film P.M..

In the speech "Word to the Intellectuals", Castro commented on freedom of opinion, stating:

Nothing against the Revolution, because the Revolution has its rights also, and the first right of the Revolution is the right to exist, and no one can stand against the right of the Revolution to be and to exist, No one can rightfully claim a right against the Revolution. Since it takes in the interests of the people and Signifies the interests of the entire nation.

By 1965, pluralism of opinion was reduced during a press restructuring and La Granma became the main newspaper of the country.

== See also ==
- Revolution first, elections later
