= Felipe Pazos =

Cuban economist (1912–2001)

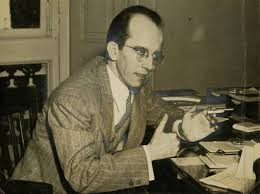
- Felipe Pazos Roque (1953)

President of the National Bank of Cuba
- In office 1950 – April 1952
- Preceded by: Position established
- Succeeded by: Joaquín Martínez Sáenz
- In office January 1959 – November 1959
- Preceded by: Joaquín Martínez Sáenz
- Succeeded by: Che Guevara

Personal details
- Born: Felipe Pazos Roque; 27 September 1912 Havana, Cuba
- Died: 26 February 2001 (aged 88) Ciudad Guayana, Venezuela
- Education: University of Havana
- Occupation: Economist

Felipe Pazos Roque (27 September 1912 – 26 February 2001) was a Cuban economist who initially supported the Cuban Revolution of Fidel Castro, but became disillusioned with the increasingly radical nature of the revolutionary government.

== Biography ==
Born in Havana, Pazos earned a doctorate from the University of Havana in 1938. He was a member of the Cuban delegation to the 1944 Bretton Woods conference. In 1946, he joined the staff of the fledgling International Monetary Fund that had been established at the Bretton Woods conference. He worked there for three years before returning to Cuba in 1950 to head the newly established National Bank of Cuba for two years at the behest of Cuban President Carlos Prío Socarrás.

After Fulgencio Batista took power in Cuba through a military coup d'état in 1952, Pazos became active in supporting the resistance against Batista. Batista's rule came under increasing assault during the 1950s, and he and the Cuban military soon found themselves fighting against a young Castro and the forces of his 26th of July Movement. At the time, Castro was waging a guerrilla campaign in the mountainous Sierra Maestra region of Cuba. Batista had declared that Castro had been killed; however, Pazos arranged for The New York Times reporter Herbert Matthews to come and meet Castro in February 1957. The resulting interview refuted Batista's claims, and gave Castro and his revolutionaries international attention. In July 1957, Castro convened a meeting in the Sierra Maestra between his group of rebels and pro-Capitalist representatives, including Pazos. Pazos' signature on the 12 July Sierra Manifesto was meant to help reassure the Cuban people that the revolutionaries were not radical ideologues. Pazos and his family were forced to flee Cuba soon after its release.

After Castro's victory in 1959, Pazos returned to Cuba and once again headed the National Bank of Cuba. However, he soon found himself becoming increasingly disillusioned with the new Cuban government. In April 1959, Castro and his aides, including Pazos, visited the United States. Many had suspected that the purpose of the visit was to ask for economic aid, but Castro forbade Pazos from making any such requests. Pazos privately expressed his frustrations to officials at the U.S. State Department and Treasury Department.

Pazos' confidence was further weakened when Castro ordered the arrest and imprisonment in October 1959 of Huber Matos, an anti-Communist revolutionary who had recently resigned from office. After Castro angrily denounced the United States for being complicit in the "bombing" of Havana with thousands of anti-Castro leaflets by the ex-Air Force Chief Pedro Luis Diaz Lanz, Pazos decided to resign. He tendered his resignation to President Osvaldo Dorticós Torrado on 23 October 1959. Pazos transferred the Presidency of the National Bank of Cuba to Che Guevara on 26 November 1959, and was allowed to leave Cuba soon afterward.

== Later years and death ==
Pazos ended up working at the Alliance for Progress and the Inter-American Development Bank, writing many economic articles on Latin America, before retiring in 1975 to Venezuela. He died in Puerto Ordaz in 2001. He had three sons and a daughter. His son Felipe Jr. starred alongside Spencer Tracy in the 1958 film adaptation of Ernest Hemingway's The Old Man and the Sea.
