= Rafael Quintero =

Cuban CIA operative

Rafael "Chi Chi" Quintero
- Born: September 16, 1940; Camagüey, Cuba
- Died: October 1, 2006 (aged 66); Baltimore, Maryland, U.S.
- Occupation: CIA operative
- Organization: Central Intelligence Agency
- Known for: Anti-Castro operations, Bay of Pigs Invasion, Operation 40, Iran–Contra affair
- Movement: Cuban exile

Rafael "Chi Chi" Quintero Ibaria (September 16, 1940 – October 1, 2006) was a CIA operative.

== Biography ==
Quintero was born in Camagüey, Cuba on September 16, 1940. In the 1950s, he joined the resistance movement against Cuban dictator Fulgencio Batista. A few days prior to the Cuban Revolution he joined Fidel Castro's group in the Sierra Maestra.

After becoming dissatisfied with the Castro regime, he joined Manuel Artime against Castro. Artime's group was supported by Frank Sturgis and the CIA as related by Fabian Escalante in CIA Covert Operations: 1959 - 1962. Sturgis flew a CIA plane over Havana, dropping thousands of pamphlets urging the Cuban people to overthrow the Castro regime on October 21, 1959, as part of Artime's operations. About December 1959, Manuel Artime left Cuba with a hundred thousand pesos when nothing happened. Quintero moved to the United States the next month.

On June 5, 1960, The Movement for the Recovery of the Revolution or (MRR) was created by Manuel Artime, Tony Varona, Aureliano Arango, José Miró Cardona and Quintero. Around the same time, Quintero became a member of Operation 40 along with other anti-Castro Cubans. In 1961 Quintero secretly re-entered Cuba and was arrested just before the Bay of Pigs Invasion, was released and returned to the U.S.

Rafael Quintero served as deputy leader of MRR under Artime in 1962. Manuel Artime got money from the CIA through Theodore Shackley in 1963. Artime, Quintero and Félix Rodríguez moved to Nicaragua creating an army of 300 men and obtained weapons, supplies and boats to invade Cuba.

Quintero died in Baltimore, Maryland after a history of kidney failure.
