= Ministry of Justice (Cuba) =

Government ministry of Cuba

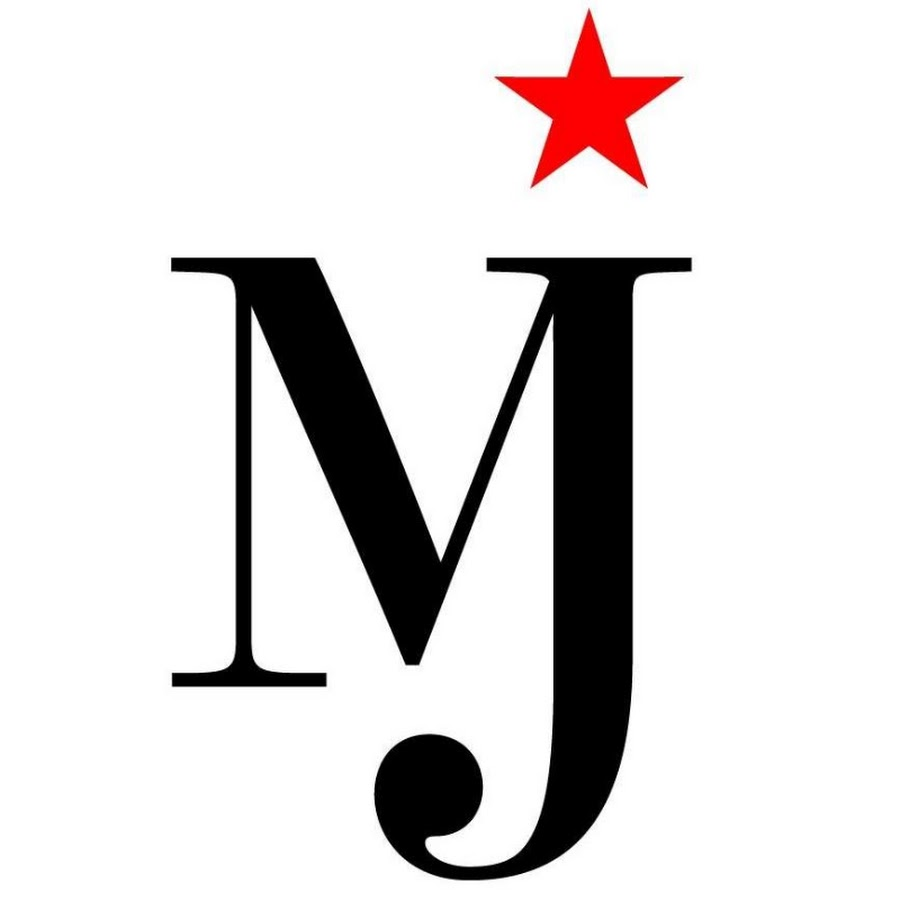
logo of the ministry

The Ministry of Justice of the Republic of Cuba (Spanish: inisterio de Justicia de la República de Cuba), known by the acronym MINJUS, is the Cuban government ministry which oversees the legal policy of Cuba. The Minister of Justice, who heads the ministry, is a member of the Council of Ministers in Cuba. The current ministry was founded in 1959. Its headquarters are located at Calle O # 216 between 23rd and 25th Streets, Vedado, Plaza de la Revolución in Havana.

== Mission ==
The Ministry of Justice of Cuba is responsible for the following functions:

- Guide and coordinate the preparation and execution of the Legislative Plan of the State and the Government.
- Participate in legal and legislative advice to the State, the Government and the OACE (Central Administration of the State) and other state institutions.
- Evaluate, in coordination with other bodies, agencies and institutions, the effectiveness of legal norms.
- Promote the procedures for the review of final sentences in criminal matters, the granting of extraordinary conditional freedom, decree the expulsion of sanctioned foreigners from the national territory and cancel criminal records.
- To pronounce on the validity of the legal norms.
- Direct and control technically, normatively and methodologically the exercise of notarial functions.
- Direct and control the registry policy of public records and regulate their operation, in coordination with the corresponding agencies.
- Represent the State in the legal procedures of partition, adjudication, segregation, recasting and registration of real estate.
- Create and organize the "Claims Commissions" under the provisions of Law No.80 of 1996.
- Establish the technical-methodological guidelines for the legal advisors of the OACE, state institutions and entities of the cooperative and private sector.
- Regulate the services provided by the Legal Consultancy.
- Exercise the functions that the Law establishes regarding the services provided by the ONBC (collective law offices).
- Regulate the legal assistance services provided by civil service societies.
- Address the legal issues arising from relations with ecclesiastical or religious institutions.
- Guide and control the application of the policy in matters of associations and foundations.
- Represent the State before associations in which the ministry is a relationship organ.
- Direct the edition, printing and circulation of the Official Gazette of the Republic.
- Promote the development of Legal Information Technology.
- Participate, with the corresponding bodies and organizations, in the dissemination of the Law and contribute to the legal formation of the people.

== List of ministers (Post-1959) ==
- Angel Fernandez Rodriguez (1959)
- Alfredo Yabur Maluf (1959-1972)
- Armando Torres Santrayl (1973-1979)
- Osvaldo Dorticos Torrado (10 January 1980 – 23 June 1983)
- Hector Garcin y Guerra (1983)
- Ramon de la Cruz Ochoa (1983)
- Mercedes Castro (1983)
- Juan Escalona Reguera (1983-1990)
- Carlos Amat Fores (1990-1996)
- Roberto Diaz Sotolongo (1996-2007)
- Maria Esther Reus Gonzalez (2007–2018) [1st female]
- Oscar Manuel Silveira Martínez (2018-present)

== See also ==
- Justice ministry
- Politics of Cuba
