= Carlos Manuel Piedra =

Cuban politician (1895–1988)

Carlos Modesto Piedra
- Carlos Manuel Piedra, 1959

President of Cuba Interim
- In office January 1, 1959
- Preceded by: Fulgencio Batista
- Succeeded by: Manuel Urrutia

Personal details
- Born: 1895 Spanish Cuba
- Died: 1988 (aged 92–93) Havana, Cuba
- Spouse: Maria Luisa Martinez Diaz
- Children: Isis, Flavia
- Profession: Attorney; Judge, Cuban Supreme Court

Carlos Manuel Piedra y Piedra (or Carlos Modesto Piedra y Piedra) (1895–1988) was a Cuban politician who served as the Interim President of Cuba for nearly a day (January 1, 1959) during the transition of power between Fulgencio Batista and revolutionary leader Fidel Castro in the Cuban Revolution. Piedra was appointed interim president by a junta led by Major General Eulogio Cantillo in accordance with the 1940 Cuban Constitution. Piedra had previously been the eldest judge of the Supreme Court. The appointment of Piedra, the last president to be born under Spanish Cuba, was met with opposition from Castro, who believed that Manuel Urrutia should be appointed.

He was married to María Luisa Martínez Díaz and had two daughters, Isis and Flavia Piedra Martínez.
