= Manuel Artime =

Leader of the Bay of Pigs invasion (1932–1977)

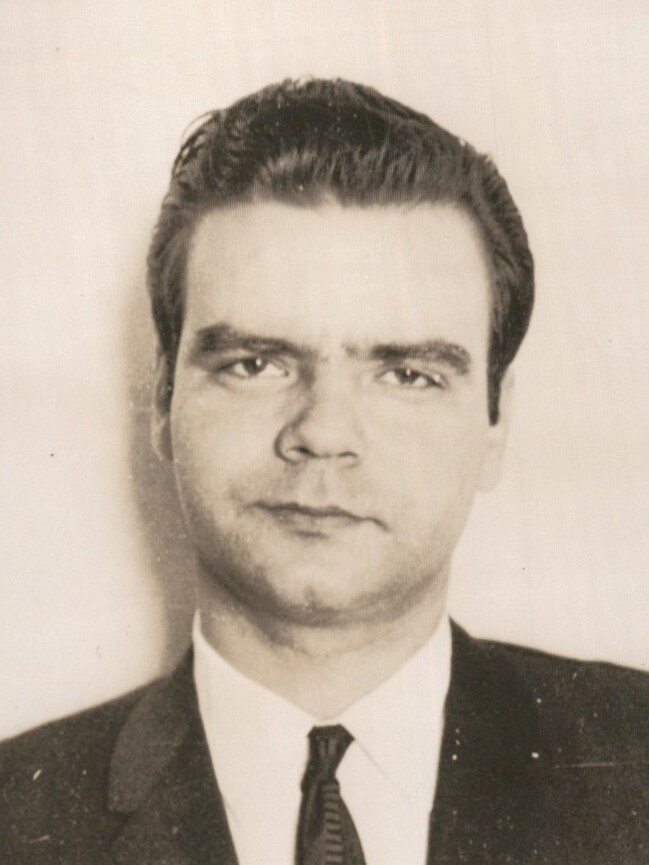
- Artime in 1961

Personal details
- Born: Manuel Francisco Artime Buesa; 29 January 1932 Cuba
- Died: 18 November 1977 (aged 45) Miami, Florida, U.S.
- Resting place: Caballero Rivero Woodlawn North Park Cemetery and Mausoleum, Miami

Military service
- Allegiance: 26th of July Movement; Cuba; United States
- Branch/service: Revolutionary Armed Forces
- Years of service: 1953–1959 (26JM); 1959 (Cuba); 1959–1965 (United States)
- Unit: Brigade 2506 (1961)
- Battles/wars: Cuban Revolution; Bay of Pigs Invasion

Manuel Francisco Artime Buesa, M.D. (29 January 1932 – 18 November 1977) was a Cuban-American who was a former member of the rebel army of Fidel Castro but later was the political leader of Brigade 2506 land forces in the abortive Bay of Pigs invasion of Cuba in April 1961.

== Biography ==
Manuel Artime was the nephew of popular Cuban poet José Ángel Bueza, and was raised as a devout Catholic by Jesuits. In 1957 he became a member of the Radical Liberation Party (PLR), a Christian democratic group. He graduated as a doctor and planned to become a psychiatrist.

In December 1958 he joined the rebel army of Fidel Castro and took part in offensives against the forces of the Batista regime at Guisa, Maffo and Palma Soriano. In January 1959, after the triumph of the Cuban Revolution, Artime was appointed second in command of Zone 0–22 in the Ciro Redondo district in the Manzanillo region at INRA (Instituto Nacional de Reforma Agraria). In that post, under Major Humberto Sorí Marin, Minister of Agriculture, and Rogelio Gonzalez Corzo (alias "Francisco Gutierrez"), Director of Agriculture, Artime promoted the work of the Comandos Rurales (Rural Commandos), a kind of Peace Corps composed of young people, most of whom belonged to the University Catholic Group (ACU) in Havana. Both Sorí Marin and Rogelio Gonzalez were captured on the eve of the Bay of Pigs Invasion and executed on 20 April 1961. Artime was also a professor at the Havana Military Academy. During 1959, Artime formed the Movimiento de Recuperación Revolucionaria (MRR) (in English - Movement of Revolutionary Recovery) that included Rogelio Gonzalez Corzo, Higinio "Nino" Diaz, Jorge Sotus, Sergio Sanjenis, Rafael Rivas Vazquez, Carlos Rodriguez Santana, some of whom were already exiled in Mexico.

In October 1959, after the arrest and trial of Commander Huber Matos of the Cuban revolutionary army, the Cuban intelligence unit G-2 began searching for other counter-revolutionaries. Artime took asylum with the Jesuits in Havana, and on 7 November 1959 his resignation letter from INRA and the revolutionary army was published on the front page of Avance newspaper. Artime then contacted the American embassy in Havana, and on 14 December 1959, the CIA arranged for him to travel to the US on a Honduran freighter ship. He became closely involved with Gerry Droller (alias Frank Bender, alias "Mr B") of the CIA in recruiting and organizing Cuban exiles in Miami for future actions against the Cuban government. Artime's organization MRR thus grew to become the principal counter-revolutionary movement inside Cuba, with supporting members in Miami, Mexico, Venezuela etc. Involved were Tony Varona, José Miró Cardona, Rafael Quintero, Aureliano Sánchez Arango. Infiltration into Cuba, arms drops, etc. were arranged by the CIA.

In May 1960 he was one of a group of ten former Cuban officers in Miami planning a campaign against the Cuban government. They were all graduates of Cuba's military academy, the Cadet School. On 2 June 1960, Artime and nine fellow 'recruits' were transported by CIA agents to Useppa Island off Fort Myers, Florida, for physical and psychological assessments. On 22 June 1960 Artime and 27 others were taken by land and air to Fort Gulick in Panama for paramilitary training. On 22 August 1960 he flew via CIA C-54 transport aircraft to San Jose, Guatemala. On 15 April 1961, José Miró Cardona, chairman of the New York-based Cuban Revolutionary Council confirmed Manuel Artime as its Economic Administrator and "Delegate in the Invading Army". On 17 April 1961 he went ashore with Brigade 2506, the assault brigade of Cuban exiles, at Playa Larga in the Bay of Pigs Invasion. After the Brigade had ceased fighting on 19 April 1961, he and others scattered into the woods and swamps near Playa Girón. On 2 May 1961, he was captured by Cuban forces near the Covadonga sugar mill with 21 other members of the Brigade. Artime, along with everyone else captured in the failed invasion, was sentenced to 30 years in a prison during a mass treason trial. He was finally released from prison and flown to Miami on 24 December 1962. On 29 December 1962, Manuel Artime was on stage next to US President John F. Kennedy at the Orange Bowl in Miami, Florida, during the 'welcome back' ceremony for captured Brigade 2506 veterans.

At the initiative of US Attorney General Robert F. Kennedy, he became involved in the Cuban project AMWORLD, a White House-sponsored and CIA-organized counter-revolutionary unit with bases in Costa Rica and Nicaragua that staged commando raids on Cuban shore installations. Artime was the "Project head" of AMWORLD, going by the cryptonym "AMBIDDY/1". However, in 1964 the Cuban Project was cancelled by US President Lyndon B. Johnson. Artime participated in a failed assassination attempt against Fidel Castro in 1965. In the 1970s Artime organized the Miami Watergate Defense Relief Fund, collecting $21,000 for the convicted Watergate burglars, a number of whom were American or Cuban veterans of the Bay of Pigs operation. Artime was very close to E. Howard Hunt and was godfather to Hunt's youngest son David. Manuel Artime died of cancer on 18 November 1977.

He is buried at Woodlawn Park Cemetery and Mausoleum, now Caballero Rivero Woodlawn North Park Cemetery and Mausoleum, in Miami.

In the 2023 HBO Max miniseries White House Plumbers, as a friend of E. Howard Hunt, is portrayed by Steven Bauer.

== Gallery ==
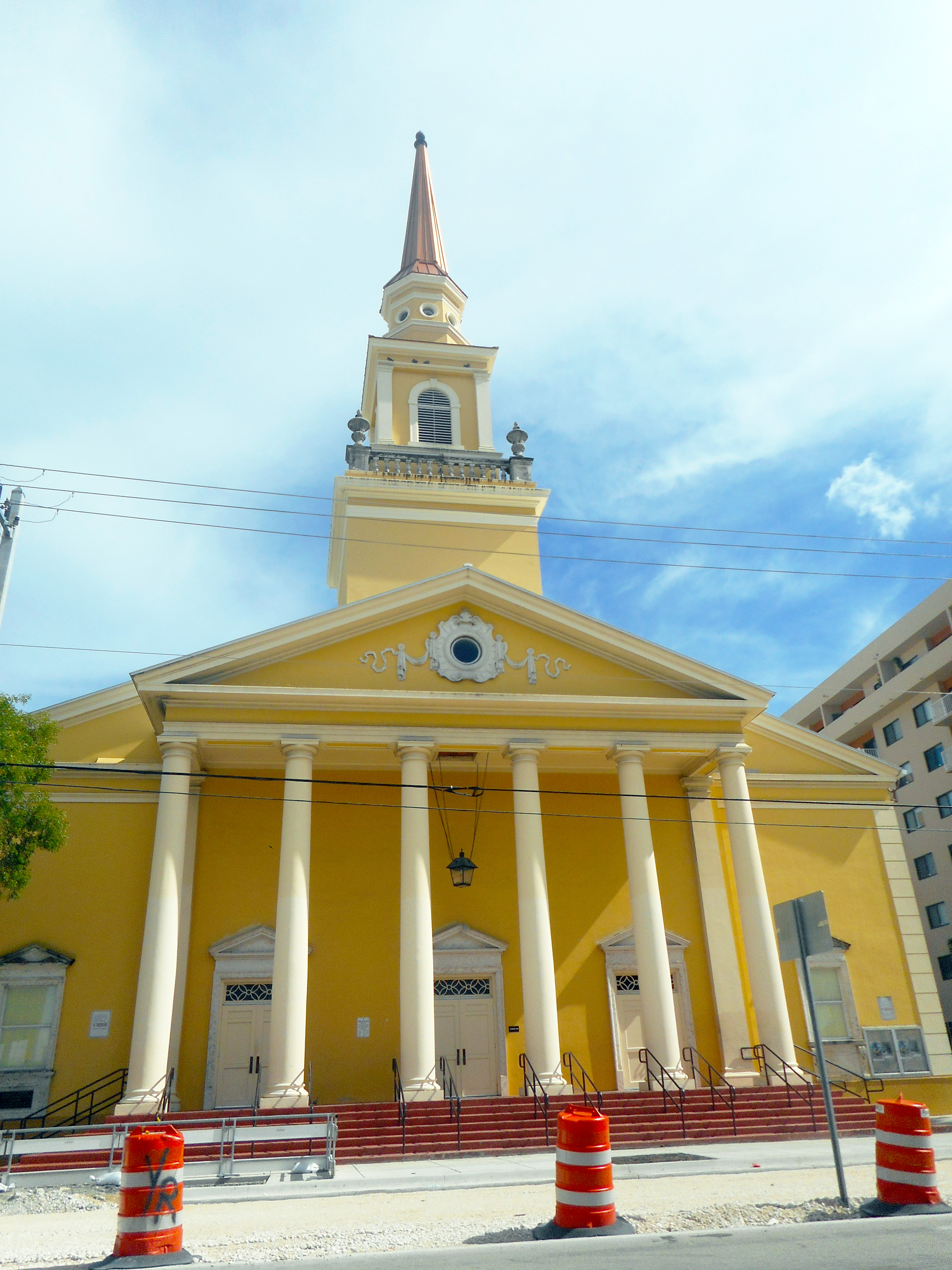
Manuel Artime Theater in the Little Havana Neighborhood during reconstruction of SW 1st Street

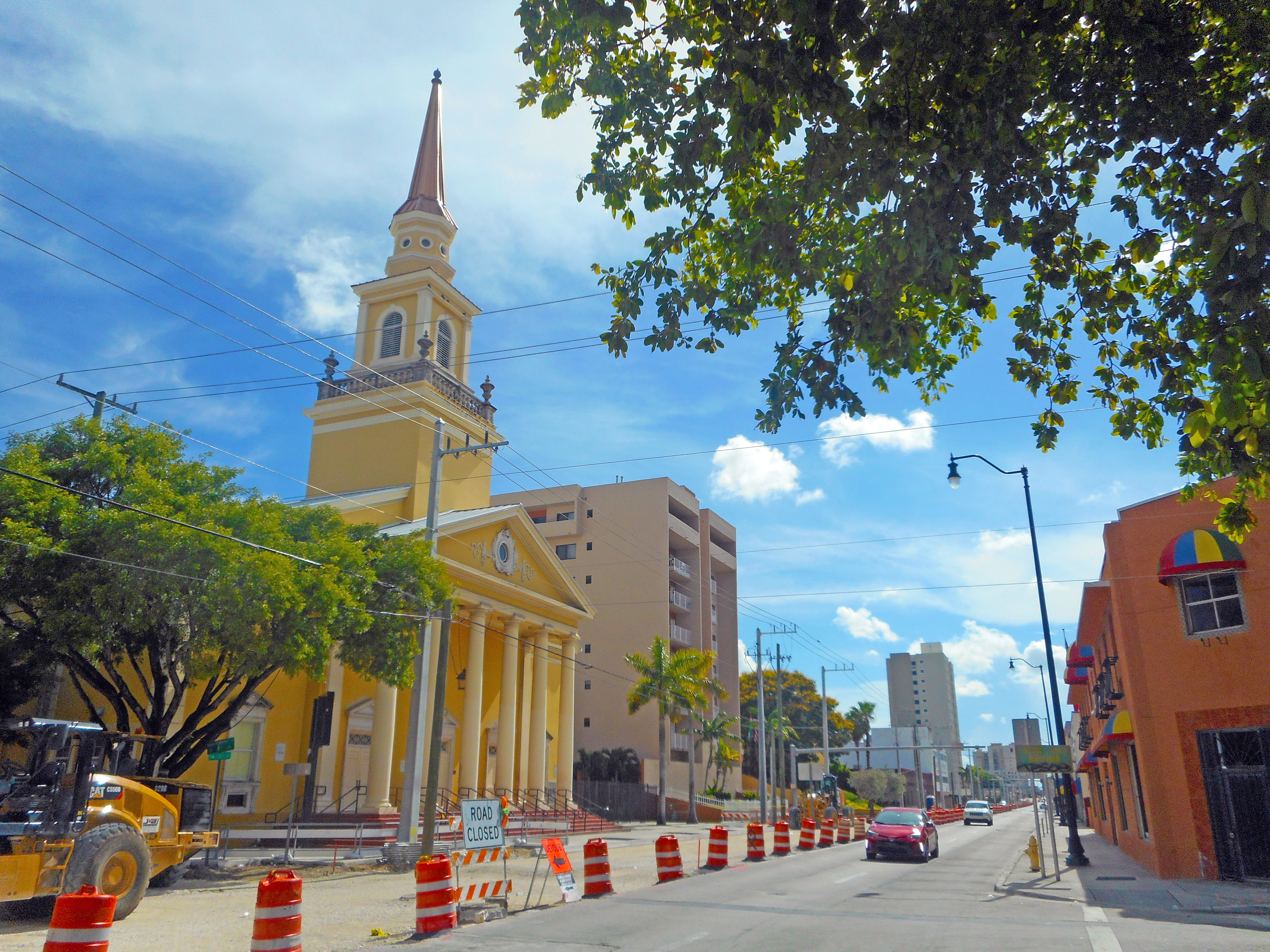
View west from SW 1st Street

== See also ==
- Pedro Luis Díaz Lanz
- Humberto Sori Marin
