= Cienfuegos Yacht Club =

Yacht club

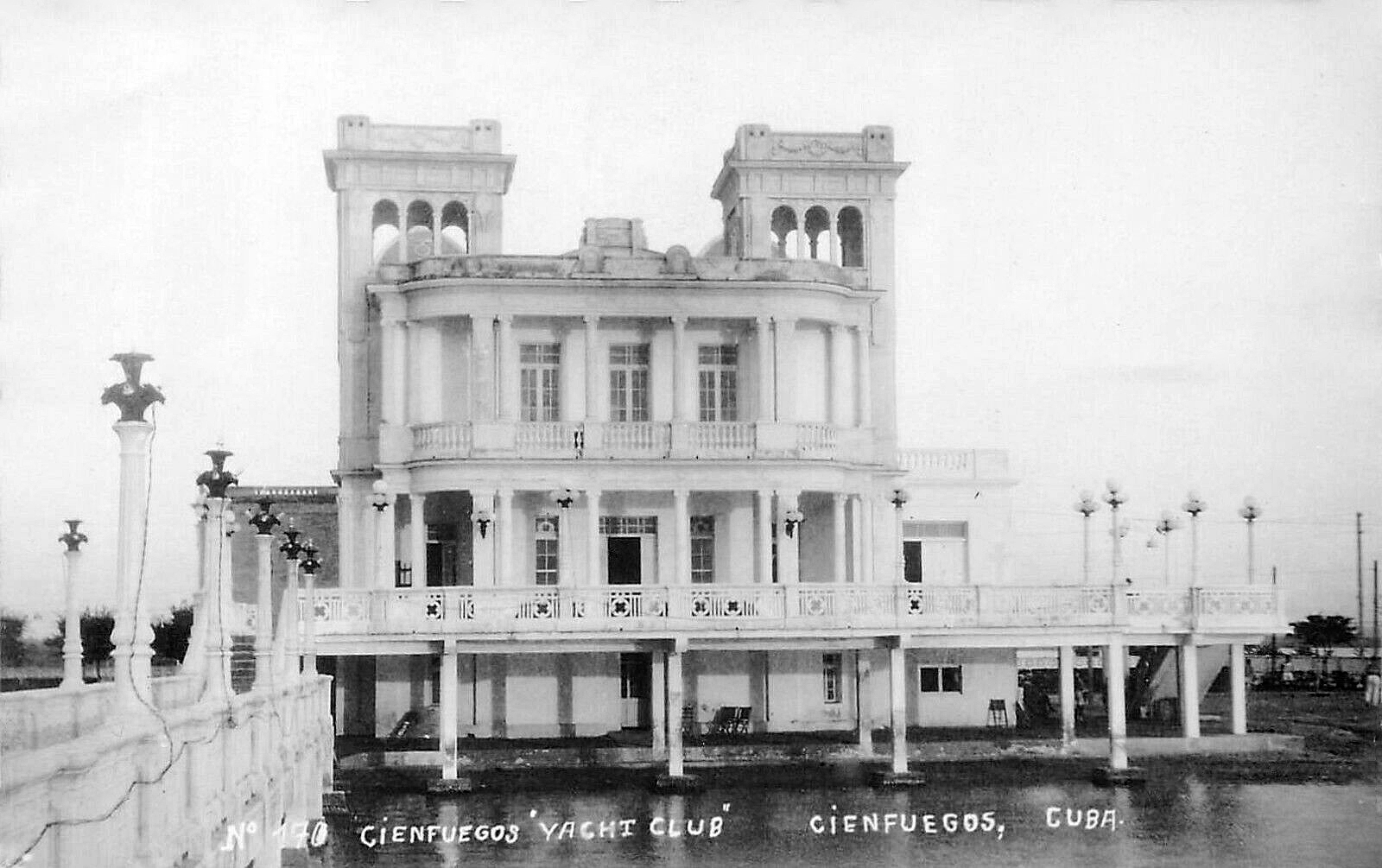
- Alternative names: CYC

General information
- Location: Cienfuegos, Cienfuegos Province, Cuba
- Coordinates: 22°7′35.29″N 80°27′4.46″W
- Opened: 1918

Cienfuegos Yacht Club was an exclusive yacht and social club in Cienfuegos, Cuba.

== Early history ==
The Cienfuegos Yacht Club was established in the summer of 1918. It was set up to host regattas in Cienfuegos Bay and to represent Cienfuegos in competitions held in other Cuban cities. The Cienfuegos Club first participated in inter-club events with the Havana Yacht Club in 1921.

The club offered a sailing center, an outdoor swimming pool built in the bay, a tennis court, and other social amenities.

Many types of athletes, such as those participating in track and field, softball, and rowing competitions, called the club home.

The nautical club entered a crew in the National rowing regatta for the 1926 Championships of the United States on the Schuylkill River in Philadelphia. The Cienfuegos Yacht Club represented Cuba in the four-with-coxswain racing event in the 1959 Pan American Games.

The building was later converted into a restaurant and renamed Club Cienfuegos.

== Presidents ==
- Dr. Francisco Dorticos Pichardo
- Osvaldo Dorticos Torrado
