= Gerry Droller =

German-American spymaster (c.1905–1992)

- Born: Gerald Droller; 1905? Germany
- Died: 1992 (aged 86–87)
- Occupation: CIA official
- Espionage activity
- Allegiance: United States
- Service branch: CIA
- Codename: Frank Bender
- Codename: Gerry Drecher
- Codename: Mister B
- Codename: Don Federico

Gerard "Gerry" Droller (1905? - 1992) was a German CIA officer involved in the covert 1954 Guatemalan coup d'état and the recruitment of Cuban exiles in the preparation of the Bay of Pigs Invasion in April 1961.

== Biography ==
Gerard Droller was born in Germany. He worked with Office of Strategic Services (OSS) and the Maquis in France during World War II.

On 21 April 1959, Droller had a three-hour meeting with Fidel Castro in a hotel room in New York City after the latter's visit to Washington.

In June 1960, Droller was sent to Miami, as Chief Political Action (C/WH/4/PA) under Jacob Esterline to help organize the overthrow of Fidel Castro in Cuba. Adopting the name Frank Bender, he posed as a wealthy steel tycoon. His main task was to recruit and organize the political leaders of anti-Castro Cuban exiles in the Miami area, assisted by E. Howard Hunt alias "Eduardo". He recruited Manuel Artime who became the leader of Movimiento de Recuperación Revolucionaria (Revolutionary Recovery Movement), (MRR), and later Brigade 2506. During 1960 and 1961, Droller organized the setting up of training camps for Cuban exiles at Useppa Island, Florida, and at Retalhuleu, Guatemala by arrangement with Guatemalan president Miguel Ydigoras. He helped recruit Cuban exiles into a paramilitary force subsequently named Brigade 2506 that, with considerable finance from the CIA, carried out the abortive invasion of Cuba at the Bay of Pigs on 17 April 1961. He did not speak Spanish, and he was not universally liked by the Cuban exiles.

== See also ==
- CIA activities in Guatemala
- Cuban Project
