= Mario Llerena =

Cuban intellectual (1913–2006)

Rafael Mario Ramón Llerena (March 5, 1913 – December 10, 2006) was a Cuban intellectual who worked alongside Fidel Castro to topple Fulgencio Batista but, opposing communism, broke with Castro after he gained power.

== Biography ==
Llerena was born in Placetas, Las Villas. Intending to become a Christian minister, he attended Princeton Theological Seminary, but then switched careers. He taught Spanish at Duke University before returning to Cuba. He also received a doctorate of philosophy and letters from the University of Havana.

Llerena met Castro in the 1950s, and at his request wrote a document, "Nuestra Razón", explaining the democratic ideals of the uprising Castro was planning. In 1957, he was named chairman of the New York branch of the July 26 Movement, and played a pivotal role in circumventing Batista's attempts at censorship during the uprising.

Citing ideological differences, he resigned from the movement before Castro's triumph on January 1, 1959. He criticized Castro's shift toward Communism, and ultimately fled the country in 1960. He became a strong voice among other exiles, publishing numerous essays and a book in 1978 called The Unsuspected Revolution: The Birth and Rise of Castroism, in which he claims many of Castro's followers were deceived by his drift to Communism.

He died in 2006 in Miami, Florida of natural causes.
