= Cuban Revolutionary Council =

Cuban Revolutionary Council Consejo Revolucionario Cubano
- President: José Miró Cardona
- Founded: 8 April 1961
- Headquarters: New York
- Ideology: Anti-communism; Anti-Authoritarianism; Anti-Castroism; Anti-Batista; Liberalism

The Cuban Revolutionary Council (Spanish: Consejo Revolucionario Cubano, CRC) was a group formed, with CIA assistance, three weeks before the April 17, 1961, Bay of Pigs Invasion to "coordinate and direct" the activities of another group known as the Cuban Democratic Revolutionary Front. Both groups were composed of Cuban exiles dedicated to overthrowing Fidel Castro's communist government in Cuba. José Miró Cardona, former Prime Minister of Cuba, was chairman of the Cuban Revolutionary Council. On its board of directors were: Antonio de Varona, Justo Carrillo, Carlos Hevia, Antonio Maceo, Manuel Ray, and Manuel Artime.

The Bay of Pigs Invasion floundered and Miró Cardona, whose son had joined the invasion force, blamed the CIA for the failure. Miró Cardona concluded that the CIA had disregarded resistance groups within Cuba, ignored the paramilitary groups led by Manuel Ray, and misled the Cuban exiles over the role of the U.S. military in the invasion. The Council was supposed to have declared itself a "government in arms" during the invasion, but its failure prevented this from happening. Although they were to serve as the provisional government in a post-Castro Cuba, the CRC had limited knowledge of the invasion itself. As it was soon to begin, the timing of which was unknown to the Council, they were taken to Opa-Locka, Florida and then brought to a house with armed guards. Each Council member was given a duffle bag containing military uniform and equipment, still unaware as to what was occurring despite their inquiries.

The next morning they were surprised to hear an announcement on the radio, signed off by the "Cuban Revolutionary Council", that the invasion had begun. The Council was furious when they heard about the catastrophe of the invasion, reportedly one member was threatening suicide and others were requesting to be sent down to the beach personally. President Kennedy sent Arthur M. Schlesinger Jr. and Adolf Berle to meet with them. Cardona told the pair that the only excuse he could offer the Cuban people was to die with the invasion force, which he requested to be allowed to do. He further blamed the CIA for not consulting with the Council and for not coordinating with Cuban rebels already in Cuba and felt that he had been deceived about the invasion's prospects by the CIA. Next they were taken to Washington for an audience with the President, Kennedy reportedly succeeded in calming down the Council and told them that they were free to go anywhere they wished, ending their detainment. According to Schlesinger Jr., when he informed Kennedy about their detainment in Florida, he said that the CIA had not told him they had been under house arrest.

With CIA funds, two public relations firms were hired, Lem Jones Associates in New York, and Abrams, Osborne and Associates in Miami. These firms issued statements signed by the CRC, although they had been written by the CIA. After the October 1962 missile crisis, the Kennedy administration withdrew much of its support to the Cuban Revolutionary Council and other militant exile groups. However the CIA continued to provide the CRC with $137,000 per month (as recorded in April 1963). In April 1963, Miró Cardona resigned as chairman of the CRC, claiming that Kennedy had chosen a path of peaceful coexistence with Castro's government. He felt that the U.S. had become a "victim of a master play by the Russians" and angrily stated that "the struggle for Cuba is in the process of being liquidated by the Government".

In 1961–62, the New Orleans chapter of the Cuban Revolutionary Council occupied an office in the Newman Building at 544 Camp Street. This was the building where anti-Castro activist and accused JFK Assassination conspirator Guy Banister also had his office. During this period, Banister associate Sergio Arcacha Smith was the "official delegate" for the New Orleans chapter of the CRC.

== See also ==
- Cuban dissident movement
- Cuban Democratic Revolutionary Front
- Directorio Revolucionario Estudiantil
