= Pedro Luis Díaz Lanz =

Cuban Air Force commander (1926–2008)

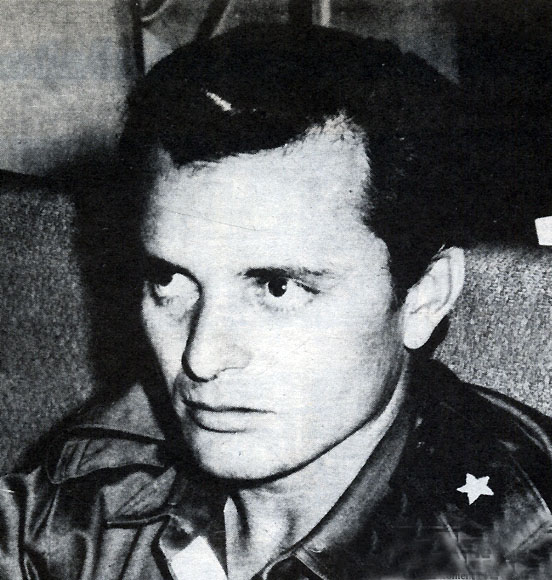
- Pedro Luis Díaz Lanz in 1959
- Born: November 8, 1926
- Died: June 26, 2008
- Allegiance: Cuba
- Branch: Revolutionary Air Force of Cuba
- Rank: Major
- Conflicts: Cuban Revolution

Pedro Luis Díaz Lanz (July 8, 1926 in Havana, Cuba – June 26, 2008 Miami, U.S.) was Chief of the Revolutionary Air Force of Cuba under Fidel Castro, before and after the 1959 Cuban Revolution. He later became disaffected with Castro, defecting to the United States and attempting to overthrow him.

== Life in Cuba ==
Lanz was born on 8 November 1926 to a military family. His grandfather fought with the Mambises against the Spanish colonial forces for Cuba independence, while his father served in the Cuban Constitutional Army until 1930. He was a great-grandson of a sister of the Cuban national hero José Martí. In 1944 he graduated from high school and studied to be an aircraft mechanic. In 1946 he became a commercial pilot for the company Aerovías Q.

In 1957, Pedro Díaz Lanz joined Fidel Castro's rebel group in Santiago, Cuba. He later acted as head of the Revolutionary Air Force, and during 1958 he smuggled weapons and ammunition from Costa Rica and Florida into Cuba by air.

After the Cuban Revolution on 1 January 1959, he was confirmed as head of the new Revolutionary Air Force as well as Castro's personal pilot. Within months, he became vocal about his opposition to the influence of communists on the new revolutionary government. On 29 June 1959, Fidel Castro relieved him of his post, and he left immediately by Revolutionary Air Force airplane he appropriated from a Cuban base under his command and flew to Homestead Air Force Base in Florida with his second wife and 3 of his six children, and reportedly with Frank Sturgis, a fellow anti-communist who played a role in his exfiltration from Cuba. Lanz was a friend of Sturgis, having met him through their arms procurement work for the revolution. When Lanz was made chief of the air force he appointed Sturgis as head of security and intelligence.

== Life after Cuba ==
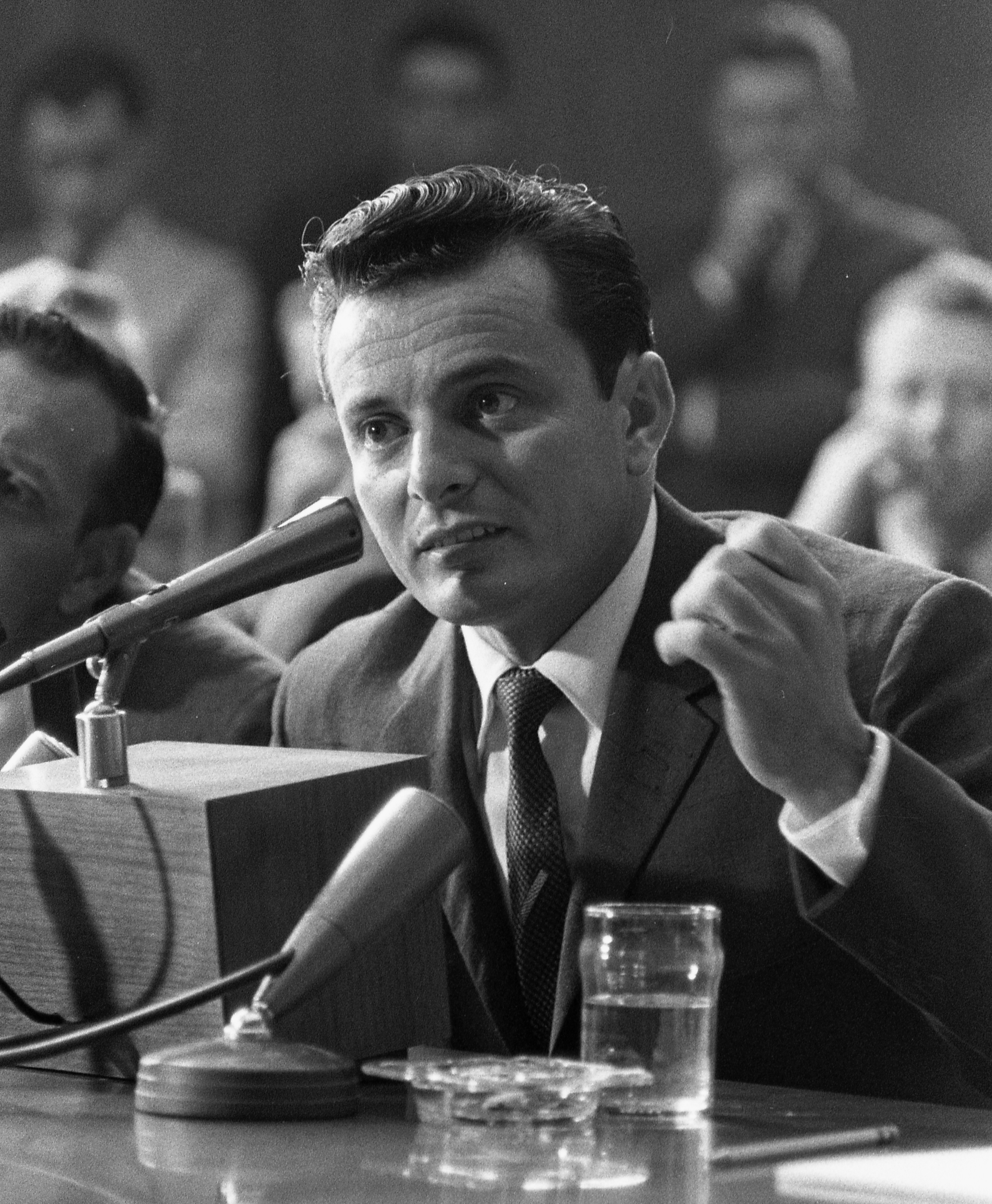
Pedro Luis Díaz Lanz testifying before the US Senate on July 14 1959

On 1 July 1959, Díaz arrived on U.S. shores and requested political asylum after he was dismissed as air force chief. Lanz was the first major defection from the revolutionary government, it was followed by a string internal dissensions such as the resignation of President Urratia and the Huber Matos affair. Castro accused Urrutia and Lanz of participating in an "elaborate plan" to defame his government. At the trial of Huber Matos, he condemned Lanz as a "traitor" and stated that he "took the initiative" by removing him from his post.

On 10 July he testified before the United States Senate Subcommittee on Internal Security in a closed session. Four days later he appeared in an open session. His appearance before the subcommittee received significant coverage in the American press. The political direction of Cuba under Castro was a matter of American speculation at the time, as Castro had not yet publicly stated he was a communist. Lanz testimony that Castro was a communist caused some concern, Senator Kenneth Keating later stated that it "cast the first real doubts in my mind as to what Castro was up to".

Lanz was a member, along with Frank Sturgis and Felix Rodriguez, of the Cuban Constitutional Crusade grouping. On 21 October 1959 he carried out one of his most notorious acts, flying a twin-engined bomber (variously reported as a B-25 or B-26) departing from Florida over Havana while dropping anti-communist leaflets, along with his brother Marcos Diaz Lanz. Pedro Diaz Lanz piloted and Marcos Diaz Lanz threw the leaflets down from an open bomb hatch. The unsuccessful gunfire from armed forces on the ground caused injuries and deaths, leading to unsubstantiated reports of bombs being dropped from the aircraft. The Cuban government published a pamphlet describing the event as Cuba's Pearl Harbor.

By April 1960, he was recruited by the CIA and became a member of Operation 40, a group of CIA operatives who specialized in carrying out secret anti-Castro assassinations and acts of sabotage. Then on May 27 of 1960, the Miami Herald published a list of names of pilots who were placed on a U.S. Government 'Blacklist' thereby prohibiting them from flying to Cuba; on that list was Pedro Luis Diaz Lanz. Throughout the 1960s he was involved in various attempts to sneak weapons into Cuba. In later years Lanz became a critic of the trade unionist Cesar Chavez. In 1969 he accused Chavez of "using the same techniques as the Communists" and of having been "trained by individuals highly trained in Communist indoctrination", pointing to his connections with the "Marxist revolutionary" Saul Alinsky and the "Moscow-trained" Walter Reuther.

Díaz committed suicide with a gunshot wound to the chest in 2008 at the age of 81 after being diagnosed with a fatal illness. He was buried at Woodlawn South Cemetery in Miami.

== See also ==
- Manuel Artime
