= Cuban Democratic Revolutionary Front =

Anti-Castro exile group (1960–61)

- Spanish: Frente Revolucionario Democrático Cubano
- Abbreviation: FRD
- Successor: Cuban Revolutionary Council
- Formation: May 1960
- Founder: Cuban exiles
- Founded at: Mexico
- Type: Anti-communist diasporic organization
- Legal status: Defunct
- Purpose: Political opposition to communism; support for Cuban exiles
- Headquarters: Mexico (initial), later offices in New Orleans
- Region served: Cuban diaspora, Cuba
- Official language: Spanish
- U.S. Chapter Head: Sergio Arcacha Smith (New Orleans)
- Main organ: Brigade 2506 (military wing)
- Affiliations: Cuban opposition diasporic groups, CIA
- Remarks: Played a key role in the Bay of Pigs Invasion

The Cuban Democratic Revolutionary Front (Spanish: Frente Revolucionario Democrático Cubano, FRD) was an anti-communist Cuban exile coalition organized and funded by the United States Central Intelligence Agency (CIA) in May 1960 to oppose Fidel Castro's government and serve as political cover for the Bay of Pigs Invasion. In total, it was composed of five major groups. The FRD's military wing was called Brigade 2506, which participated in the failed landing attempt on Cuba. Sergio Arcacha Smith was the head of the New Orleans chapter of the FRD. In December 1960, Arcacha Smith opened an office in the Balter Building at 403 Camp Street, Room 207. This was the building where anti-communist activist and accused JFK assassination conspirator Guy Banister had his office until July 1960. In October 1961, the FRD was absorbed by the Cuban Revolutionary Council, and Arcacha moved the office to 544 Camp Street for several months. Arcacha was forced out of his position in January 1962 by a group of local Cuban exiles.
