= Osvaldo Dorticós Torrado =

President of Cuba from 1959 to 1976

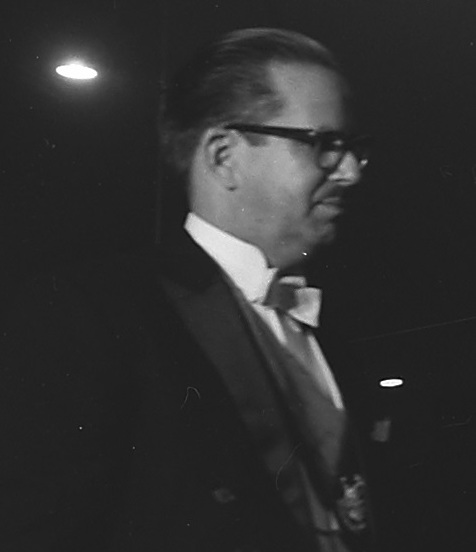
- Dorticós in 1960

14th President of Cuba
- In office 18 July 1959 – 2 December 1976
- Prime Minister: Fidel Castro
- Preceded by: Manuel Urrutia
- Succeeded by: Fidel Castro

Vice President of the Council of State and Ministers
- In office 2 December 1976 – 23 June 1983
- President: Fidel Castro

Minister of Justice
- In office 10 January 1980 – 23 June 1983
- President: Fidel Castro
- Preceded by: Armando Torres Santrayll
- Succeeded by: Héctor Garcín y Guerra

Personal details
- Born: 17 April 1919 Cienfuegos, Republic of Cuba
- Died: 23 June 1983 (aged 64) Havana, Cuba
- Cause of death: Suicide by gunshot
- Party: Popular Socialist Party (1941–1961); 26th of July Movement (1953–1965); Communist Party of Cuba (1965–1983)
- Spouse: María de la Caridad Molina
- Education: University of Havana
- Profession: Lawyer
- Nickname: Cucharita (Teaspoon)

Osvaldo Dorticós Torrado (Note: In this Spanish name, the first or paternal surname is Dorticós and the second or maternal family name is Torrado.) (Spanish: [osˈβaldo ðoɾtiˈkos toˈraðo]; 17 April 1919 – 23 June 1983) was a Cuban politician who served as the president of Cuba from 1959 to 1976. He was a close ally of Cuban revolutionary and longtime leader Fidel Castro.

== Background ==
Dorticós was born to a wealthy family in Cienfuegos, Las Villas Province, on 17 April 1919. His father was both a lawyer and a physician, and one of his ancestors was Tomas Terry, a Venezuelan-born entrepreneur of paternal Irish descent who amassed one of the largest fortunes in the Western Hemisphere ($25 million at the time of his death in 1886), who established the Thomas Terry Theatre in Cienfuegos. After working briefly as a teacher, Dorticós studied law and philosophy at the University of Havana, graduating with a law degree in 1941. He joined the Communist-controlled Popular Socialist Party, and acted for a time as secretary to Juan Marinello, the party's leader.

In the 1950s, Dorticós established a prosperous law practice in Cienfuegos, and served as Commodore of the Cienfuegos Yacht Club. He strongly opposed the government of Fulgencio Batista, and participated in the Civil Resistance Movement, supplying the rebel forces with arms and supplies. Dorticós was elected dean of the Havana Bar Association in 1958 prior to being arrested by the Batista regime in the same year and being briefly exiled to Mexico.

== Roles in government ==
After the success of the Revolution on 1 January 1959, Dorticós returned to Cuba and was appointed Minister of Revolutionary Laws in the cabinet headed by Fidel Castro. In that capacity, he played an important role in drafting revolutionary legislation such as the Agrarian Reform Act and the Fundamental Organic Law that supplanted the Constitution of 1940. After the resignation of President Manuel Urrutia, Dorticós was appointed President of Cuba by the Council of Ministers on 17 July 1959.

As President, Dorticós represented Cuba at the 1st Summit of the Non-Aligned Movement in Belgrade, SFR Yugoslavia (1961), and at the Summit of the Organisation of American States in Punta del Este, Uruguay (1962). During the Cuban Missile Crisis of 1962, Dorticós gave a speech at the United Nations in which he announced that Cuba possessed nuclear weapons, which it hoped would never be used. In 1964 he participated in the 2nd Summit of the Non-Aligned Movement in Cairo. He was present at the inauguration of Peronist President Héctor Cámpora on 25 May 1973, in Buenos Aires, along with Chilean President Salvador Allende.

In addition to being Cuba's President, Dorticós served as a member of the Secretariat of the Central Committee of the Communist Party of Cuba (from 1965); and as president of the Central Planning Council (from 1964).

A new constitution enacted in 1976 merged the posts of president and prime minister. Castro became president, and Dorticós was named President of the National Bank and a member of the Council of State.

== Death ==
Dorticós shot himself on 23 June 1983. His suicide was apparently brought on by the death of his wife, as well as chronic spinal disease.

== Honours and awards ==
=== Foreign honours ===
- Star of the Republic of Indonesia, 1st Class (1960)
- (Mexico) Collar of the Order of the Aztec Eagle (1960)
- (Czechoslovakia) Grand Cross of the Order of the White Lion (1961)
- (North Korea) Order of the National Flag, 1st Class (1966)
- (Chile) Collar of the Order of Merit (1972)
- (Poland) Grand Cross of the Order of Polonia Restituta (1973)
- (Romania) Order of the Star of the Romanian Socialist Republic, 1st Class (1973)

== See also ==
- Communist Party of Cuba
