= Manuel Ray Rivero =

Cuban politician (1924–2013)

- Born: 1924; Cuba
- Died: November 12, 2013 (aged 88–89)
- Occupations: Engineer; Politician
- Known for: Involvement in Cuban politics

Manuel Ray Rivero (1924 – November 12, 2013) was a Cuban born engineer, politician and revolutionary, who was later involved in civic and professional activities in Puerto Rico. He received a scholarship from the Cuban Ministry of Public Works to study civil engineering at the University of Utah. He returned to Cuba in 1949 to work in the field of engineering, and later became project manager for the construction of the Havana Hilton Hotel. In his early career, he was also involved in several other major engineering projects, earning a reputation as one of the leading Cuban structural engineers of his time.

In 1957, he formed the Civic Resistance Movement to defeat the regime of Fulgencio Batista. The Civic Resistance movement undertook multiple sabotage and propaganda actions against the Batista regime, principally in Havana and other major cities of Cuba. Its actions have been considered one of the principal reasons for the eventual collapse of the Batista regime.

After Fidel Castro took power in Cuba, Ray accepted the position of Minister of Public Works (January 1959). During his short tenure as Minister of Public Works, Ray recruited a number of highly qualified young professionals to work in a very ambitious program aimed at modernizing infrastructure.

In November 1959, Ray resigned from his position due to his disagreement with the increasing Communist influence in the Cuban government. By the end of the year, 12 of the 29 ministers originally assigned had resigned or been removed. This led him, in May 1960, to form the Revolutionary Movement of the People (MRP) and join the underground resistance to Castro. Soon the anti-Castro organization had an active membership in each of Cuba's six provinces. The MRP was designed as a progressive organization, and it clearly did not wish to turn back the clock, or re-instate the 1940 Constitution. Instead, it proposed a continuation of laws passed by Castro and the Revolution, including the nationalization of all utilities.

Eventually Ray was forced to leave Cuba or face jail and/or execution. He entered the United States on November 10, 1960, but he was not exactly welcomed by several Cuban-American leaders, such as Manuel Artime, because his group had been to the left of other Miami-based anti-Castro groups.

John F. Kennedy wanted Ray to join the Cuban Revolutionary Council (CRC) and Ray finally agreed to do so three weeks before the Bay of Pigs Invasion. About a month after the failed invasion, on May 28, 1961, Ray gave a news conference in Miami announcing his break with the CRC. His reasons were that priority should have been given to underground fighters in Cuba, members of Batista's regime should not have been involved in the invasion, and he should have had a "say" about the military leaders of the invasion. He added that to overthrow Castro, it would be necessary to mobilize the discontented people in Cuba, to which he had more access than any of the CIA-selected leaders.

In Puerto Rico, Ray began working as a special consultant for the Puerto Rico Planning Board and developed a close relationship with then governor Luis Muñoz Marín. However, he also continued his anti-Castro activities, founding the JURE, (Junta Revolucionaria Cubana), a movement named after the one founded in the 1890s by José Martí in New York City. This movement operated independently of the other anti-Castro groups of the time, and, like many of the other groups, was supported by the CIA.

In 1963–65, the JURE organized several actions against the Castro government. In the last of these actions, Ray along with several members of the JURE, was arrested at Anguila Cay in the Cay Sal Bank by the Bahamian Coast Guard. The group was using the small deserted island as a staging area for attacks against Cuba. The Bahamian government confiscated all weapons and supplies and briefly jailed the group, which eventually was deported back to the United States.

After the arrest, Ray returned to Puerto Rico and to his professional career as an engineer. He ceased his involvement in armed actions against the Castro government, but continued political activities against the Castro regime. However, Mr. Ray became increasingly involved in Puerto Rican civic and political activities, serving as ad-honorem advisor to governors Rafael Hernández Colón and Aníbal Acevedo Vilá, mayor Héctor Luis Acevedo and gubernatorial candidate Victoria Muñoz Mendoza.

In 1967, along with Juan L. Melendez, former head of the Cuban water and sewer agency, he founded an engineering firm in San Juan, Puerto Rico. The firm, Ray Architects and Engineers, has been involved in multiple projects in Puerto Rico and the Caribbean. After retirement following a stroke in 1999, Ray served as the company's chairman emeritus.

Due to his contributions to Puerto Rican society, Ray was awarded the Luis Muñoz Marín medal by the government of Puerto Rico in the early 2000s.

== Sources ==
- Thomas, H. Cuba, The Struggle for Freedom
- Barquin, R. Las luchas guerrilleras en Cuba
- Franqui, Carlos, Diary of the Cuban Revolution
- Franqui, Carlos, Family Portrait with Fidel
- Notes on Manuel Ray Rivero
- Manuel Ray
