= Manuel Urrutia Lleó =

President of Cuba in 1959

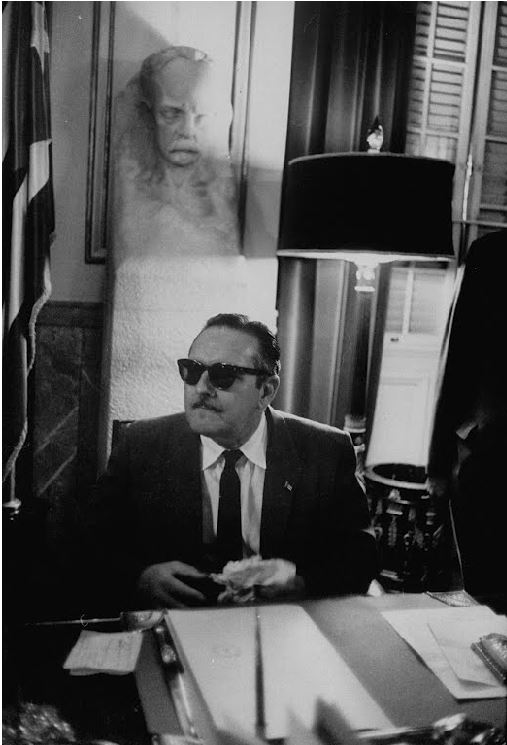
- Manuel Urrutia in 1959

13th President of Cuba
- In office January 2, 1959 – July 18, 1959
- Prime Minister: José Miró Cardona; Fidel Castro
- Preceded by: Carlos Modesto Piedra
- Succeeded by: Osvaldo Dorticós Torrado

Personal details
- Born: December 8, 1901 Yaguajay, Las Villas, U.S.-administered Cuba
- Died: July 5, 1981 (aged 79) Queens, New York, U.S.
- Party: Independent (Liberal)
- Spouse: Esperanza Llaguno Aguirre (1907–1986)

Manuel Urrutia Lleó (Latin American Spanish: [maˈnwel uˈrutja ʝeˈo]; December 8, 1901 – 5 July 1981) was a liberal Cuban lawyer and politician. He campaigned against the Gerardo Machado government and the dictatorial second presidency of Fulgencio Batista during the 1950s, before serving as president in the revolutionary government of 1959. Urrutia resigned his position after only seven months, owing to a series of disputes with revolutionary leader Fidel Castro, and emigrated to the United States shortly afterward.

== Before the presidency ==
Born in Yaguajay, Las Villas, Cuba, Urrutia was a leading figure in the civil resistance movement against Fulgencio Batista's government during the Cuban Revolution. He was the agreed choice for the future president among Fidel Castro's 26th of July Movement as early as April 1958.

In 1957, he had presided in court over a case in which members of the movement had been charged with "anti-government activities". He ruled that the defendants had been acting within their rights.

A year later, he visited the US to gain support for the revolution, successfully lobbying for a halt of weapons shipments to Batista's forces. It was considered that the choice of Urrutia, an educated liberal and Christian, as president would be welcomed by the US.

== Presidency ==
The Cuban Revolution gained victory on January 1, 1959, and Urrutia returned from exile in Venezuela to take up residence in the presidential palace (disputed). His new revolutionary government consisted largely of Cuban political veterans and pro-business liberals including José Miró, who was appointed as prime minister.

Once in power, Urrutia swiftly began a program of closing all brothels, gambling outlets and the national lottery, arguing that these had long been a corrupting influence on the state. The measures drew immediate resistance from the large associated workforce. The disapproving Castro, then commander of Cuba's new armed forces, intervened to request a stay of execution until alternative employment could be found.

Disagreements also arose in the new government concerning pay cuts, which were imposed on all public officials on Castro's demand. The disputed cuts included a reduction of the $100,000 a year presidential salary Urrutia had inherited from Batista. By February, following the surprise resignation of Miró, Castro had assumed the role of prime minister; this strengthened his power and rendered Urrutia increasingly a figurehead president. As Urrutia's participation in the legislative process declined, other unresolved disputes between the two leaders continued to fester. His belief in the restoration of elections was rejected by Castro, who felt that they would usher in a return to the old discredited system of corrupt parties and fraudulent balloting that had marked the Batista era.

Urrutia was then accused by the Avance newspaper of buying a luxury villa, which was portrayed as a frivolous betrayal of the revolution and led to an outcry from the general public. He denied the allegation issuing a writ against the newspaper in response. The story further increased tensions between the various factions in the government, though Urrutia asserted publicly that he had "absolutely no disagreements" with Fidel Castro. Urrutia attempted to distance the Cuban government (including Castro) from the growing influence of the Communists within the administration, making a series of critical public comments against the latter group. Whilst Castro had not openly declared any affiliation with the Cuban communists, Urrutia had been a declared anti-Communist since they had refused to support the insurrection against Batista, stating in an interview, "If the Cuban people had heeded those words, we would still have Batista with us ... and all those other war criminals who are now running away".

=== Cabinet, January 1959 ===
- Prime Minister: José Miró Cardona
- Minister of State: Roberto Agramonte
- Minister of the Treasury: Raúl Chibás
- Minister of Justice: Ángel Fernández Rodríguez
- Minister of Health: Julio Martínez Páez
- Minister of Commerce: Raul Cepero Bonilla
- Minister of Labor: Manuel Fernández García
- Minister of Education: Armando Hart
- Minister of Government: Luis Orlando Rodríguez (Cuban)
- Minister of Public Works: Manuel Ray Rivero
- Minister of Agriculture: Humberto Sorí Marin
- Minister of Recuperation of Misappropriated Goods: Faustino Pérez Hernández
- Minister of National Defense: Augusto R. Martínez Sánchez
- Minister of Communications: Enrique Oltuski Ozacki
- Minister of Social Welfare: Elena Mederos
- Minister of National Economic Council: Regino Boti León
- President of the National Bank of Cuba: Felipe Pazos Roque
- Secretary to the President and Council of Ministers: Luis M. Buch Rodríguez
- Chief of the Navy: Gasper Brooks Avella
- Army Chief of Staff: Colonel Jose M. Rego Rubido
- National Police Chief: Efigenio Ameijeiras
- President of the Supreme Court: Emilio Menéndez Menéndez
- Supreme Court Prosecutor: Felipe Luaces Sebrago
- Ambassador to the United Nations: Adis C. Garcia
- Ambassador to the United States: Ernesto Dihigo
- Delegate General of the President to the Armed Forces and the Maximum Leader of the 26 of July Movement: Fidel Castro

=== Resignation ===
On July 17, 1959, Conrado Bécquer, the sugar workers' leader, demanded Urrutia's resignation. Castro himself resigned as Prime Minister of Cuba in protest, but later that day appeared on television to deliver a lengthy denouncement of Urrutia, claiming that Urrutia "complicated" government, and that his "fevered anti-Communism" was having a detrimental effect. Castro's sentiments received widespread support as organized crowds surrounded the presidential palace demanding Urrutia's resignation, which was duly received. On July 23, Castro resumed his position as premier and appointed Osvaldo Dorticós as the new president.

== After Cuba ==
After leaving his post, Urrutia sought asylum in the embassy of Venezuela before settling in Queens, New York, United States. He worked as a university professor until his death in 1981, in Queens, New York.

== Published works ==
- Fidel Castro & Company, Inc.: Communist Tyranny in Cuba, Frederick A. Praeger, Inc., New York, 1964
