= José Miró Cardona =

Prime Minister of Cuba in 1959

- Miró in 1962

14th Prime Minister of Cuba
- In office 5 January 1959 – 13 February 1959
- President: Manuel Urrutia Lleó
- Preceded by: Gonzalo Güell
- Succeeded by: Fidel Castro

Personal details
- Born: 22 August 1902 Havana, Cuba
- Died: 10 August 1974 (aged 71) San Juan, Puerto Rico
- Party: Independent

José Miró Cardona (22 August 1902 – 10 August 1974) was a Cuban politician. He served as Prime Minister for a period of some six weeks in early 1959, following his appointment by President Manuel Urrutia on 5 January 1959. On 13 February 1959, Miró unexpectedly resigned and was replaced by Fidel Castro.

== Early life ==
Miró was a lawyer and professor at the University of Havana and had become a noted leader in the civil opposition to President Fulgencio Batista. He had inspired students to work for the Cuban Revolution. Following his brief spell as Prime Minister of Cuba, Castro designated Miró ambassador to Spain in May 1960. But by July, Miró had rejected the policies of Castro, resigned his post and had sought refuge in the Argentine Embassy. He entered the United States as an exile in the winter of 1960–61.

== Revolutionary Council and the Bay of Pigs invasion ==
In the U.S. Miró became the head of the exile group Cuban Revolutionary Council which became a principal exile committee working with the Kennedy administration on preparations for the Bay of Pigs invasion of 1961. It was decided that Miró would become the provisional President of Cuba depending upon the success of the invasion, and after the exiles had gained "a piece of Cuban soil". Miró drafted a constitutional programme for Cuba's economic and political future to encourage Cubans to reject Castro. The document was considered too conservative by officials in Washington, yet too "communistic" by the dominant right wing of the Cuban exile community. Despite this, Miró accepted amendments offered by Washington which were designed to appeal to the poorer rural classes in Cuba.

As the deadline for the proposed invasion neared, Miró became increasingly frustrated with the CIA and the lack of communication between different factions. "There must be some military plan I don't know about. I would like to know about it for purposes of coordination. I don't want to know these things; but I have to know to make our efforts effective". Miró was convinced that U.S. forces would support the Cuban exile invasion, even telling other groups that 10,000 U.S. troops were on hand to assist. The CIA, and the Kennedy administration repeatedly denied that the U.S. had offered overt military support.

On the eve of the invasion Miró made his keynote announcement:

To arms, Cubans! We must conquer or we shall die choked by slavery. In the name of God we assure you all that after the victory we will have peace, human solidarity, general well-being and absolute respect for the dignity of all Cubans without exception. (The New York Times, April 9, 1961).

As the invasion floundered, Miró, whose son had joined the invasion force, blamed the CIA for the failure. Miró concluded that the CIA had entirely disregarded resistance groups within Cuba, ignored the paramilitary groups led by Manuel Ray and misled the Cuban exiles over the role of the U.S. military in the invasion. In April 1963, Miró Cardona resigned as chairman of the CRC, claiming that Kennedy had chosen a path of peaceful coexistence with Castro's government. He felt that the U.S. had become a "victim of a master play by the Russians" and angrily stated that "the struggle for Cuba is in the process of being liquidated by the Government".

Later, he was a law professor at the University of Puerto Rico at Río Piedras.

== Family ==
Miró was married to Ernestina Torra and they had two children, Yolanda and Jose Antonio Miró Torra, and seven grandchildren - two born to Yolanda (Yolanda de la Luz and Sergio López Miró) and five born to Jose (Silviana, Jose, Patricia, Natalia and Fernando Miró Santaella). He died in San Juan, Puerto Rico on 10 August 1974, aged 71.
