= 2021–2023 Cuban migration crisis =

Mass exodus of Cuban nationals

The 2021–2023 Cuban migration crisis referred to an event characterized by a significant surge of Cuban nationals leaving the country, mostly to the United States, due to a combination of factors, including economic hardships and political uncertainties in their homeland. The crisis has resulted in a notable increase in Cuban encounters at the Mexico–United States border, with many attempting to cross into the country through both regular border crossings and sea arrivals, particularly in South Florida. The mass exodus has posed humanitarian, social, and political challenges for both Cuba and the U.S., prompting discussions and negotiations between the two nations to address the crisis and manage the flow of migrants. It has been described as the largest mass emigration in Cuba's history. It is estimated that more than 850,000 Cubans sought refuge into the United States between 2021 and 2023, depleting Cuba's population by nearly 8%, and that 50% of the new Cuban arrivals in 2021–2023 (425,000) have settled in Miami-Dade County.

== Background and contributing factors ==
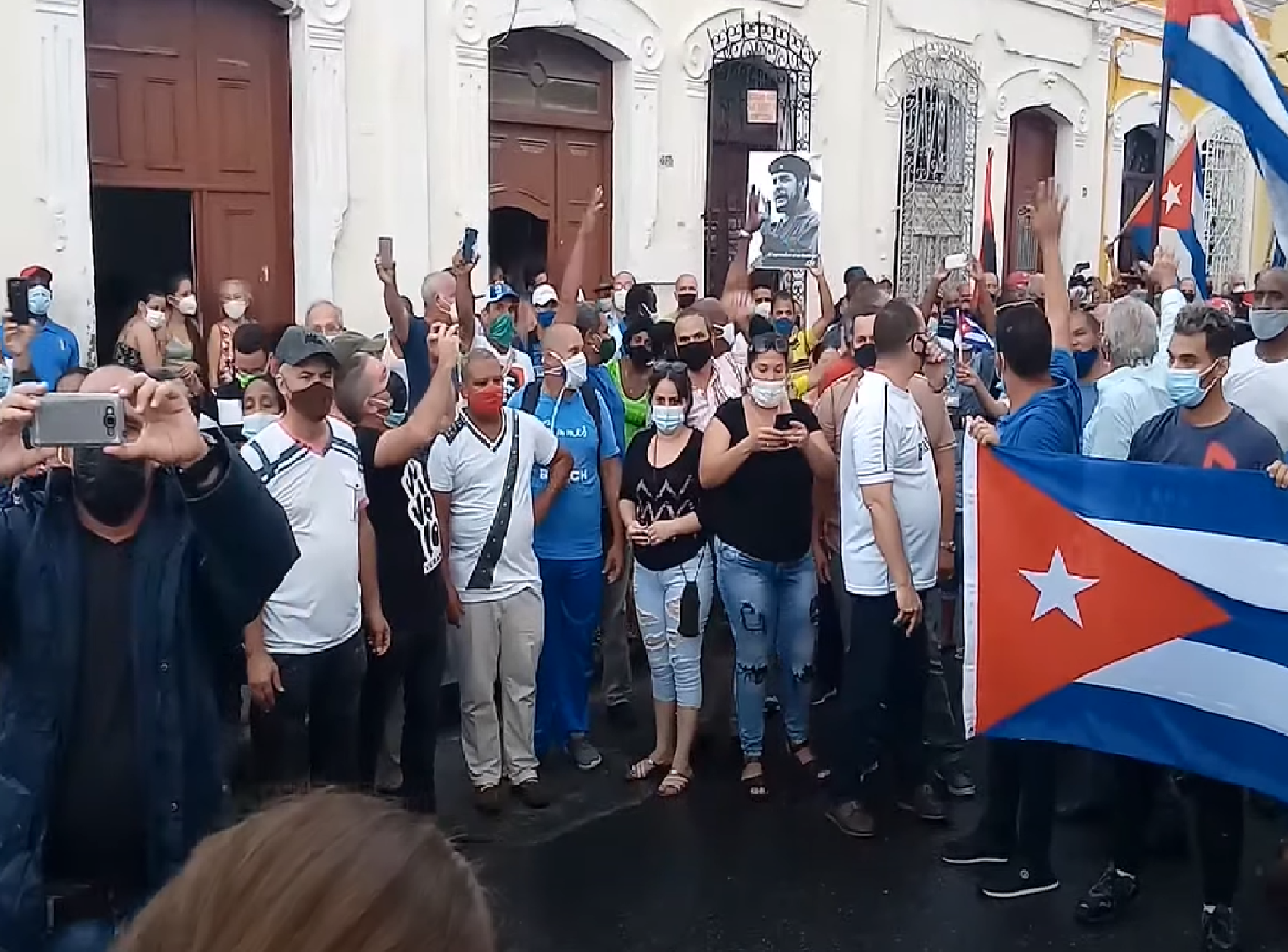
Pro-Cuban government protesters in Cienfuegos, July 2021

The 2021–2023 Cuban migration crisis was sparked by a convergence of factors in the country. Political repression and escalating economic difficulties led to public discontent, culminating in mass protests during the summer of 2021. The demonstrations were a response to rising inflation, chronic shortages of essential goods, and ongoing power outages. The government responded to the protests with a significant crackdown, resulting in the arrest of more than 700 individuals, including teenagers who received lengthy prison sentences. As the political and economic conditions deteriorated, an increasing number of Cubans sought to leave the country, taking loans with high-interest rates to gather the necessary funds, despite the average monthly salary on the island being approximately $46. According to Jorge Duany, head of the Cuban Research Institute at Florida International University, the most immediate reason for the migration surge is the protests in July 2021.

The rise in migration can also be attributed to pent-up demand for legal crossings. In 2017, the Trump administration cut staffing at the U.S. Embassy in Cuba due to mysterious health problems known as "Havana syndrome" affecting American personnel. This move led Cubans to seek visas from the American embassy in Guyana, a costly trip that many couldn't afford. The U.S. was thus unable to fulfill its commitment, outlined in a 1994 agreement between the two countries, to provide 20,000 immigrant visas to Cubans annually, aimed at offering a legal pathway while discouraging illegal migration. However, recent developments showed progress as the U.S. Embassy in Cuba resumed immigrant visa interviews for Cuban applicants for the first time since 2017.

=== Visa change of Nicaragua ===
Another major contributing factor to the crisis was a new visa-free travel policy in Nicaragua, which opened a land route for migrants who were hesitant to undertake the dangerous sea journey to the United States. Nicaragua's government dropped its visa requirement for Cuban citizens in November 2021, leading to a surge in flights between Havana and Managua. Some experts speculated that Nicaragua might be using Cuban migrants to exert pressure on the United States to lift sanctions on Nicaraguan President Daniel Ortega and his inner circle, mirroring similar strategies seen in other geopolitical situations.

== Exodus ==
Most Cuban migrants travel to the United States through Central American nations after Nicaragua removed its entry visa requirements for Cuban citizens in November of the previous year. The journey, costing each traveler between $8,000 and $10,000, has resulted in several fatalities.

During the 2021-2022 fiscal year, approximately 220,000 Cubans were apprehended at the U.S.-Mexican border, a figure nearly six times higher than the previous year.

Cuban migrants apprehended at southern United States border
Calendar year	2021	2022
Fiscal year (October to September)	39,303	224,607
Calendar year	54,818	313,499
Source		

In 2022, monthly arrivals of Cuban migrants reached record numbers. In September, 26,742 Cubans entered North American territory, making it the third-largest monthly total for the year. October saw over 29,000 (29,878) Cuban migrants arriving, accounting for nearly 11% of all migrant entries for that month. December 2022 saw the peak of the exodus, with a record 44,064 Cuban migrants arriving in the United States, nearly equaling the total Cuban entries in 2012 and significantly surpassing the number of Cuban migrants who arrived in the country during the 1994 Cuban rafter crisis. In total, during the calendar year 2022, 313,488 Cubans arrived in the United States, representing almost 3% of Cuba's 2021 population. Thousands of Cuban migrants also requested refuge in Mexico.

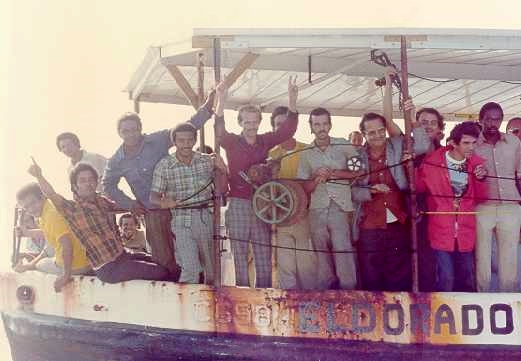
The number of 2022 migrants was more than double the number of Cubans who left the country during the 1980 Mariel boatlift

An estimated 369,393 Cuban emigrants reached various destinations between January and December 2022. This figure surpasses the migration totals of significant historical events, including the Golden exile (354,963), and the Freedom Flights (333,457). The exodus also surpasses aggregate net departures from Cuba, regardless of destination, during 1980 Mariel boatlift and the 1994 Cuban rafter crisis.

Between October 2021 and December 2022, 9,164 Cuban migrants arrived by sea.

Mexico does not permit U.S. authorities to expel Cubans across the land border under Title 42, and Cuba has not authorized U.S. expulsion flights either. In 2022, approximately 98 percent of Cubans apprehended at the border were processed in the United States under regular immigration law. As per the Cuban Adjustment Act, most of them will be eligible to apply for permanent resident status after one year in the United States. In November 2022, Cuba agreed to begin accepting U.S. deportation flights.

Most Cubans entering the U.S. claim they are unable find adequate employment in Cuba, leading to being flagged as "expedited for removal" for illegal entry. However, due to the lack of formal diplomatic relations between the U.S. and Cuba, repatriation is challenging, and migrants are released with periodic verification requirements. They are permitted to obtain work permits, driver's licenses, and Social Security numbers but are not eligible to apply for permanent residency or citizenship. A minority claim they are fleeing political persecution and are "paroled" under the Cuban Adjustment Act, with a chance to obtain permanent residency and citizenship after approval.

=== Demographics ===
The exodus has led to an 3.5% reduction in Cuba's population.

Cuban economists and sociologists argue that the migratory flow is jeopardizing Cuba's future as the majority of those leaving the island are young individuals, including university students and working professionals. According to Juan Carlos Albizu-Campos Espiñeira and Sergio Díaz-Briquets, approximately 80% of the migrants in 2022 were within the prime working ages of 15 to 59.

Cubans comprised more than 8% of the total immigration in the United States in fiscal year 2022. As of March 2023, Cuba was the fifth-largest source country of migrants to the United States.

== Responses ==
The United States has blamed Cuba's inability to provide basic services like electricity for the exodus, while the Cuban government attributes the mass departures to the United States embargo against Cuba and its policy of granting benefits to Cuban migrants, even those arriving illegally.

Jorge Duany, director of the Cuban Research Institute at Florida International University, has expressed doubts about the possibility of slowing down the flow of undocumented Cubans to the U.S. through policy changes, and has stated "The hope is that the parole mechanism will in time at least reduce it by channeling it to legal means, but remains to be seen."

=== Bilaterial discussion ===
In contrast to the 1980 Mariel boatlift, when the United States accepted a large influx of Cuban migrants, the U.S. has sought to address the crisis through discreet negotiations with Cuba, indicating a change in its stance.

In late April 2022, the first high-level talks between Cuba and the United States since 2018 focused primarily on reestablishing regular migration channels. The Cuban government requested the US honor the agreement to issue 20,000 immigrant visas annually, while the American government asked Havana to accept Cuban deportees who arrived illegally. The talks aimed to reestablish a formula that had previously worked, providing a feasible legal channel for Cubans to come to the US in exchange for deporting those who arrived illegally. Migration has been a rare point of cooperation between the countries that has shown effectiveness, according to Andrew Selee of the Migration Policy Institute.

== See also ==
- Cuban exodus
- Cuban immigration to the United States
- Cuba-United States relations
- Wet feet, dry feet policy
- Operation Peter Pan
