= Cuban post-revolution exodus =

Defectors from Cuba after the Cuban Revolution

- Part of consolidation of the Cuban Revolution
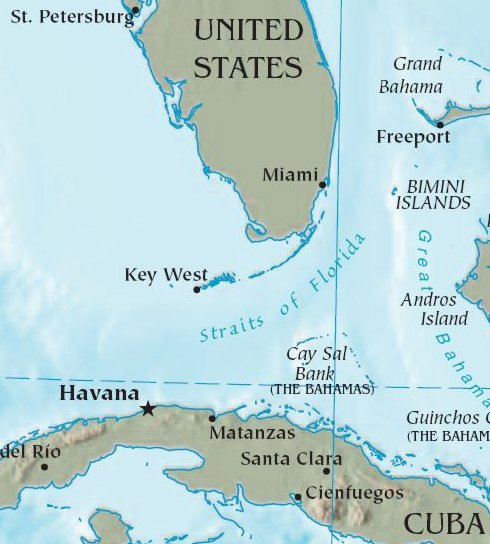
- Cuba is 93 miles (150 kilometres) south of Florida in the United States, the destination many exiles head towards.
- Date: 1959 – present
- Location: Cuba
- Cause: Opposition to Fidel Castro, Raúl Castro and Miguel Díaz-Canel; Land reform in Cuba; Special Period; Political repression
- Outcome: Waves of emigration: Golden exile; Operation Peter Pan; Freedom Flights; Mariel boatlift; 1994 Cuban rafter crisis; 2021–2023 Cuban migration crisis
- Emigrants: 2.9 million

The Cuban post-revolution exodus is the decades long continuous emigration of Cubans from the island of Cuba that has occurred since the conclusion of the Cuban Revolution in 1959. Throughout the exodus, it is estimated that more than 1 million Cubans emigrated within various emigration waves, due to political repression and disillusionment with life in Cuba.

The first wave of emigration occurred directly after the revolution, followed by the Freedom Flights from 1965 to 1973. This was followed by the 1980 Mariel boatlift and after 1994 the flight of balseros emigrating by raft. During the Cuban exile many refugees were granted special legal status by the US government, but these privileges began to be slowly removed in the 2010s by then-president Barack Obama.

The emigrants in the exodus known as "Cuban exiles" have come from various backgrounds in Cuban society, often reflected in the wave of emigration they participated in. Exiles have constructed Cuban communities that continue to preserve Cuban culture abroad, as well as garnering political influence outside Cuba. As of 2022, the majority of the 1,312,510 Cuban exiles living in the United States live in Florida (984,658), mainly in Miami-Dade County (643,954), where more than a third of the population is Cuban or of Cuban descent. Other exiles have relocated to form substantial Cuban communities in Texas (72,993), New Jersey (44,294), Nevada (30,808), California (25,172), New York (state) (18,197), and Kentucky (14,652).

== History ==
=== Golden exile and Bay of Pigs Invasion ===
Before the post-revolution exile around 50,000 Cuban Americans already resided in the United States. Immediately after the 1959 Cuban Revolution around 200,000 Cubans came to South Florida. Of these immigrants the initial wave were mostly collaborators in the recently toppled Batista regime, of the middle or upper class, and of European descent; subsequent waves were formed from Cubans of many different political opinions and backgrounds who opposed the increasingly authoritarian nature of Fidel Castro's rule. Many immigrants believed their exile was temporary since Castro would soon be toppled. Travel between the United States and Cuba was not heavily restricted even in the wake of the recent revolution. In 1960 Dwight D. Eisenhower established the Cuban Refugee Emergency Center which offered public services to Cuban emigrants. Many immigration restrictions were specifically waived for Cubans entering the United States.

A few of these original Cuban exiles were involved in the 1961 Bay of Pigs Invasion which failed to topple Castro. After the Cuban Missile Crisis of 1962 the Cuban government would restrict air traffic to the island, ending the first major wave of emigration.

=== Operation Peter Pan ===
To destabilize the communist government, the CIA and Cuban dissidents began warning of a project by the Castroist government to remove the parents' custody of their children to indoctrinate them. Between November 1960 and October 1962, over 14,000 children were sent to the U.S. by their parents in Operation Peter Pan. These children were taken under the care of the Catholic Church and placed in foster homes throughout the U.S. until they could be reunited with their parents. Their parents sent them into the U.S. in order to keep them from communist indoctrination, with many boys being sent to avoid getting drafted into the Cuban armed forces, and girls being put into the greatly politized Alphabetization Campaign.

=== Camarioca boatlift ===
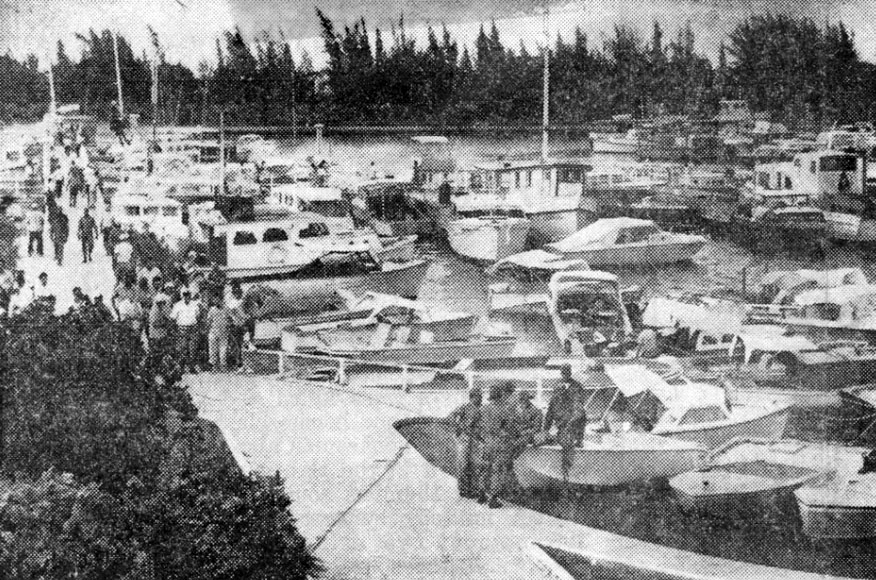
Refugees entering boats at the port of Camarioca

On 28 September 1965, Fidel Castro announced that Cubans wishing to emigrate could do so beginning 10 October from the Cuban port of Camarioca. The administration of U.S. President Johnson tried to control the numbers it would admit to the U.S. and set some parameters for their qualifications, preferring those claiming political persecution and those with family members in the U.S. In negotiations with the Cuban government it set a target of 3,000 to 4,000 people to be transported by air. Despite those diplomatic discussions, Cuban Americans brought small leisure boats from the United States to Camarioca. In the resulting Camarioca boatlift, about 160 boats transported about 5,000 refugees to Key West for immigration processing by U.S. officials. The Johnson administration made only modest efforts to enforce restrictions on this boat traffic. Castro closed the port with little notice on 15 November, stranding thousands. On 6 November, the Cuban and U.S. governments agreed on the details on an emigration airlift based on family reunification and without reference to those the U.S. characterized as political prisoners and whom the Cubans termed counter-revolutionaries. To deal with the crowds at Camarioca, the U.S. added a maritime component to the airborne evacuation. Both forms of transport started operating on 1 December.

=== Freedom Flights ===
From December 1965 to early 1973, under the Johnson and Nixon administrations, twice daily "Freedom Flights" (Vuelos de la Libertad) transported émigrés from Varadero Beach to Miami. The longest airlift of political refugees, it transported 265,297 Cubans to the United States with the help of religious and volunteer agencies. Flights were limited to immediate relatives and Cubans already in the United States with a waiting period anywhere from one to two years.

Many who came through Camarioca and the Freedom Flights were much more racially diverse, of lower economic standing, and of more women compared to earlier emigration waves. This is mainly due to Castro's restriction not allowing skilled laborers to leave the country.

=== Rapprochement with Cuba ===
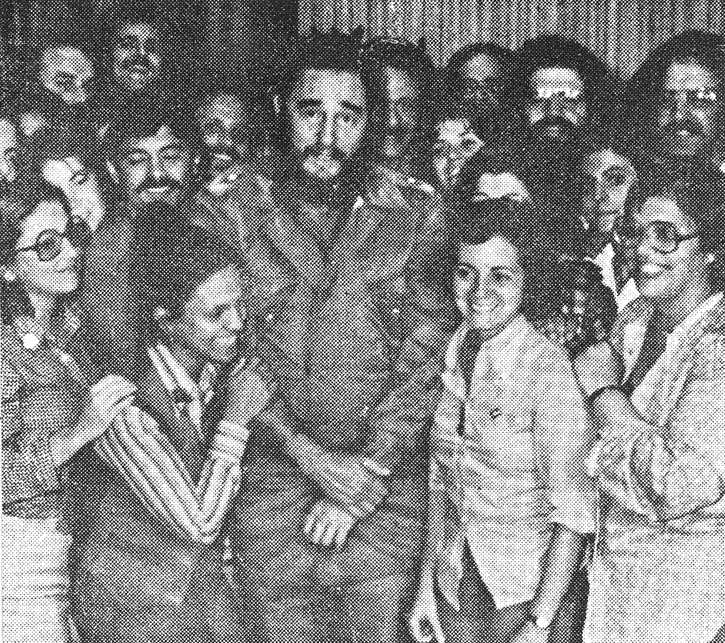
Members of the Antonio Maceo Brigade posing with Fidel Castro

During the Carter administration various actions were taken to better relations between the United States and Cuba. In 1978 the first commercial flight in sixteen years would fly from Miami to Havana. The Cuban government would also allow the visit of the Antonio Maceo Brigade, the first visit of Cuban exiles to the island. Many Cuban exile organizations would protest the warming of relations with Cuba while some other organizations supported increased diplomacy.

Discreet discussions between the United States and Cuba resulted in an agreement to release thousands of political prisoners in August 1978. At the time of the release Jimmy Carter did not want to publicly acknowledge his role in the negotiations. The Cuban government decided to open negotiations with Cuban exiles to better public relations. Originally many Cuban exiles debated the dialogue's usefulness; some were satisfied with the invitation while others doubted the sincerity of the negotiations believing it to be a publicity stunt. The Cuban government would eventually state that no prisoners would be released until negotiations took place. Eventually the Comite de los 75 (Committee of 75) would be formed of prominent Cuban exiles and led by Bernardo Benes, they would be the official negotiators with the Cuban government.

=== Mariel boatlift ===
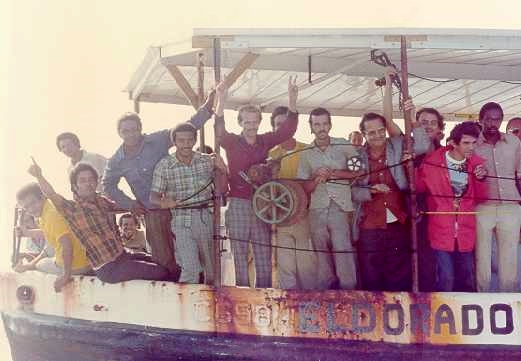
Cuban refugees arriving in crowded boats during the Mariel boatlift crisis

Between 26 April and 1 October 1980, during the Carter administration, probably one of the most significant waves of exiles occurred during what became known as the Mariel Boatlift. The mass boatlift occurred after a number of Cubans drove a bus through the gates of the Havana Peruvian Embassy and requested asylum. One embassy guard died as a result of friendly fire when another guard machine gunned the incoming bus and hit the first one accidentally. When the Peruvian ambassador refused to return the exiled citizens to the authorities, Castro removed the Cuban guards from the embassy, basically opening the door to the 4,000 plus asylum seekers that came into the embassy within the next few days. Reacting to this sudden exodus, Castro stated, "Anyone who wants to leave Cuba can do so" and declared that those who were leaving the country were "escoria" (scum).

This resulted in an even larger exodus through the port of Mariel, where an improvised flotilla of Cuban exiles from Miami in small pleasure boats and commercial shrimping vessels brought Cuban citizens who wished to leave the island. Within weeks, 125,000 Cubans reached the United States despite Coast Guard attempts to prevent boats from leaving U.S. waters for Cuba. As the exodus became international news and an embarrassment for the Cuban government, Castro emptied his hospitals and had prison inmates rounded up as "social undesirables", and included them among the other refugees. The Cuban Communist Party staged meetings at the homes of those known to be leaving the country. People were intimidated by these "repudiation meetings" (mitines de repudio), where the participants screamed obscenities and defiled the facades of the homes, throwing eggs and garbage, for hours. Labeled as "traitors to the revolution", those who declared their wish to leave became the targeted victims of the attacks, their rationing cards were taken from them, their jobs were terminated, or they were expelled from schools or universities. Towards the end of the crisis, the repudiation meetings were ended. The scale of the exodus created political difficulties for the Cuban government, and an agreement was reached to end the boatlift after several months. Out of more than 125,000 refugees, a number from as low as 7,500 to as high as 40,000 were believed to have criminal records in Cuba, though many of their crimes would not qualify as crimes under U.S. law. Some 1,774 of the refugees were classified as serious or violent criminals under U.S. law and denied citizenship on that basis. The majority of refugees were young adult males, 20 to 34 years of age, from the working class: skilled craftsmen, semi-skilled tradesmen, and unskilled laborers.

In response the aftermath of the Mariel Boatlift, the City of Miami formed the East Little Havana Task Force in 1983. Task Force members were appointed by the Miami City Commission and it was chaired by urban planner and Cuban community leader Jesús Permuy. It was tasked with studying the social and economic effects of the boatlift, particularly in Little Havana, which was an epicenter of the migration. The Task Force adjourned a year later and submitted its findings and official recommendations, called The East Little Havana Redevelopment Plan, to the Miami City Commission and Mayor's Office in 1984. Also in 1984, the United States and Cuba negotiated an agreement to resume normal immigration and to return to Cuba those persons who had arrived during the boatlift who were "excludable" under U.S. law.

Many members of the Mariel boatlift were met with suspicion by the Cuban American community already living in the United States. One reason for this was the LGBTQ associations with the exile movement were met with hostility by the portion of the American public that was anti-LGBTQ, and they worried that it would worsen their position in the United States. Along similar reasoning, there was concern about the alleged criminal nature of the so-called Marielitos, because of Cuba's dispersion of social undesirables into the exile population.

=== Balseros ===
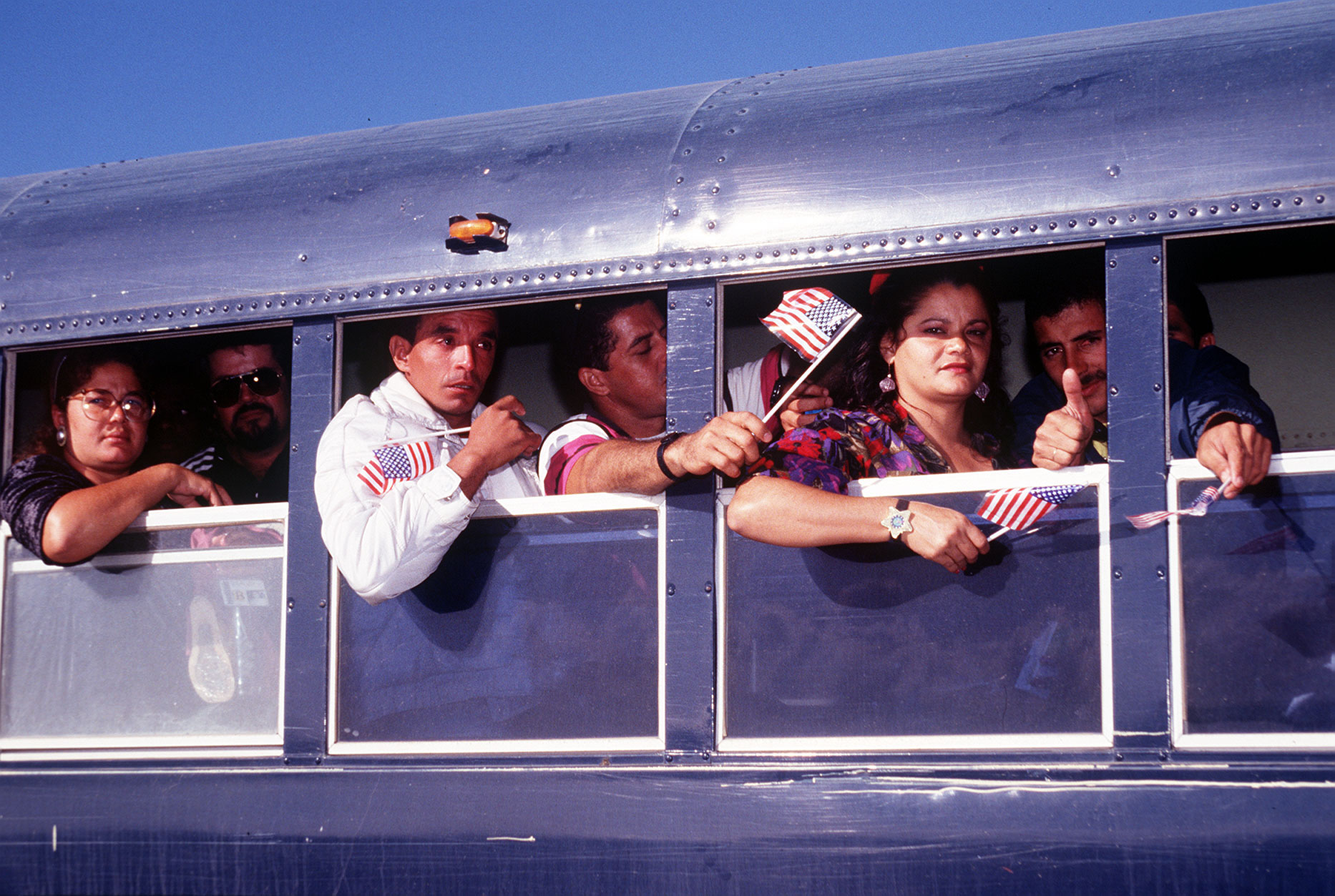
Cuban refugees leaving Guantanamo Bay naval base in the aftermath of the Cuban rafter crisis

During the past years, exile waves have consisted of balseros, who travel in homemade rafts. On 18 August 1994, U.S. Attorney General Janet Reno said in a press release:

To divert the Cuban people from seeking democratic change, the government of Cuba has resorted to an unconscionable tactic of letting people risk their lives by leaving in flimsy vessels through the treacherous waters of the Florida Straits. Many people have lost their lives in such crossings. We urge the people of Cuba to remain home and not to fall for this callous maneuver. I want to work with all concerned including the Cuban American community to make sure the message goes out to Cubans that putting a boat or raft to sea means putting life and limb at risk... To prevent this from happening again, the Coast Guard has mounted an aggressive public information campaign so people know that vessels... may be stopped and boarded and may be seized. Individuals who violate U.S. law will be prosecuted in appropriate circumstances.

President Clinton, trying to stem the flow of Cuban rafters, pressed a dozen Latin American governments to provide internment camps that officials hoped would prove more attractive to refugees than the U.S. Navy base at Guantanamo Bay in Cuba. Although the refugees at Guantanamo were held behind barbed wire, to many, the base was less forbidding than a foreign internment camp.

As a result of bilateral migration accords between the two governments, in September 1994 and May 1995, the status quo of U.S. policy toward Cuban migrants was altered significantly. The U.S. granted Cuba an annual minimum of 20,000 legal immigrant visas and, at the same time, determined that Cubans picked up at sea would be sent home just as any other group of illegal immigrants. President Clinton's agreement with Cuba resolved the dilemma of the approximately 33,000 Cubans then at Guantanamo. This new agreement had two new points. The United States agreed to take most of the Cubans detained at Guantanamo through the humanitarian parole provision. Cuba agreed to credit some of these admissions toward the minimum quota of 20,000 migrants from Cuba, with 5,000 charged annually over the years. Secondly, rather than placing Cubans intercepted at sea in a camp, the United States began sending them back to Cuba. Both governments promised to follow international agreements to ensure that no action would be taken against the people returned to Cuba.

As a result of these migration agreements and interdiction policy, a "wet foot/dry foot" practice toward Cuban immigrants was developed. Those who did not reach dry land were returned to Cuba unless they feared persecution there, but only those who meet the definition of asylum refugee were accepted for eventual resettlement in a third country. Those Cuban rafters who did reach land were inspected by Department of Homeland Security and usually were allowed to stay in the United States. From May 1995 through July 2003, about 170 Cuban refugees were resettled in eleven different countries, including Spain, Venezuela, Australia, and Nicaragua. Since March 2003 the State Department has not been allowed to monitor the treatment of the immigrants returned to Cuba.

The wet foot/dry foot was abruptly ended by President Obama days before he ended his second term in 2017, which sparked controversy for the Cuban exile community.

=== Cuban Thaw and aftermath ===
President Barack Obama announced he would restore diplomatic relations with Cuba in 2014. After negotiations with the Cuban government, the Obama administration agreed to end the Wet feet, dry feet policy and Cuba agreed to give reparations to Cuban nationals. Later, President Donald Trump would prioritize deporting any immigrant who entered the U.S. illegally, including Cubans. It became much more difficult for Cubans to legally apply for visas to the U.S. after the U.S. embassy in Havana was closed after alleged sonic attacks against the facility.

From 2021 to 2026, over one million Cubans had emigrated. Amidst an oil shortage and economic crisis, the government announced it would allow Cuban nationals not currently residing in the country to invest in and operate businesses in Cuba.

== People ==
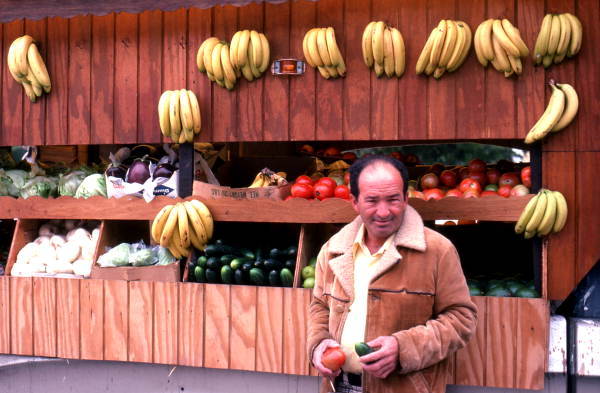
Fruit and vegetable stand in Little Havana, Miami (1980)

=== Economics ===
Cuban exiles would come from various economic backgrounds, usually reflecting the emigration wave they were a part of. Many of the Cubans who would emigrate early were from the middle and upper class, but often brought very little with them when leaving Cuba. Small Cuban communities were formed in Miami and across the United States and populated with small Cuban-owned businesses. By the Freedom Flights many emigrants were middle class or blue-collar workers, due to the Cuban government's restrictions on the emigration of skilled workers. Many exiled professionals were unlicensed outside Cuba and began offering their services in the informal economy. Cuban exiles also used Spanish language skills to open import-export businesses tied to Latin America. By the 1980s many Cuban exile-owned businesses would prosper and a thriving business community would develop. By the 1980 Mariel boatlift most new emigrants from Cuba were economic migrants typically leaving to escape the harsh prospects of the Cuban economy.

=== Gender and sexuality ===
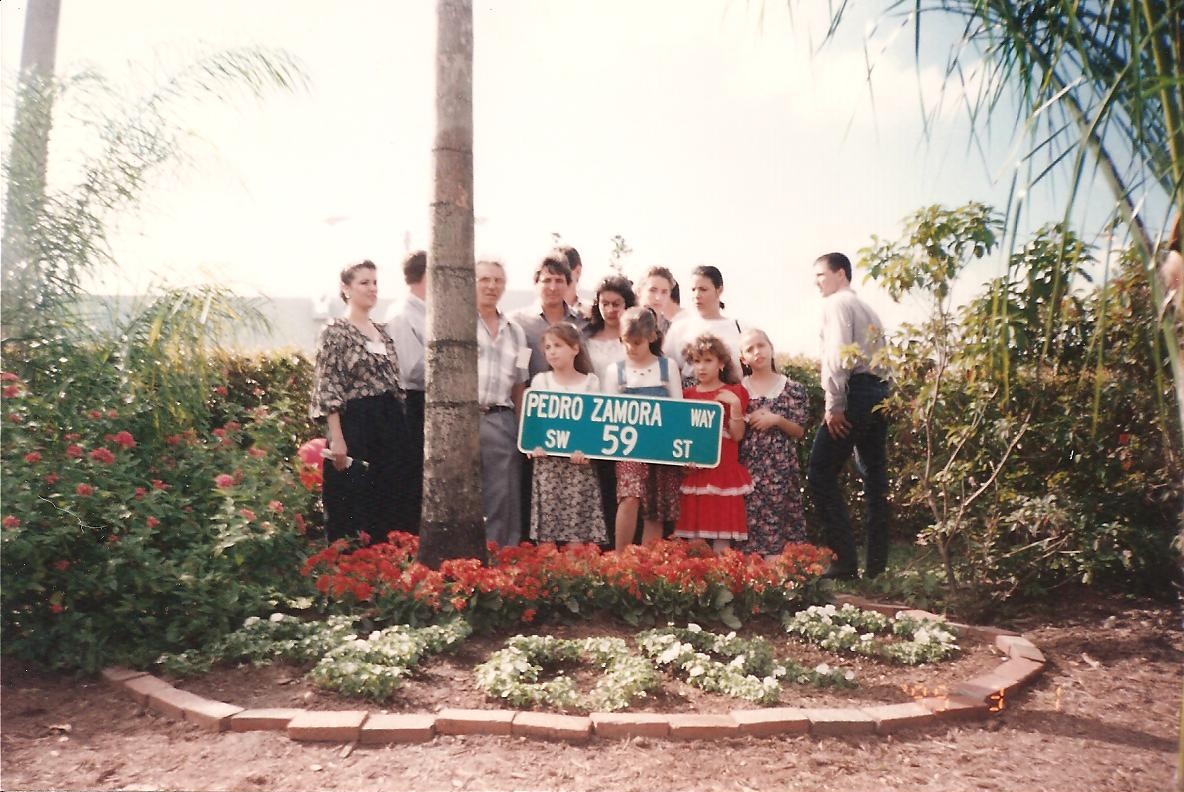
1995 memorial for openly-gay Cuban exile and AIDS educator Pedro Zamora

Between 1965 and 1968 the Cuban government interned LGBT people in labor camps called the Military Units to Aid Production. Outside the camps, discrimination against LGBT people was rampant in Cuban society, homosexuality would not be decriminalized until 1979. Queer Cubans notably tried to escape the island either by enlisting in the Cuban military to be deployed abroad, or by emigrating in the Mariel boatlift where LGBT Cuban prisoners were specifically targeted by authorities to be given approval to emigrate.

The male exiles of the Mariel boatlift were depicted by the Castro administration as effeminate and often implied they were gay. Revolutionary masculinity and an association of homosexuality with capitalism had fostered homophobic sentiments in Revolutionary Cuban culture. This atmosphere had driven many LGBTQ-identifying Cubans to flee when Castro announced he would allow the exodus. By 1980, homosexuality was no longer criminalized by Cuban law, but gays and lesbians still faced systemic discrimination. There was a social phenomenon of men pretending to be gay to pass the interviews required of applicants for the exodus, because it was believed that homosexuals were more likely to pass the panel held to determine if a person could exit from Cuba. Communities of gay exiles formed in the processing centers that formed for those applying for entry to the United States. These centers kept their gender populations segregated. As a result, a majority of reports of queer Cuban exile communities in these centers were focused on gay male exiles. However, secondhand reports suggested parallel lesbian communities had formed in the women's population. Though United States law technically barred emigration into the country on grounds of homosexuality, exceptions were made for the exiles to support them as anti-communists. Only LGBTQ people who clearly and explicitly told the US immigration panel that they identified as such were denied entry to the United States.

Author Susana Pena has written about LGBT people in the Mariel boatlift and has speculated that their resettlement in Miami may have spurred on a revival of LGBT social life in Miami's South Beach.

=== Afro-Cuban exiles ===
Though the early waves of Cuban exiles were majority white, Afro-Cuban exiles became more common among the Mariel Boatlift and Balseros periods. Anywhere between 20% and 40% of Marielitos were identified as black. Afro-Cuban exiles from Cuba experienced a transition from the more racially integrated Cuban society, and found themselves split between a majority white Cuban exile community and a distrustful African American community. A substantial portion of Afro-Cuban exiles blended more into the African American community, but some are still tied to the Cuban community.

== Activism ==
=== General history ===
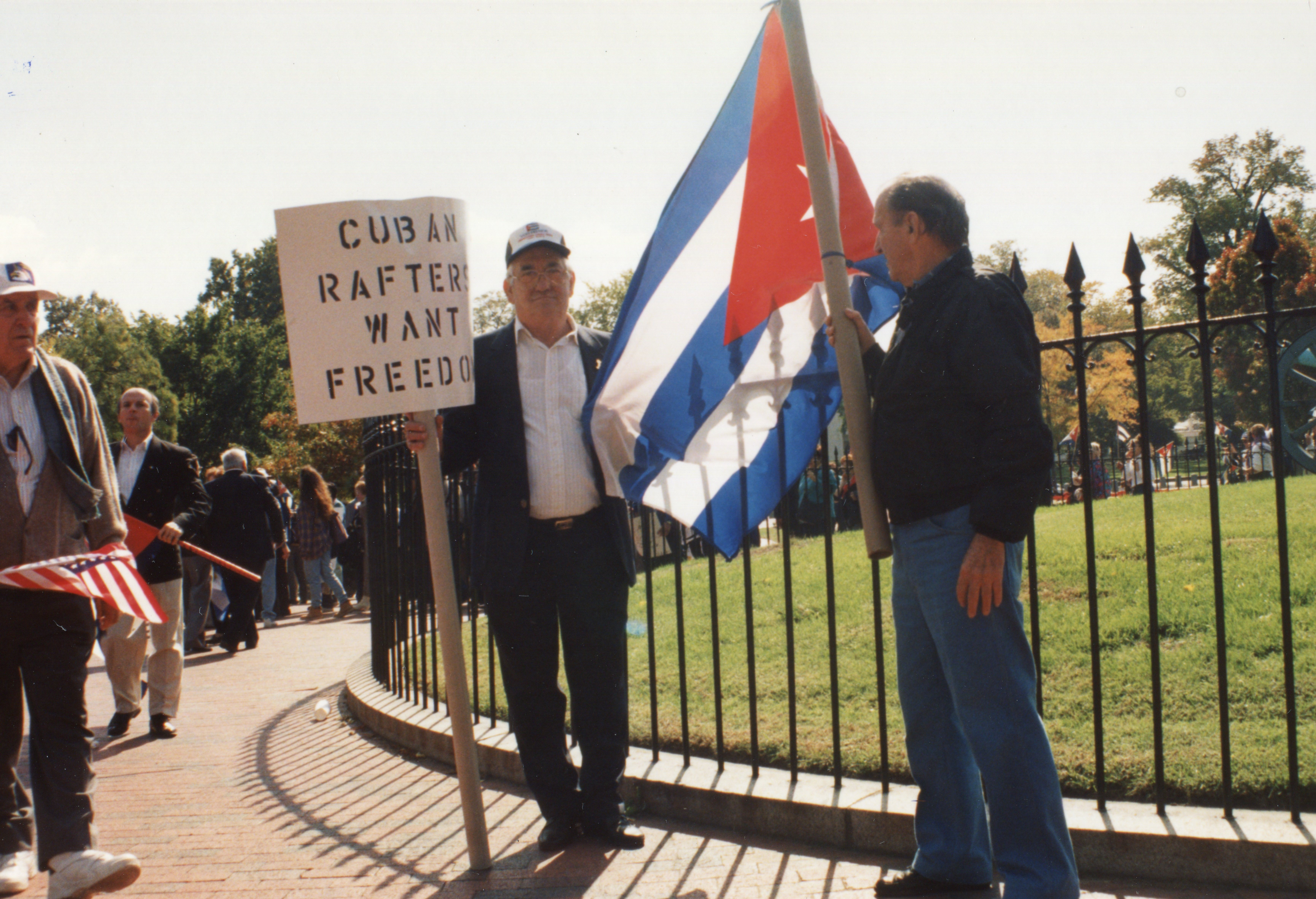
Cuban exiles protest regarding the 1994 Cuban rafter crisis.

In the first years of the Cuban exile not many exiles participated in anti-Castro militancy, but many funded or supported these actions. Many exiles believed their stay abroad was temporary and that most political focus should be on the overthrow of Fidel Castro in actions such as the Bay of Pigs Invasion. As exiles continued to live abroad many began to shift their political focus to issues of assimilation. Cuban exiles would grow more politically diverse, often reflecting their social class, generation, or even participation in counter-cultural movements of the 1960s. As issues of assimilation became apparent more exiles abandoned the idea that their exile would be temporary and began to seek new citizenship papers, and start voting. The terrorist activities of militant anti-Castro groups also became highly controversial in Cuban exile communities. Debate within the exile community became incredibly apparent after the visit of the Antonio Maceo Brigade to Cuba and following diplomatic dialogues, many exiles became split with some supporting dialogue and travel with Cuba and others who opposed.

By the 1980s, Cuban exiles have formed thriving communities and began to organize powerful political organizations such as the Cuban American National Foundation. With the Special Period in Cuba political focus began on predictions of the collapse of the Cuban government and aiding internal opposition on the island. During the emigration of balseros, the exile organization Brothers to the Rescue ran humanitarian missions to save rafters as well as drop propaganda leaflets over Cuba.

Cuban exiles in the United States have consistently been generally more politically active and voted more conservatively than other Latino ethnic groups. In 2012, a pew research poll found over 70% of Latino voters supported Barack Obama while only 49% of Cuban-American voters supported Barack Obama. This atypical lean towards Republican candidates can be explained by the Republican Party's accusations of the communist leanings of Democratic politicians as well as Democratic politician's less hard-line stances on relations with Cuba. Despite a history of atypical conservative voting, Cuban-Americans have slowly been increasingly voting in line with the Democratic Party, partly reflecting younger generations' disinterest in relations with Cuba and the demographic differences in exiles that have arrived since the Mariel boatlift.

=== Specific organizations ===
==== Agrupación Abdala ====
In 1968, a Cuban exile activist group called Agrupación Abdala was formed by Gustavo Marin Duarte and other children of the first wave of Cuban exiles. These Cuban Americans were associated with the United States' New Left and they held beliefs that were against the communism of Cuba but also opposed to what they perceived as imperialism by the US. They produced literature that was critical of both the United States and Cuban Communism, and performed a series of activist actions to draw attention to their cause. On the 13th of March, 1971, a group of sixteen Agrupacion Abdala activists staged a protest in the United Nations Headquarters. They staged a sit-in and demanded to speak to a high-ranking official regarding prioritizing the release of political prisoners in Cuba. They were politically militant and believed to opposed Communism violence was necessary. The group struggled to keep a coherent ideology and dissolved in 1980.

==== Truth About Cuba Committee ====
A committee of exile activists called the Truth About Cuba Committee (TACC) formed in 1961 in the United States to present an exile-led perspective of the realities of Communist Cuba. They were an example of the beginning of Cuban exile activism that focused on the portrayal of Cuban exiles as white, middle class, and anti-communist immigrants. In 1965 their president Luis V. Manrara appeared on WTHS-TV in South Florida to publicly decry a film by the National Educational Television network (NET). NET's film, Three Faces of Cuba was decried as a pro-communist and anti-American work of art that willfully misled the public to the realities of the Cuban experience. They published a 104-page analysis of the film called An Exposé of the Insidious Film "Three Faces of Cuba". The implication of the phrasing of "expose" was that the film was not just a bad work of art but was in fact seditious to the United States. The group continued to operate against what they perceived as pro-Communist Cuban misinformation until they disbanded in 1975.

== Characteristics ==
=== Cuba - United States relations ===
According to authors John Scanlan and Gilburt Loescher, United States acceptance of Cuban emigrants after the 1959 Cuban Revolution was done in hopes they could help the United States forcibly remove the Fidel Castro government from Cuba. The acceptance of Cuban emigrants during the Freedom Flights was done in hopes of weakening the Cuban economy by draining it of workers. The United States also was generally able to paint a negative picture of Cuba by participating in the mass emigration of many who disliked Cuba and wished to flee the island. The Department of State painted Cuban emigrants in the 1960s as freedom-seeking refugees. By the Mariel boatlift the United States had lost its total aggressive foreign policy towards Cuba and instead viewed the island as a nuisance rather than a security threat. The Mariel boatlift was soon canceled after it was initiated and received little public American support. Fidel Castro benefited from the exile because he was able to remove disloyalty by directly removing disloyal citizens from Cuba. The emigration of Mariel exiles set the precedent of the first homosexual immigrants being allowed into the United States, on the grounds that they were ultimately anti-communist refugees.

Social analyst Kelly M. Greenhill argues that the 1994 Cuban rafter crisis was in part engineered by the Cuban government to push social problems out of Cuba and threaten the creation of a humanitarian crisis for the United States. This threat would stimulate fears of Cuban immigrants in the United States as was seen previously during the Mariel boatlift and would be able to change United States policy towards Cuba in Cuba's favor.

=== Desire for return ===
In the first emigration wave of Cubans that came after 1959, many emigrants considered their exile to be temporary, because the Castro government was bound to fall soon. Once the Castro government eventually fell, these exiles would return to Cuba, and resume their lives as they were before the Cuban Revolution.

Throughout the 1960s, to compliment a sense of temporary exile, many Cuban emigrants attempted to preserve their Cuban identity by opening Cuban educational institutions for their children while living in exile. With the cancellation of the Freedom Flights in the 1970s, and the entrance of Cuban emigrants from the 1980 Mariel boatlift, a shift developed in the self-perception of Cuban exiles. There was a growing sense that the Castro government was surviving for the long-term, and that their residence outside Cuba would also be long-term. With this shift, came a greater involvement in American politics, and the solidification of the Cuban business district in Little Havana.

For the many Cubans who continue to desire a return to Cuba after the fall of the Castrist government, there is a sense of responsibility that diasporic Cubans should return to assist in the rebuilding of Cuba, to return it to its economic state before the Cuban Revolution.

=== Myths and pseudohistory ===
Throughout the Cuban exodus various myths and legends arose around the history of the exodus and the nature of Cuban exiles. The main myths surrounding the Cuban exodus are the idealised vision of pre-revolutionary Cuba known as the Cuba de ayer, and the legendary financial success of Cuban exiles known as "Golden exiles", comprises the Cuban success story.

The idea of the Cuba de ayer (English translation: lit. ':Cuba of yesterday') is a mythologized idyllic view of Cuba before the overthrow of the Batista government in the Cuban Revolution. This idealized vision of pre-revolutionary Cuba typically reinforces the ideas that Cuba before 1959 was an elegant, sophisticated, and largely white country that was ruined by the government of Fidel Castro. The Cuban exiles who fled after 1959 are viewed as majorly white, and had no general desire to leave Cuba but did so to flee tyranny. Cuban exiles who uphold this image of the Cuba de ayer view their version of Cuban culture as more desirable than American culture, and that it is best to recreate their lost culture of the Cuba de ayer in the United States. Proponents of the image of the Cuba de ayer also view Cuba as a more worthy country to live in than the United States and hope to return Cuba to the Cuba de ayer after the hoped for fall of the government of Fidel Castro. Critics of the idea of the Cuba de ayer claim it is a nationalist myth created for white Cuban exiles that ignores the reality of Cuban life before 1959, and embraces an exotic vision of Cuba.

Social researcher Jorge Duany has argued that the myth of the "Golden exiles" or the idea that most Cuban exiles are wealthy, well educated, and highly skilled unlike other immigrant populations, "does not do justice to the complex and diverse experiences" of the Cuban-American community. He states that many Cuban exiles face cultural and economic challenges resettling in the United States similar to many other American immigrant communities. He also states that as the Cuban exile progressed since 1959 more and more economically disenfranchised Cubans became part of the emigrant waves. These lower class Cuban exiles became noticeable in the Freedom Flights and especially so in the Mariel boatlift and balseros afterwards.

Maria Torres wrote in the Chicago Tribune that contrary to the Golden exile myth, Cubans are not entirely racially white but from various racial backgrounds and at the time the article was written in 1986, Cuban American families statistically earned less money than the average white family.

== See also ==
- 2021–2023 Cuban migration crisis
- Cuba-United States relations
- Cuban-American lobby
- Opposition to Fidel Castro
- Cuban boat people
- Haitian boat people
- Vietnamese boat people
- North Korean defectors
- Venezuelan refugee crisis
