= Operations Safe Haven and Safe Passage =

1994 humanitarian mission by the United States

- Part of the 1994 Cuban rafter crisis
- Location: Panama
- Objective: Alleviate overcrowding of Cuban refugees at Guantanamo Bay Naval Base
- Executed by: United States
- Outcome: Rioting and flight of Cuban refugees Later relocation of Cuban refugees back to Guantanamo Naval Base
- Casualties: 200 military personnel 30 Cuban refugees

Operations Safe Haven and Safe Passage (September 8, 1994 – March 15, 1995) were operations by the United States Joint Task Force designed to relieve the overcrowded migrant camps at Guantanamo Bay Naval Base. Safe Haven established four camps on Empire Range, Panama, to provide a safe haven for up to ten thousand Cuban migrants. Safe Passage then returned the migrants to Guantanamo after the crowded conditions could be alleviated. These migrants had attempted to enter the United States illegally by crossing the Florida Straits in summer 1994. The operation was conducted under the command of General Barry McCaffrey and the direction of Clinton administration.

== History ==
=== Relocation ===
Operation Safe Haven began in September 1994, when the first Cubans arrived in Panama from Guantanamo. Camps were established in Panama as a result of an agreement between the US and Panamanian governments that permitted the Cubans to remain in Panama for six months. Cuban migrants continued to arrive until the camps reached their peak occupancy of 8,600. Of these 8,600, approximately 1,280 Cubans entered the United States in mid-October 1994 as a result of a program of parole entry by the US Department of Justice. In addition, 110 Cubans were accepted by Spain, and 10 by Venezuela.

=== Disturbances ===
Due in part to uncertainty about their future, some of the Cuban migrants became increasingly restless as the weeks went by. The growing tension led to disturbances and riots on December 7–8, 1994, which were quickly controlled by US military members. During the riots, more than 200 US military personnel and 30 Cubans were injured and at least 2 Cuban migrants drowned in the Panama Canal while attempting to flee from the camps. There was also considerable property damage, including the destruction of various military vehicles, computers, and telephones.

Approximately three days after the initial riot, a joint operation took place to regain control of camp five, the last camp under Cuban immigrant control. The Cuban migrants were taken into custody and the instigators and leaders of the riots were identified.

During the riots, the 258th Military Police Co. partnered with Marine forces to stop rioting Cuban immigrants who had broken out of the camps and were making their way to Panama City. The fighting during this engagement went back and forth, until 2nd Ranger Battalion, 1st Battalion 502nd Infantry Regiment, and 5th/87th Infantry retook the camps. Other personnel there were the 2nd Rangers, 2nd Battalion 505th Airborne Infantry, 82d Airborne Division (with 2nd Platoon from C-co, 307th Engineers (CBT) (ABN) embedded), 2nd Battalion 502 Infantry Regiment and the 194th Army Military Police of the 101st ABN (AASLT) division. The 8th Engineer Battalion of the 1st Cavalry Division was deployed in a no-notice deployment December 1994 at the start of the riots bringing M113 Armored Personnel Carriers to provide additional riot support. After the riots were contained, the 8th EN BN remained to serve security patrol for the 5 camps for the duration of Operation Safe Haven making numerous contributions to the engineering and sustainment of the mission. Also present was the 170th MP CO from Ft Lewis, WA. No U.S. soldiers were killed during the confrontation, but over 400 were injured.

=== Jailing of rioters ===
After the riots took place a fifth camp was established to house the leaders of the riots and any individual who seemed a threat. Camp five housed both men and women. It also contained a high-security jail system that placed individuals into individual cells. 5th Bttn 87th Infantry, Fort Davis Panama, was the primary US Army unit conducting security operations. Camp five was staffed by Air Force Security Police from the 17th SPS Goodfellow A.F.B. San Angelo, Texas also 97 SFS Altus AFB Oklahoma and 314th SFS Little Rock AFB, Arkansas. The 258th Military Police Company out of Ft. Polk, Louisiana was initially in charge of securing and patrolling Camp three.

=== Return ===
As the expiration of the US–Panamanian agreement permitting the Cubans to stay in Panama approached, planning began for Operation Safe Passage—the return of the Cubans to Guantanamo Bay Naval Facility. Between February 1, 1995, and February 20, 1995, 7,300 Cubans were transported from Panama to Guantanamo Naval Base. The mission of the transfer operation was to move the Cuban migrants from Safe Haven camps in Panama to Guantanamo in a safe, orderly manner. The repatriation of the nearly 8,000 Cubans was carried out by the Air Force’s Security Police. A headquarters element from HQ Air Combat Command led by Colonel Dick Coleman, Air Movement Commander and Chief Master Sergeant Terry Wettig, Task Force Leader organized, trained and equipped a team of nearly 600 Security Police men and women. Airlift support was provided by Air Mobility Command aircrews using C-141 and C-130 aircraft and involved five flights per day. The operation was successful and carried out without major incidents.

== Awards ==
US military members who directly participated in Operation Safe Haven were awarded the following:

- Humanitarian Service Medal (26 August 94 - 3 March 95)
- Joint Meritorious Unit Award (26 August 94 - 1 March 95)
- Aerial Achievement Medal (Safe Passage)

== Medical support ==
A 50-bed Air Transportable Hospital (ATH) was deployed from Minot Air Force Base, North Dakota. The hospital was staffed with medical personnel from Minot, Offutt Air Force Base, Nebraska and Barksdale Air Force Base, Louisiana. The ATH was expanded to 125 beds as the medical needs of the refugees increased.

== See also ==
- Wet feet, dry feet policy
