= Golden exile =

1959–62 emigration of Cubans

- Part of the Cuban post-revolution exodus
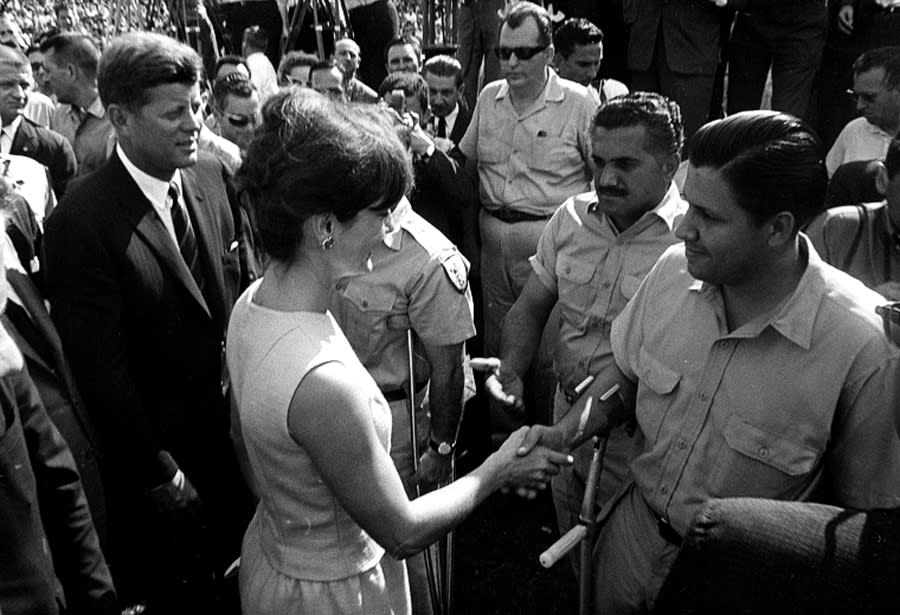
- Cuban exiles in Brigade 2506 meeting President Kennedy
- Date: 1959–1962
- Location: Cuba
- Also known as: Historical exile
- Cause: Aftermath of the Cuban Revolution; Opposition to Fidel Castro
- Outcome: 250,000 Cubans emigrate; Operation Peter Pan initiated

The emigration of Cubans, from the 1959 Cuban Revolution to October of 1962, has been dubbed the golden exile and the first emigration wave in the greater post-revolution exodus. The 1959-1962 exodus was referred to as the "Golden exile" because of the mainly upper and middle class character of the emigrants. After the success of the revolution various Cubans who had allied themselves or worked with the overthrown Batista regime fled the country. Later as the Fidel Castro government began nationalizing industries many Cuban professionals would flee the island. This period of the Cuban exile is also referred to as the historical exile, mainly by those who emigrated during this period.

== History ==
=== 1959–1960 ===
The first to emigrate after the revolution were those who were associated or worked for the old Batista regime. The U.S. embassy in Havana and consulate in Santiago would regularly grant visas to Cubans wishing to leave.

By the middle of 1959 various new policies had affected Cuban life such as the redistribution of property, nationalization of religious and private schools, and the banning of racially exclusive social clubs. Those that began to leave the island were driven by them being negatively affected by new economic policies, their distaste with new national public schools, or anxiety over government supported racial integration. The government would quickly label exiles who left as "racists", discouraging Afro-Cubans to also emigrate. These conditions caused the majority of those who emigrated to be either upper or middle class, white, and catholic. Many middle class emigrants were often professionals that were tied to American companies that were nationalized.

Many of the emigrants that would leave believed they would be returning soon to Cuba, believing the U.S. would soon intervene and overthrow the Fidel Castro government. Some of those exiled in the United States would organize a militant resistance to the Fidel Castro government.

The 1960 United States census stated that there were over 124,000 Cubans in the United States. In response to the exodus of Cubans the U.S. government established programs to provide social services and resources to arriving Cubans.

The flight of many skilled workers after the revolution caused a “brain drain.” This loss of trained professionals sparked a renovation of the Cuban education system to accommodate the education of new professionals to replace those that had emigrated.

=== 1961 ===
On January 3, 1961 the United States broke off diplomatic relations with Cuba and afterwards emigrants gained visas for humanitarian reasons, and after arriving in the United States they could apply for parole and gain refugee status.

In April of 1961 the Bay of Pigs Invasion consisting of many militant and anti-fidelista Cuban exiles would fail to take over Cuba. Afterwards those who would choose to emigrate would view their decision as a permanent one. Fidel Castro would then term those leaving "gusanos" (worms).

Growing controversy in Cuba with the nationalization of Catholic schools spurred the development of Operation Peter Pan to relocate children to the United States.

=== 1962 ===
During the Cuban Missile Crisis of October 1962, travel between the United States and Cuba became restricted. Afterwards Cuban emigration would occur using makeshift vessels illegally leaving Cuba. From 1959 to the end of open travel in 1962 around 250,000 Cubans left the island.

== Characteristics ==
=== Demographics ===
Researcher Jorge Duany claims the majority of exiles were urban, middle-aged, well-educated, light-skinned, and white-collar workers, who emigrated primarily for religious, or political reasons. He also claims that while the first emigrants left because they were old Bastianos, those after left because of disillusionment with the new government and because economic reforms and nationalizations of American companies had harmed their professions. Researchers Irving Louis Horowitz and Jaime Suchlick have claimed about half of those who emigrated by the Second Wave were blue collar workers and many of those were agricultural workers and fishermen. They also proposed many left because of Cuba's new rationing system and mandatory military service.

Horowitz and Suchlick claim that while most emigrants were not involved in militant movements a majority did financially support them until later becoming disillusioned after the failures of such movements.

=== Emigration process ===
Cubans who requested exit permits would be fired from their job if they worked for a government enterprise. Officials from Committees for the Defense of the Revolution would take inventory of all property of the applicant emigrant, once inventoried the applicant could not sell or give away any of their property. All property and money would be confiscated from them when finally leaving the country, and most exiles left with only a suitcase of clothing in their possession. By 1960 the United States had established the Cuban Refugee Emergency Center which supplied exiles with food, money, clothing, medical aid, adult education, and plane tickets to locations that had humanitarian organizations that were caring for new arrivals.

Once in the United States many exiles adopted blue-collar jobs. The notably affluent majority of exiles had now become mostly middle or lower class. In Miami discrimination was still commonplace towards Cuban immigrants and many were barred from renting certain properties or membership in trade unions. This discrimination helped foster the Cuban community of Little Havana, where Cubans could remain close to Catholic churches and school's offering charitable aid. Many exiles' were able to use already attained professional skills to eventually better their occupations, and contribute to building Miami's Cuban business enclave.

== Legacy ==
=== Desire to return ===
Of the many exiles who came immediately after 1959, many considered their exile to be temporary, because the Castro government was viewed as bound to fall soon. It was believed that once the Castro government eventually fell, the exiles would return to Cuba, and resume their lives as they were before the Cuban Revolution.

Throughout the 1960s, to compliment a sense of temporary exile, many Cuban emigrants attempted to preserve their Cuban identity by opening Cuban educational institutions for their children while living in exile. With the cancellation of the Freedom Flights in the 1970s, and the entrance of Cuban emigrants from the 1980 Mariel boatlift, a shift developed in the self-perception of Cuban exiles. There was a growing sense that the Castro government was surviving for the long-term, and that their residence outside Cuba would also be long-term. With this shift, came a greater involvement in American politics, and the solidification of the Cuban business district in Little Havana.

=== "Golden exile" identity ===
The Cuban success story or sometimes referred to as the "myth of the golden exile", is the idea that Cuban exiles that came to the United States after the 1959 Cuban Revolution were mostly or exclusively political exiles who were white, largely conservative, and financially successful. The idea garnered traction starting in the 1960s via rags-to-riches stories of Cuban exiles in the US news media, and became widely promoted within the Cuban American community.

The identity of "golden exile" has been used in Cuban-American circles as an identity to distinguish Cuban Americans who are seen as racially white and exuding conservative values as compared to Cuban Americans who came later in the Cuban exile who may have darker skin. The term "golden exile" has also been used in discussions involving immigration as a term to glorify Cuban immigrants as anti-communist political refugees and productive members of the middle class. This term has spurred controversy due to statistics countering this image.

=== "Cuba de ayer" mythos ===
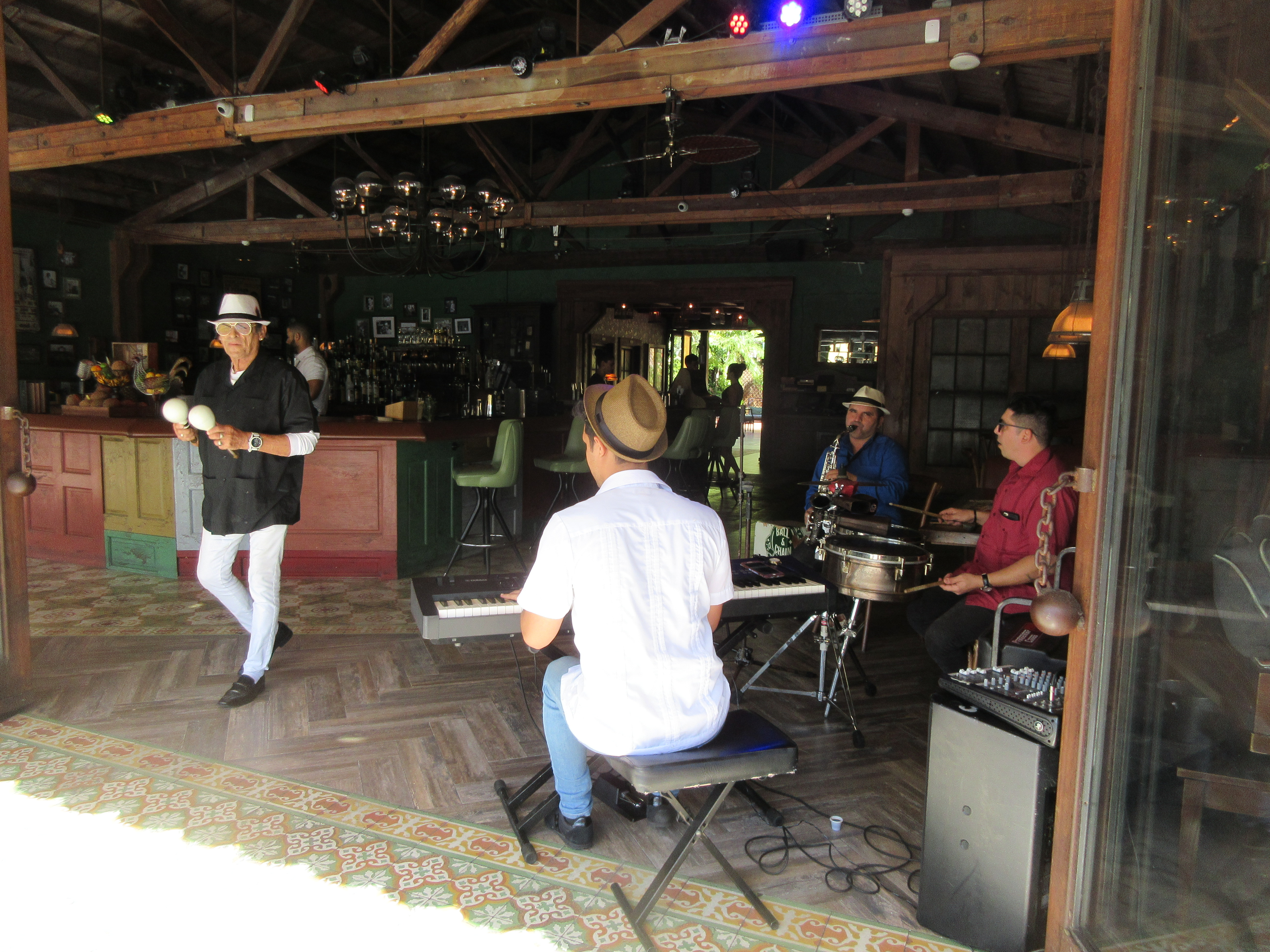
Cuban band wearing traditional Cuban clothing at a bar in Little Havana.

This first wave of upper-class emigrants from Cuba in the immediate years after the Cuban Revolution would leave the island with only memories of Cuba from the era of Fulgencio Batista. These memories formed the genesis of the idealized image of the Cuba de ayer ("Cuba of yesterday" in English). The Cuban exiles who came immediately after the revolution where largely shocked by American racism which differed in expression from Cuban racism. In Cuba no formal de jure racial segregation existed. Whatever social manifestations of racism existed in Cuba were often ignored or unknown to the upper-class white emigres arriving in Miami. The sight of formal racial segregation in the American south by Cuban exiles reinforced the idea that the Cuba de ayer was free of racism unlike the United States.

The reconstruction of outlawed businesses and social organizations in Cuba by exiles now in Miami, reaffirmed the memories of the idyllic Cuba de ayer. This reconstruction came from the waning of a hope to return to a Cuba without Fidel Castro in power, so Cuban exiles began to model their communities in the image of the Cuba de ayer. The most notable of these communities is Miami's Little Havana neighborhood. Little Havana became an epicenter for Cuban life in Miami, specifically in how many institutions are Cuban owned and modeled in the image of nostalgia for the Cuba de ayer.

== See also ==
- Balseros (rafters)
