= Haitian boat people =

Refugees from Haiti who flee by boat

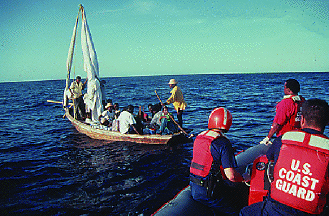
Haitian refugees intercepted by US Coast Guard in 1998.

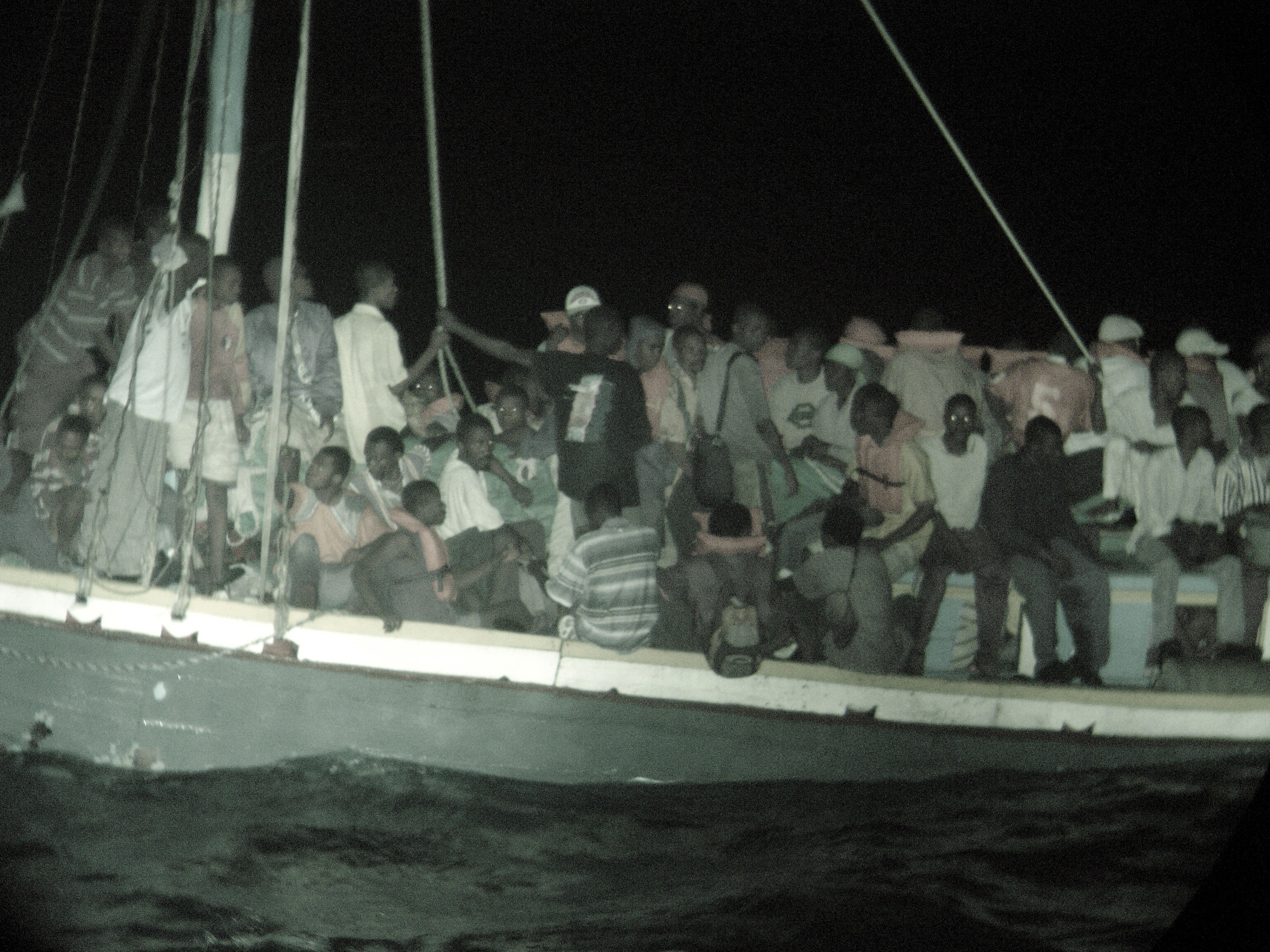
Boat people from Haiti

Haitian boat people are refugees from Haiti who flee the country by boat, usually to South Florida and sometimes the Bahamas.

The first reports of refugees fleeing Haiti by boat to the United States began in 1972. In the 1980 Mariel boatlift, many Haitian boat people joined the exodus from Cuba to take refuge in the United States. Between 1972 and 1981 around 55,000 boat people had arrived in Florida, but many escaped U.S. detection so the number may be around 100,000. Around 50,000 landed in the Bahamas during the 1980s. Before 1981 all Haitian entrants to the United States were detained and if not considered political refugees, were sent back to Haiti. After 1981 all Haitian refugees intercepted by the U.S. Coast Guard were immediately sent back to Haiti. After political turmoil in Haiti in 1991 around 40,000 boat people attempted to sail to the United States. Many were detained at Guantanamo Bay where they were interviewed to see if they were seeking political asylum. Many were later granted asylum.

== Deaths ==
It is estimated that thousands of rafters have died at sea in their flight to the United States, as any failed attempt to cross the sea by raft ends in drowning.

The appearing of mobile phones with GPS and not-terrestrial satellite phones has increased the possibilities of survival, because they allow to call through the satellite to ask for help, even being in the middle of the sea at a long distance from the coast.

== See also ==
- Cuban boat people
- Balseros
