= Cuban boat people =

Refugee migrants from Cuba during the Castro regime

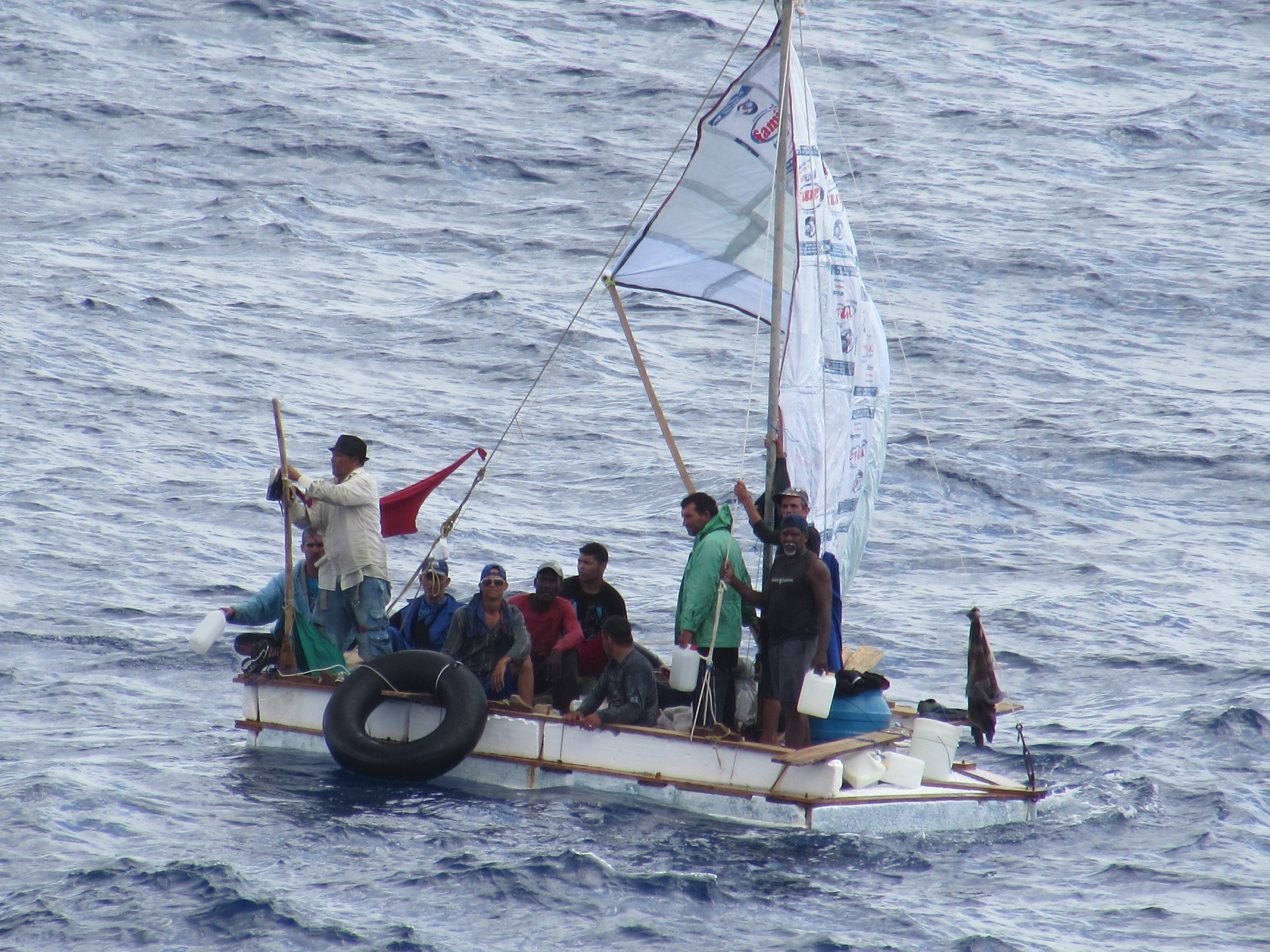
Cuban refugees spotted and rescued by Carnival Liberty in 2014.

Cuban boat people mainly refers to refugees who flee Cuba by boat and ship to the United States. There have been four distinct waves of immigration, both legal and illegal, from Cuba to the United States. These four waves include early boat arrivals, the marielitos, the balseros, and the post "Wet foot, dry foot" arrivals. These waves can be attributed to specific periods in Cuba's socioeconomic decline and stages in Cuban–U.S. relations. Since the 1960s, the process by which balseros would immigrate would become increasingly difficult and dangerous leading to a variety of controversy, both legislative and humanitarian.

== History ==
Cuban immigration to the U.S. via boat occurred in waves shaped by political and economic crises. Early exiles (1961–1965) fled Castro's regime, often via small boats. The Mariel Boatlift (1973–1980) saw over 125,000 Cubans, including "undesirables," migrate amid economic struggles. The Balsero Crisis (1993–1995) involved 35,000 Cubans on makeshift rafts. After the 2017 repeal of "wet-foot, dry-foot," smaller-scale migration persists, with stricter U.S. policies. Each wave reflects Cuba's hardships and evolving U.S. responses.

=== Early boat arrivals, 1961–1965 ===
The first major wave of Cuban boat people came after the failure of the Bay of Pigs Invasion and the Cuban Missile Crisis, which ended a "temporary exile status" period of commercial air travel between the United States and Cuba, which was positively received by the American public. This had seen a score of roughly 125,000 Cuban exiles reach U.S. soil that were to return upon an overthrown Castro regime that never happened. The majority of these migrants were part of the wealthier class, hence they were ones most affected by Cuba's socialist transition and the nationalization of the economy.

During this time, the United States Coast Guard would make no attempt to turn back undocumented Cubans who were usually arriving in small boats. Afterwards, Cubans who wished to come to the United States, would have to do so illegally by crossing the Florida Straits, or travel to other countries. Between 1962 and 1965 around 6,700 Cubans arrived in Florida in makeshift boats and other vessels. Emigrants were not given a process of migration until the Camarioca boatlift in 1965.

=== "Marielitos" (1973–1980) ===
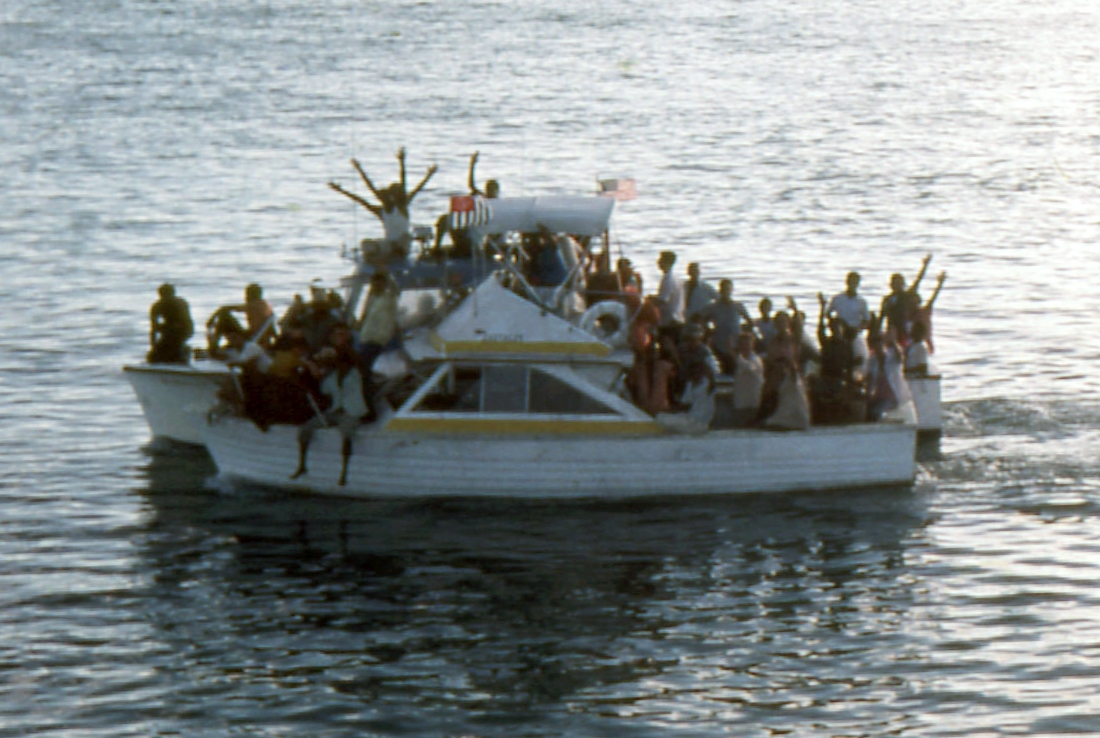
Two boats sailing during the Mariel Boatlift.

As relations with Cuba slowly and steadily improved, a foreign policy that enacted a migration intervention to begin a 7-year program of passages called the Mariel boatlift, which was perceived to 'aid Cuba at ridding itself of undesirables', was met with little public support. After stages of these initial trips, Vice President Walter Mondale of the Carter administration served to justify this political position by stating there "is no better proof of the failure of Castro's revolution than the dramatic exodus which is currently taking place." Observing the economic successes of those who left and the failure of the Cuban economy post-revolution, the Marielitos were motivated by economic opportunity. This specific group mainly consisted of a – younger and more Afro-Cuban demographic. There was a growing stigma that surrounded marielitos as they were not viewed as romantically as the initial exiles. Even though President Jimmy Carter welcomed migrants in with open arms, it was not well received, as the image of a criminal grew rampant among the public eye, even though it were only about 10–20% of them. Castro had called these people the escoria ("scum") of his country: the "homosexuals, drug addicts, and gambling addicts". Castro successfully painted this image of the Marielitos, leaving stigmas and stereotypes that endure to present day.

=== "Balseros" (1993–1995) ===
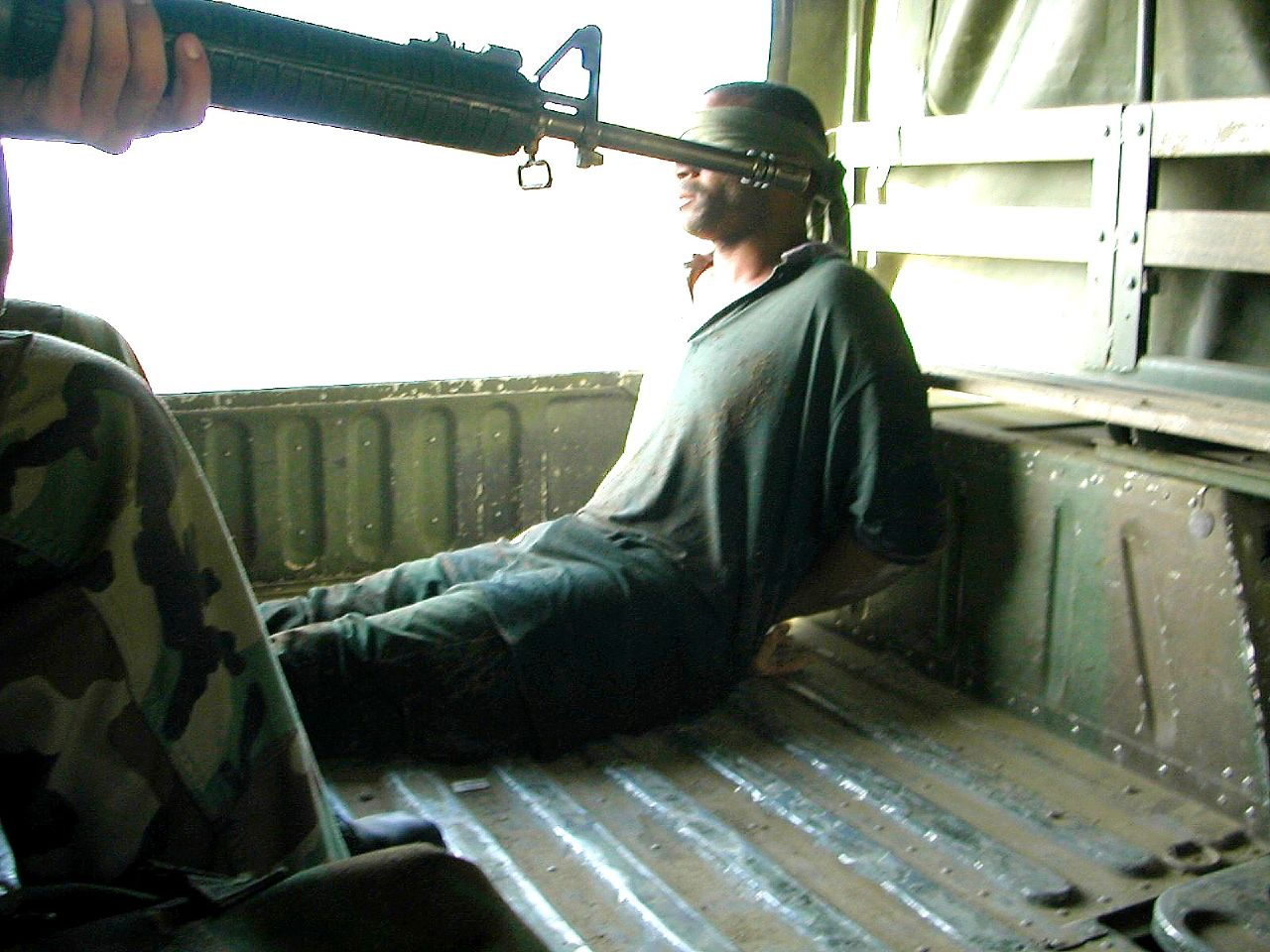
A Cuban migrant detained at the Guantanamo Bay Naval Base.

After years of economic decline since the Mariel boatlift, a few thousand Cuban boat people had made their way to the U.S. in 1993 after a rise from a few hundred in 1989. After riots ensued in Havana after threatening speeches made by Castro in 1994, he announced that any Cuban who wished to leave the island could. Around 35,000 rafters left the island after the announcement and 40,000 Cubans in total were intercepted by the U.S. Coast Guard that year. A daily average of 50 Cuban migrants were intercepted by the U.S. Coast Guard off the southeastern coast of Florida in the month of July 1994.

U.S. President Bill Clinton announced that any rafters intercepted at sea would be detained at the Guantanamo Bay Naval Base. Around 31,000 rafters would be detained at the base, which became known as the Balsero crisis. This period of detainment lasted roughly two years with an eventual compromise between the United States and Cuba resulting in a choice for those in custody to return to Cuba or take the gamble of acquiring a United States visa. These "Balseros" (Spanish: rafters) as these boat people were known during this time, were known to wash up to shore at the Floridian coast on any conceivable thing that could float such as on wooden rafts or truck tires. These homemade rafts became so prevalent that it became a business in Cuba to construct and sell them. Other Cubans wishing to flee went to the extent of hijacking four vessels owned by the state.

==== Victims of "13 de Marzo" v. Cuba ====
A complaint was filed with the Inter-American Commission on Human Rights on July 19, 1994 regarding an old tugboat with 72 people on board, who were attempting to flee Cuba hours before dawn on July 13 [1994], who were attacked with pressurized water hose equipment just 7 miles off the coast of Cuba by 4 boats organized by the Cuban State. The boat named 13 de Marzo, eventually sank with a death toll of 41, which included 10 minors after the cries of women and children for it to stop were in vain.

The Cuban government argued that 13 de Marzo was stolen at a dock and that authorities were attempting to intercept it. Days following the tragedy, the Cuban government was requested to recover the bodies from the bottom of the sea but declined citing the lack of experienced divers. Instead, a nonprofit organization named Hermanos al Rescate (Brothers to the Rescue), whose mission is to rescue boat people attempting to leave Cuba, made a request to the Cuban government to recover these bodies themselves but were denied.

=== Wet feet, dry feet policy ===
In an attempt to control the influx of boat people, the Clinton administration agreed to grant 20,000 visas annually for Cubans who wished asylum, which became known as the wet feet, dry feet policy. This policy allowed the U.S. Coast Guard to return defectors – found at sea and equalized the proportion of visas being granted to Cuban immigrants compared to immigrants from other countries. This policy simultaneously repealed the "safe haven camps" that were previously instituted to detain roughly 28,000 Cubans. This policy replaced the original Cuban Adjustment Act and provided a stricter control over immigration.

=== Post wet foot, dry foot arrivals ===
Fearing that the end of the wet feet, dry feet policy was near after an announcement by Barack Obama in December 2014 regarding possible changes to the Cuban Adjustment Act, there was an increased concern by the U.S. Coast Guard about a possible spike in boat people, which they had intercepted an increased 117% more Cubans in 2014 than the previous year.

In 2017, the wet feet, dry feet policy finally came to an end. Fewer Cubans attempted to make the journey to the United States. Those who manage to arrive in Florida would only be able to remain legally by applying for political asylum. The manner in which Cubans now defect, usually to the United States, is far more complicated. These new courses of immigration often involve elaborate paths through countries such as Mexico and Puerto Rico. In recent years, direct defection to the United States is usually done via plane. Other more sophisticated operations have formed with the use of speedboats. These operations provide a higher level of guarantee that those fleeing will be able to achieve "dry feet".

== Deaths ==
Those fleeing often endure dangerous conditions and do not have the experience to handle such an excursion. It is estimated that thousands of balseros has perished at sea in their flight away from Cuba. These conditions have led to crises like the case of Elian Gonzalez. Elian was a child at the time when he survived a failed balsero operation, during which his mother and her partner drowned along with other passengers. Events like these have led to outcry from the international community, especially in regards to the humanitarian aspect of those fleeing.

Any failed attempt to cross the sea by raft can end in drowning (with the same characteristics about drowning prevention and drowning management). The journey across the Florida straits contains several risks such as sharks, rough waters, drug and human trafficking routes.

The appearing of mobile phones with GPS and not-terrestrial satellite phones has increased the possibilities of survival, because they allow people to call through the satellite to ask for help, even being in the middle of the sea at a long distance from the coast.

== See also ==
- Haitian boat people
