= Freedom Flights =

1965–1973 flights from Cuba to Miami

- Part of the Cuban exodus
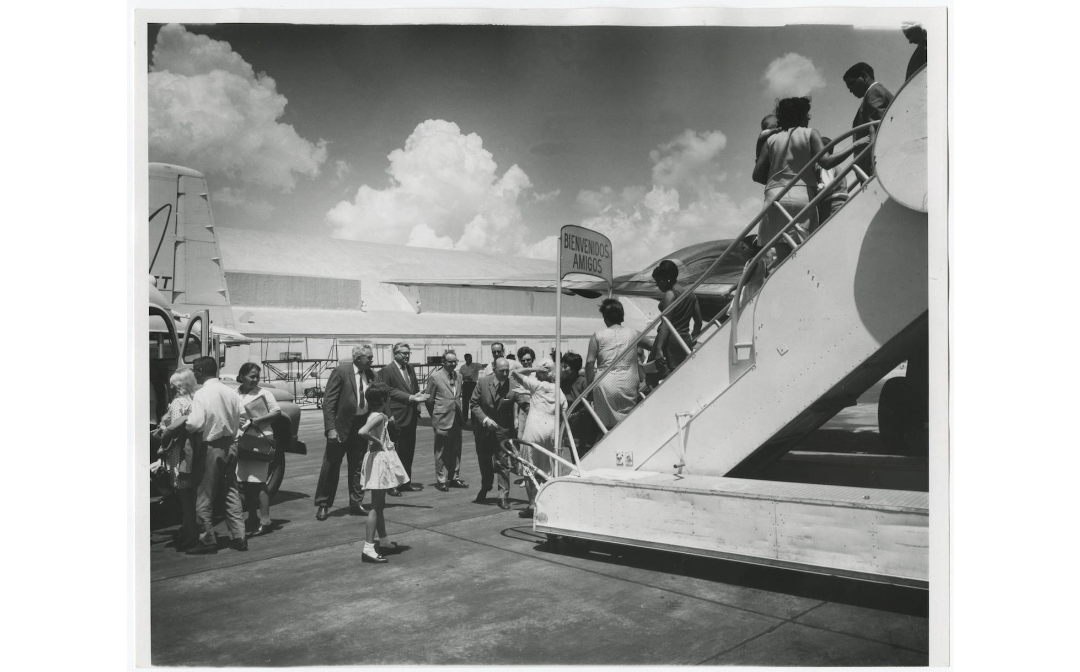
- Cuban refugees exiting a Freedom Flight in Miami.
- Date: 1965 – 1973
- Location: Cuba United States
- Cause: Dangers of the Camarioca boatlift
- Budget: $12,000,000
- Organised by: Government of Cuba; Government of the United States
- Participants: 300,000 Cuban refugees
- Outcome: Cuban refugees arrive in the United States; Solidification of Little Havana; "Brain drain" in Cuba

Freedom Flights (known in Spanish as Los vuelos de la libertad) transported Cubans to Miami twice daily, five times per week from 1965 to 1973. Its budget was about $12 million and it brought an estimated 300,000 refugees, making it the "largest airborne refugee operation in American history." The Freedom Flights were an important and unusual chapter of cooperation in the history of Cuban-American foreign relations, which is otherwise characterized by mutual distrust. The program changed the ethnic makeup of Miami and fueled the growth of the Cuban-American enclave there.

== Background ==
=== Previous emigration ===
Political discontent led to the 1959 Cuban Revolution, which caused the beginning of massive Cuban-American immigration. Those factors combined to create in Cuba an atmosphere that was, according to scholar Aviva Chomsky, "ripe for revolution," which Castro exploited to gain power. In the immediate wake of the revolution, emigration started with the most affluent classes. Although many pro-Batista corrupted government officials were among those first exiles, it was soon followed by thousands of disenchanted middle-class Cubans of all ethnicities.

=== Immigration and Nationality Act of 1965 ===
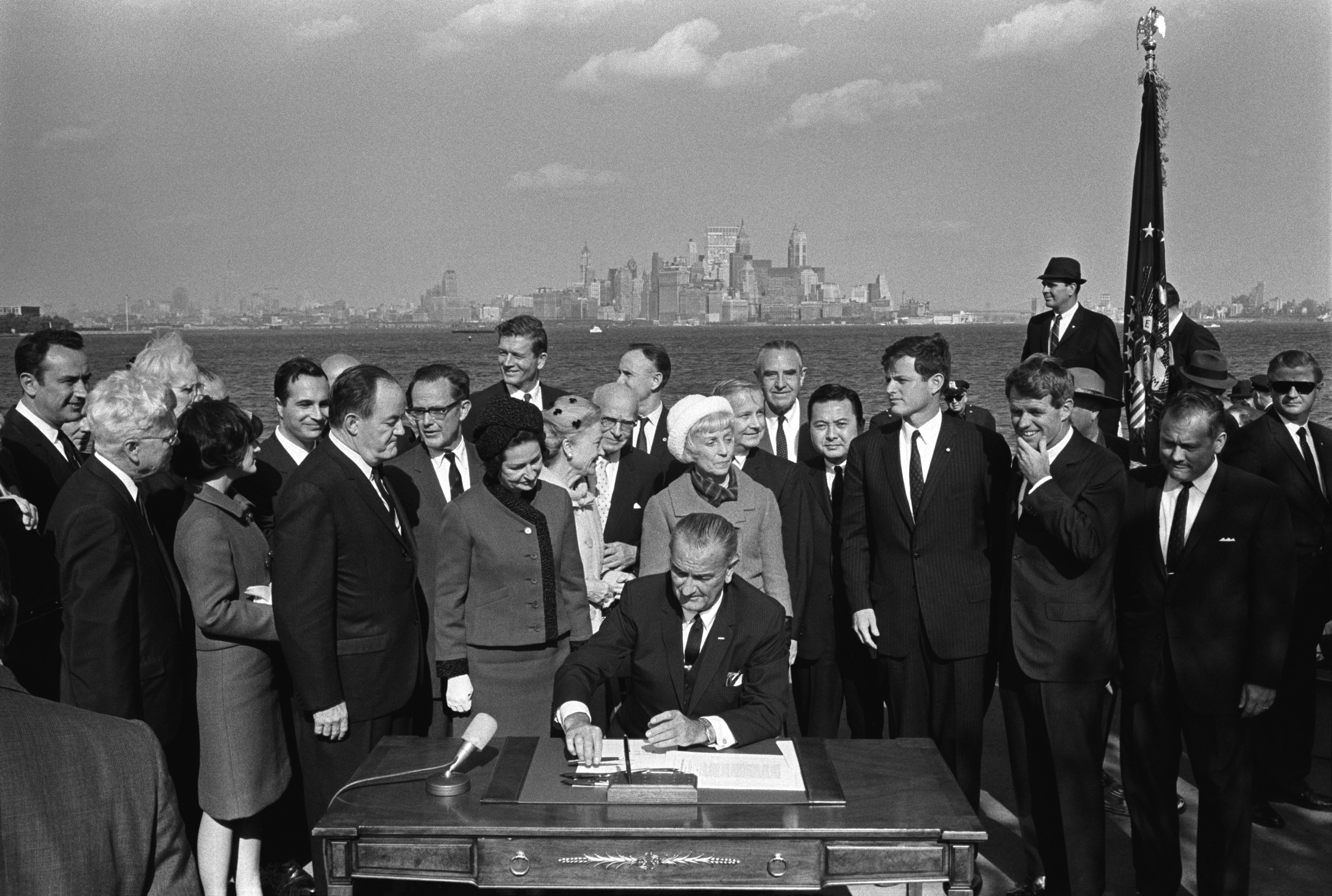
President Lyndon B. Johnson signing the Immigration Act of 1965.

In the United States the Immigration Act of 1924 put in immigration quotas that favored immigrants from Northern and Western Europe, and completely banned Arabs, Indians, and other Asians. As the civil rights movement gained momentum in the United States, laws that discriminated based on an individual's ethnicity or race began to be repealed. With the gaining traction of the civil rights movement the Immigration and Nationality Act of 1965 was passed which ended the previous national quotas and bans on immigration and created a seven category preference system that emphasized family reunification.

After the passing of the bill President Lyndon B. Johnson declared in a speech in front of the Statue of Liberty that Cubans and all others who want asylum should be given a chance to get it. He stated:

I declare this afternoon to the people of Cuba that those who seek refuge here in America will find it.... Our tradition as an asylum for the oppressed is going to be upheld.

=== Camarioca boatlift ===
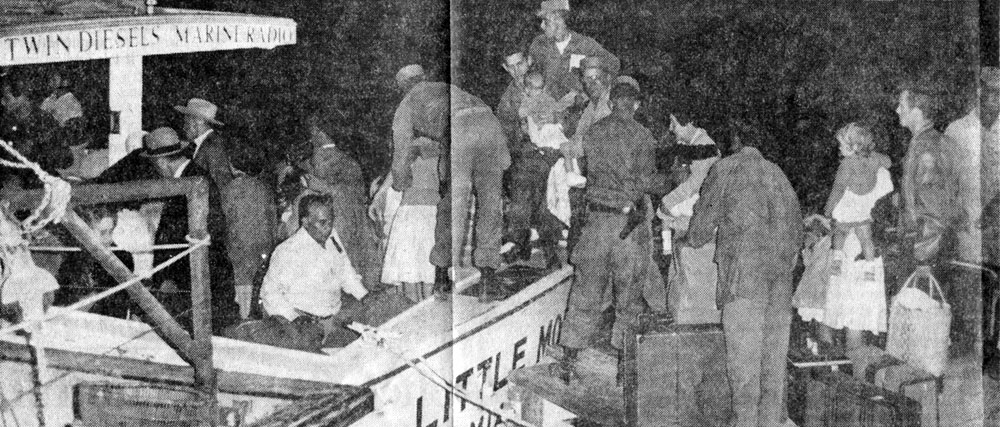
Cuban militia-men help refugees onto a boat in Camarioca, Cuba.

When Castro's policies began to take shape, a large wave of disillusioned immigrants crashed on South Florida's beaches. A chaotic episode of this wave of immigration, the Camarioca boatlifts in 1965, led to unusual cooperation between the Cuban and American governments, the enactment of the Freedom Flights program. On September 28, Castro announced that dissidents could leave through the port of Camarioca, in the province of Matanzas. The chaotic scene of thousands of boats dangerously attempting to traverse the Florida Straits and enter the safety of American soil illegally prompted action by the United States, whose Coast Guard found itself overwhelmed.

=== Cuban Adjustment Act ===
The Cuban Adjustment Act of 1966 revised Cubans' immigrant status as "parolees" and offered a unique route to permanent residency. Cuban immigrants were initially assigned the temporary status of "parolees" because it was assumed that they would return to the island shortly. It soon became clear, however, that return would not be forthcoming, causing the United States to offer Cubans a path to permanent residency. The law granted Cubans preferential treatment, "a clerical loophole co-sponsored by Senator Edward Kennedy to expedite entry to the United States for Freedom Flight Cubans." It effectively gave Cubans an "open-ended entitlement [to permanent residence]" in the United States.

Cubans were given preferential treatment in the United States for four main reasons: Cold War politics, reduction of administrative burdens for immigrants, humanitarian concerns, and Cuban professionals' potential impact on the United States economy. The United States government was concerned that Cuba would serve as a model for leftist revolution. It was also concerned that the Soviet Union would exploit Cuba's strategic location. By facilitating a mass exodus from Cuba, the Cuban Adjustment Act effectively created a "brain drain" of human capital that destabilized the Castro regime, undermined the legitimacy of an oppressive government, and fostered anticommunist public sentiment that would garner support for massive Cold War spending programs. The act also reduced administrative burdens for immigrants.

Under prior law, the Cuban refugee needed to leave the country, obtain a visa from a US consular office abroad, and re-enter the country. The act created an easier avenue for Cuban-American immigrants to secure their residency. Humanitarian concerns further motivated the legislation, as the United States committed itself to facilitate dissidents' exodus from political persecution in Castro's post-revolutionary state. There were more practical concerns, as well. Many of the early refugees were highly skilled professionals in Cuba's economic elite and so could contribute to American production. The Senate Report in the Act's legislative history notes, "the talents and skills of many of the refugees, particularly in the professional field... will be put to use in the national interest".

=== Establishment of emigration program ===
For its part, the Cuban government was receptive to establishing a safe and orderly program, as the sight of thousands of citizens risking their lives to leave the country reflected poorly on the Castro administration. The two countries engaged in unusually mutual negotiations despite Cuba's anti-American sentiment and the US ideological opposition to communism. The negotiations resulted in the creation of the Freedom Flights program. The first Freedom Flight took place on December 1, 1965. Through these negotiations the U.S and Cuba agreed upon two flights a day to leave from Varadero Cuba. These chartered flights continued until April 1973. In total, there were 3048 flights total that allowed 297,318 refugees to migrate to the United States.

== Exodus ==
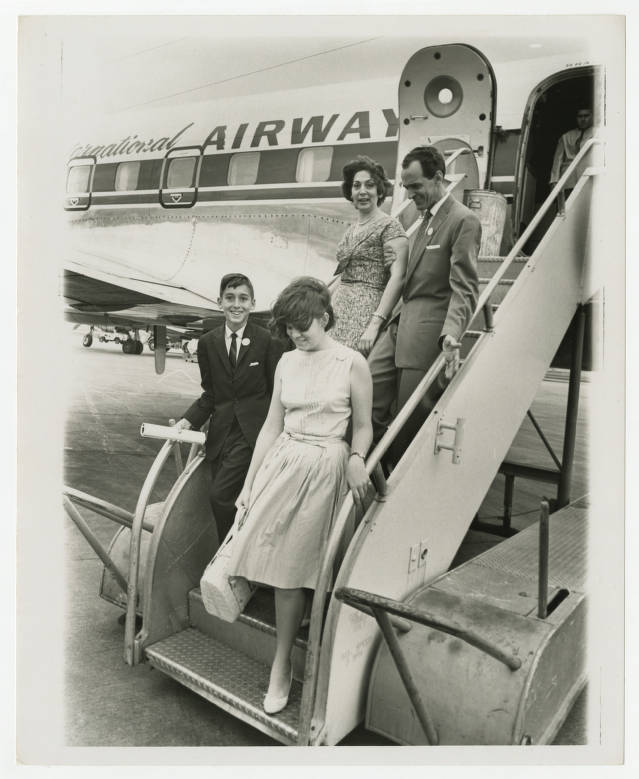
The Mejias family arriving in Miami from a Freedom Flight, 1966.

=== Emigrant motivations ===
Many Cubans were eager to leave the country in pursuit of freedom. Critics saw Castro as a classical Latin American caudillo, a ruler who treated the country like his personal property. The government suppressed religion and confiscated private property. A climate of fear prevailed over all aspects of life. Silvio, a Cuban, remarks, "Everyone lives in fear all the time." A Cuban-American, Octavio, observes, "Cuba itself was a prison". The US promised a different climate. María Rodríguez recounts the emotional story of first seeing the country: "I cried quietly while kissing the [American] flag and said a prayer.... For the first time in my life, I felt free."

During the nationalization of small businesses in the Revolutionary Offensive, some small merchants decided to leave Cuba in the airlift.

=== Race, gender, and socioeconomic status ===
Refugees of the Freedom Flight era were more likely to be women or elderly people than working age men because of emigration restrictions. Those who emigrated were also more likely to be in the working class with about 57% of refugees within that socioeconomic class. The largest class of migrants underrepresented were black Cubans as racism during the Jim Crow era, hopes of a better life after revolution, and U.S immigration policy that favored family reunification, led to black Cubans being less than 3% of Cuban Migrants in the U.S in 1970.

=== Persecution in Cuba ===
Although the Castro government initially allowed citizens to leave, it would eventually discourage emigration by harassing and humiliating Cubans who signed up for the program. The program quickly gained popularity; by March 1968, over one million people were on the waiting list. Those on the waitlist were fired from their jobs, deemed "enemies of the state," and hassled by members of the Committees for the Defense of the Revolution (CDRs). Some were interned in camps far from their homes and families, and their property was confiscated upon their departure. Castro also referred to those who left as gusanos (worms) and insisted to the Cuban people that Cuba was better off without them because the gusanos were the bourgeoisie, who had capitalized on them in the earlier system. The actions worked only minimally. Although one million people were on the waitlist in March 1968, a Chicago Tribune poll in April 1966 found that almost two million Cubans wanted to leave.

=== Social effects ===
Despite the intense hardship that the Castro government threatened and delivered, the Freedom Flights program remained popular, and long waiting lists forced Cuban citizens to seek other methods of emigration. Freedom Flight immigrant Orlando Torres signed up in 1965, at the beginning of the program, but needed to wait two years to leave. The popularity of the program resulted in a long waiting list that often made Cubans wait and suffer in humiliation and harassment for years before they finally left. By September 1970, Cubans grew desperate as wait times grew longer, and some tried to emigrate through the "corridor of death," the Florida Straits.

This emigration effectively became a "brain drain" of Cuba's human capital, as the professionals needed to sustain Cuba's economy relocated to the United States. The effects were so severe that Castro repeatedly complained about them, and in May 1969, as the economic effects intensified, Castro stopped accepting applications for exit visas. The effects also caused Castro to suspend the program from May to December 1972, and on April 6, 1973, the last Freedom Flight touched down at Miami International Airport.

== Aftermath ==
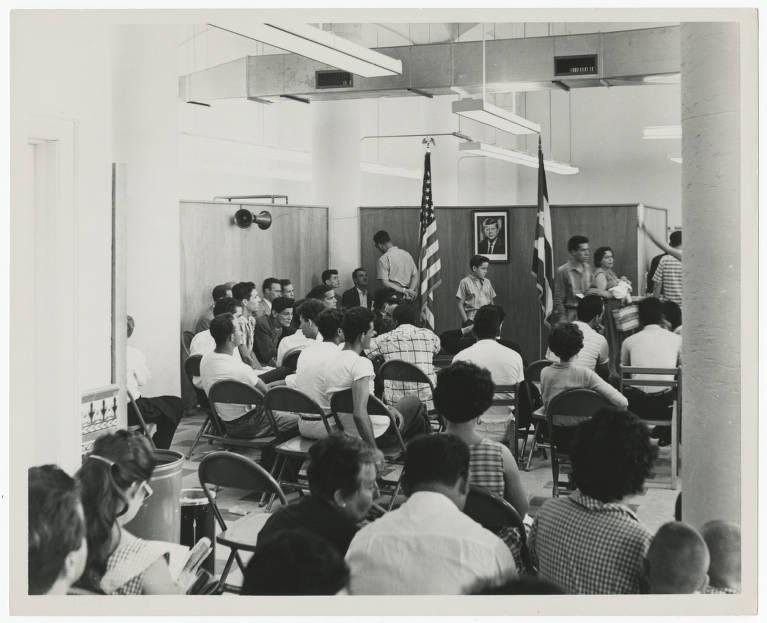
Busy waiting room of Cuban refugees in the Freedom Tower.

=== Processing ===
When the Cuban-Americans arrived in Miami, they were processed at the Freedom Tower (la Torre de la Libertad), which came to be known as the "Ellis Island of the South." Today, it is a National Historic Landmark and a cultural education center, a testament to the important role it once served.

The immigrants affectionately called the Freedom Tower "el refugio" ("the refuge") and temporarily lived in "Casas de la libertad" ("Houses of Liberty") set up at Miami International Airport. The Freedom Flights program itself also explicitly references freedom. The important early landmarks and the program itself thus served as sanctuary and represented explicit connections to freedom and liberty.

=== American backlash ===
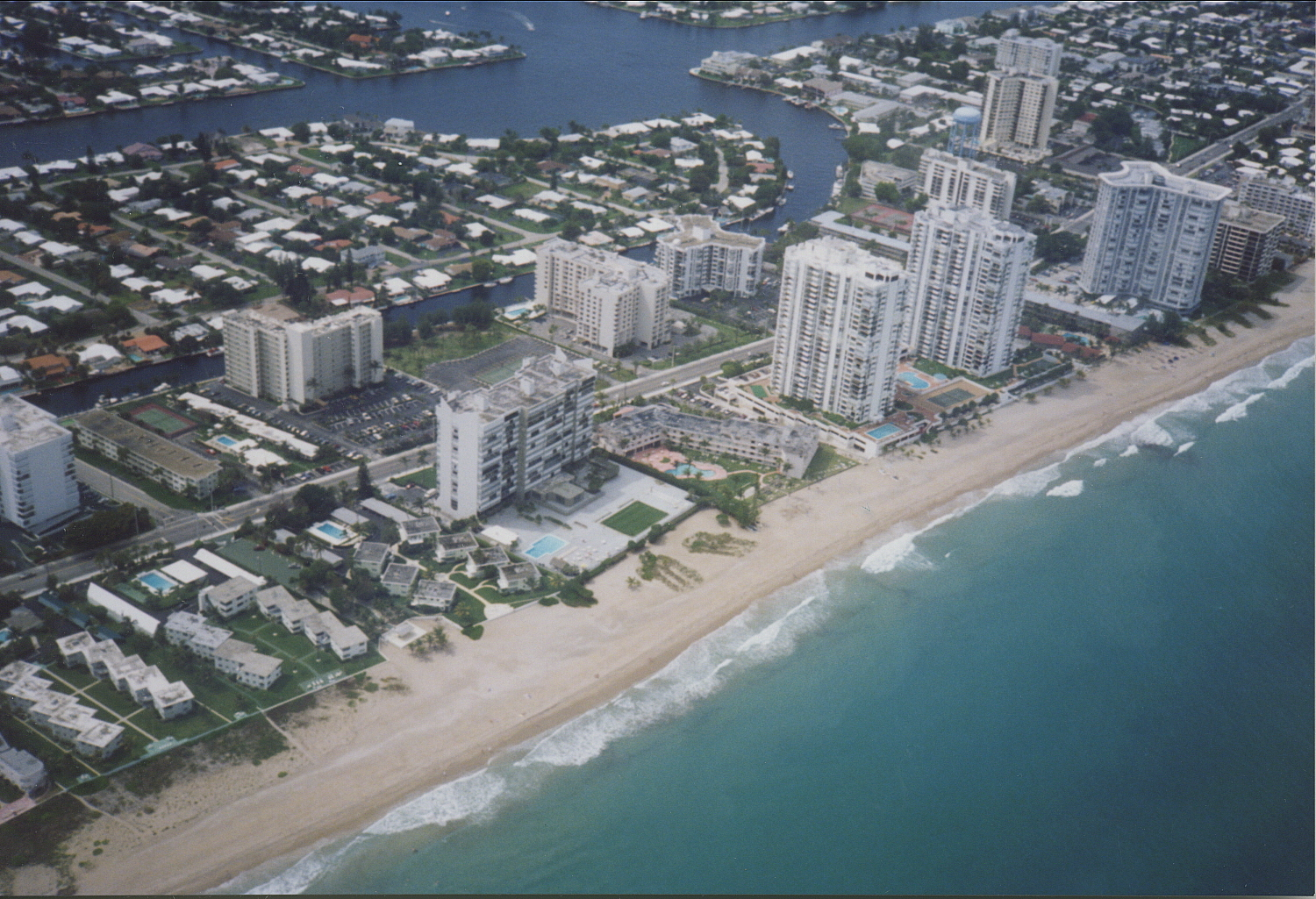
View of the Fort Lauderdale, 1980. This was the city many resentful Anglo-Americans relocated to avoid Miami's Cuban immigrants.

As the community settled in, it faced intense discrimination and a difficult language barrier. Immigrant Luis Botifoll notes, "Some resented us because we spoke Spanish, we would talk too loud, and took jobs away from them." He recalls signs that read, "No Pets, No Children, and No Cubans." Letters to the editor of Miami newspapers complained that Cubans "were sacrificing our welfare and security." A popular bumper sticker lamented, "Will the Last American Leaving Miami Please Bring the Flag." The Freedom Flight Cubans also faced a language barrier. Dade County's official language was English until 1973, so all official documents were produced only in English. Without an established Cuban-American base, the early immigrants were thrust into a discriminatory culture with a foreign language, impeding their development.

Many white Americans in Miami Dade County began moving north into Broward County in response to the influx of Cuban immigrants. American Jews also started moving north into Broward and Palm Beach County. Places in Miami-Dade like the Hialeah neighborhood were almost entirely populated by Anglo-Americans in 1960 but decades later would be 96% Hispanic. This growing demographic trend caused resentful white Americans to pick Fort Lauderdale as their new home, a city with a 4% Hispanic population in 1980.

=== Cuban-American culture and politics ===
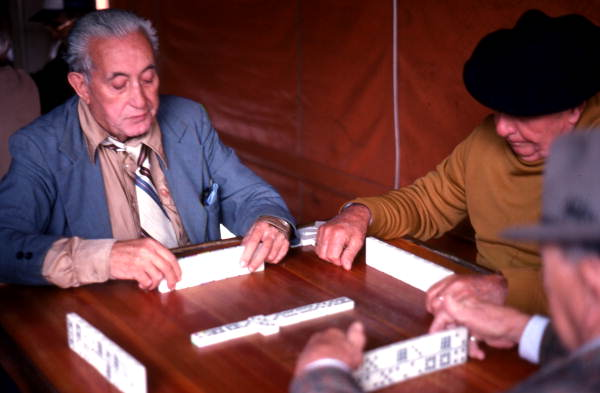
Cuban men playing dominoes in Little Havana, circa 1975

Initially, the Cuban-American immigrants and the United States government saw the immigration as temporary, that the immigrants would promptly return to Cuba after Castro lost power. Luis Botifoll recalls, "All we had in mind was to return to Cuba.... Nobody wanted to commit themselves to a job. We all lived day-to-day." President Johnson was confident the Cubans could eventually return: "the tides of history run strong, and in another day, the Cubans can return to their homeland to find it cleansed of terror and free from fear."

To that end, both the Cuban-American community and the United States government worked to undermine Castro's rule. The head of the Bacardi empire in the mid-1960s, Pepín Bosch, helped organize anti-Castro propaganda and paramilitary operations. A famous anti-Castro group, Alpha 66, still exists today. By the middle of the Freedom Flights, in the late 1960s, small armed parties sparked guerilla warfare in Cuba.

Freedom Flight Cubans resisted but still experienced an "Americanization" of their culture. Immigrant Angel Perdomo notes, "I try to stay a Cuban, but the Americanization is in me." The Cuban-American thus drew a distinction between "Cuban" and "American;" connecting the two with a hyphen did not imply they became the same. Many Cuban-Americans resisted the second part of their label, trying to preserve the culture of their homeland in its most pristine form.

Even while Cubans resisted "Americanization" and preserved their traditional culture, they "Cubanized" American culture. In 1973, Miami's Dade County officially became bilingual. Classic Cuban musician Benny Moré blasted from radio sets, Cuban bodegas replaced American supermarkets, and men donned guayaberas for any occasion. Additionally, private schools focused on Cuba's history and culture, ensuring that younger generations would appreciate their heritage.

=== Formation of Little Havana ===
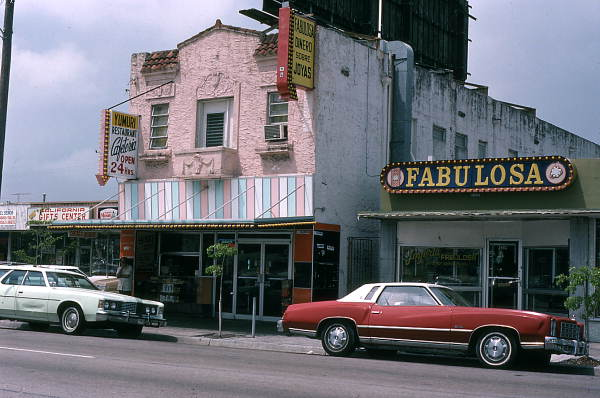
Mom and Pop stores in Little Havana, circa 1978

The Freedom Flights solidified the formation of Little Havana, an area of 4 square miles (10 km^{2}) densely populated by Cuban immigrants that preserves an authentic Cuban culture. A distinct subculture, Little Havana provides space for Cuban immigrants to congregate and reproduce life as it used to be. Contemporary newspaper articles attribute Little Havana with a distinct Cuban feel. Freedom Flight Cubans congregated in Little Havana, seeking to celebrate their culture, solidifying its formation.

Little Havana was a concentrated microcosm of the greater South Florida Cuban-American community, an "enclave" secured by the Freedom Flights that facilitated Cuban-American growth. The enclave, a self-contained economic sphere of self-promoting Cuban influence (Cubans employed and bought from other Cubans, stimulating economic growth), was begun by the first wave of post-Castro Cuban refugees in the early 1960s but solidified by the Freedom Flight Cubans of the late 1960s. The enclave accelerated the growth of Cuban-American economic and political clout. Elaine Condon remarks, "Their overwhelming success, in the span of one generation, has been virtually unprecedented in American history." By securing the enclave, the Freedom Flight Cubans provided a community that would facilitate the early lives of most exiles. Cuban-American immigration expert and sociology professor Juan Clark observes that "the [Freedom Flight Cubans] turned Miami into the epicenter for all Cuban exiles."

== See also ==
- Cuba–United States relations
