= Balseros =

Illegal emigrants from Cuba floating in rafts to neighboring countries

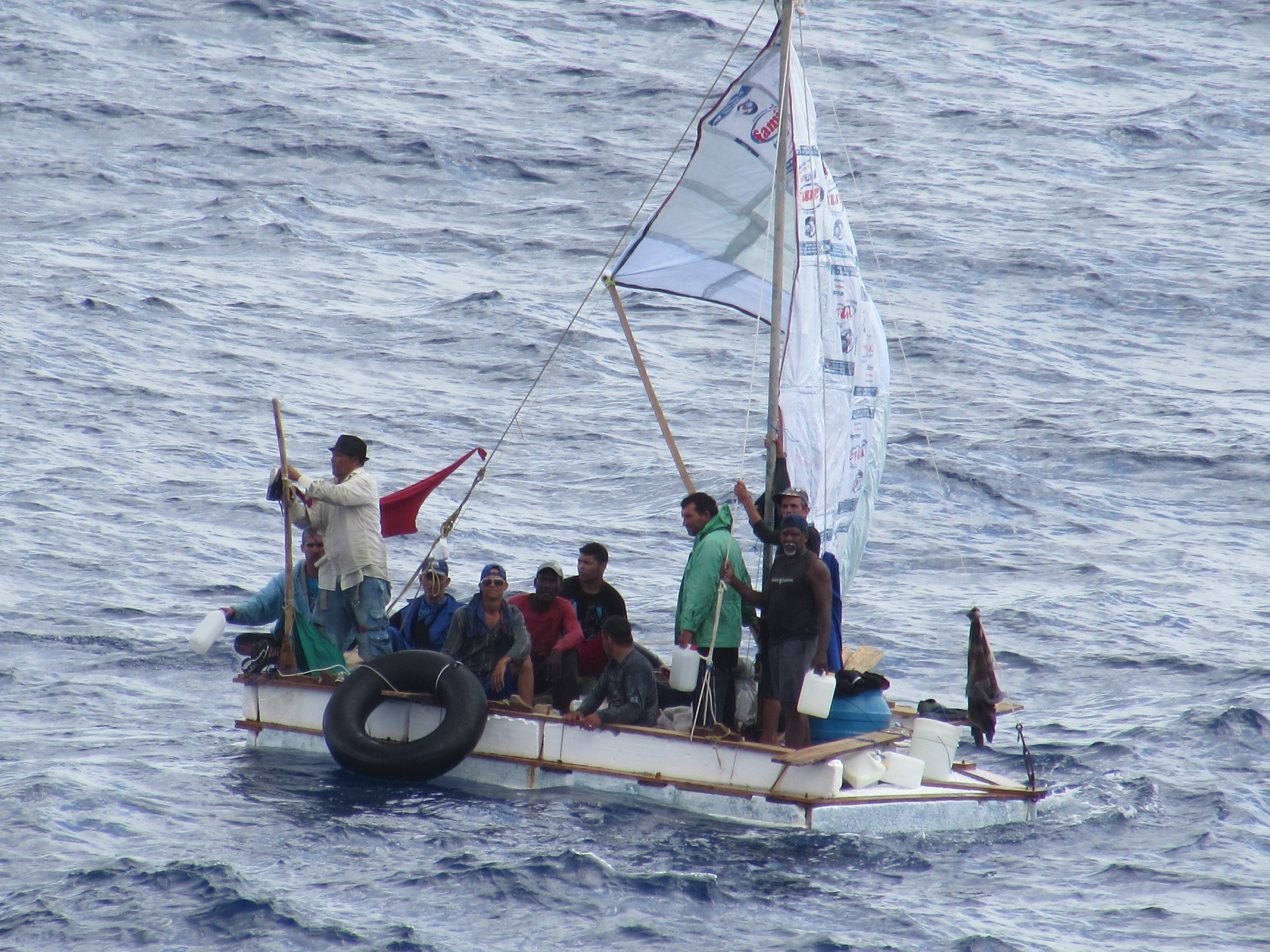
Balseros spotted and rescued by the Carnival Liberty in 2014

Balseros ('rafters', from Spanish balsa 'raft') were boat people who emigrated without formal documentation in self constructed or precarious vessels from Cuba to neighboring states including The Bahamas, Jamaica, the Cayman Islands and, most commonly, the United States since the 1994 Balsero crisis and during the wet feet, dry feet policy.

== History ==
=== 1994 Cuban rafter crisis ===
The August 1994 Cuban rafter crisis was the fourth wave of Cuban immigration following Castro's rise to power. The 1994 Balseros Crisis was ended by the agreement of the wet feet, dry feet policy between Bill Clinton and Fidel Castro.

=== Wet feet, dry feet policy ===
After 1994, balseros continued to arrive in the United States from Cuba. In the 2015 fiscal year, 4,473 balseros attempted to come to the United States. In fiscal year 2016, the number was 7,411. In January 2017, the wet feet, dry feet policy came to an end, and now any balsero can be subject to deportation. Shortly before the policy ended, the U.S. Coast Guard noticed a spike in balseros attempting to reach the United States.

=== After 2017 ===
Since the end of the wet feet, dry feet policy in 2017, fewer balseros attempted to make the journey to the United States. Some still continue to come with less legal support. If they manage to arrive in Florida the only legal way to remain is to apply for political asylum.

== Emigration ==
Often the boats created are unsafe, and utilize engines not often used for boats such as lawnmower engines. Of people who choose to emigrate this way, some are captured by Cuban authorities, others arrive safely outside Cuba, some are intercepted by United States authorities and given medical care, then returned to Cuba, while others may be lost at sea and their deaths unknown and unreported.

== Deaths ==
It is estimated that 16,000 to 100,000 Balseros perished at sea in their flight from Cuba. Any failed attempt to cross the sea by raft can end in drowning. The advent of mobile phones, with GPS, and those that use satellite connection, has increased the chance survival, because they allow users to call through a satellite to ask for help, even when at sea far from the coast.

== See also ==
- Balseros – the title of a 2002 documentary about those persons and their experiences in Cuba and in the United States
- Cuban boat people
- Marielitos
