= 1994 Cuban rafter crisis =

Mass Cuban emigration

- Part of the Cuban exodus
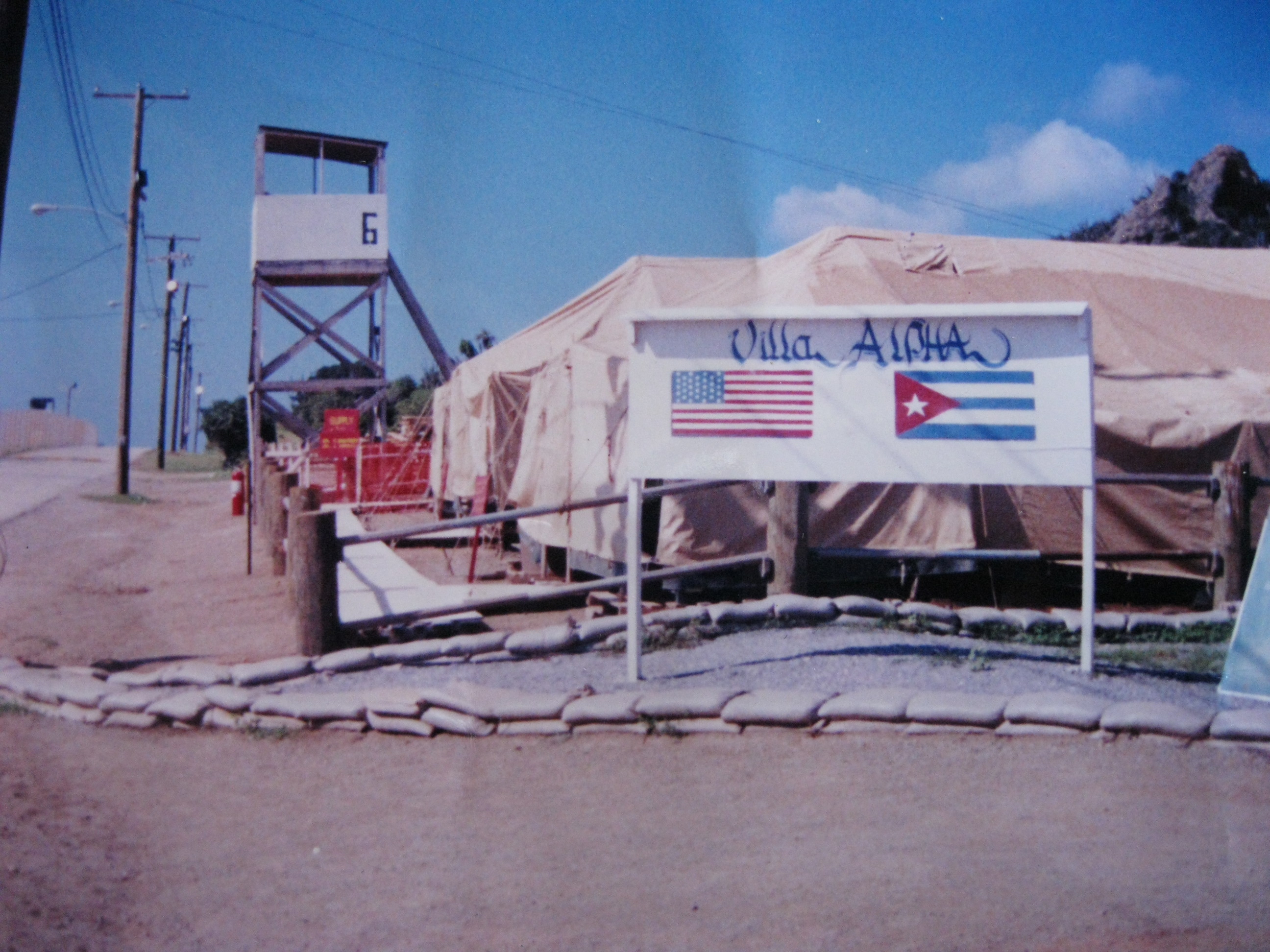
- Housing for refugees at Guantanamo Bay
- Date: 15 April – 31 October 1994 (5 months, 2 weeks and 2 days)
- Participants: Government of Cuba; Government of the United States; Balseros
- Outcome: Around 35,000 Cubans arrive in the United States

The 1994 Cuban rafter crisis which is also known as the 1994 Cuban raft exodus or the Balsero crisis was the emigration of more than 35,000 Cubans to the United States (via makeshift rafts). The exodus occurred over five weeks following rioting in Cuba; Fidel Castro announced in response that anyone who wished to leave the country could do so without any hindrance. Fearing a major exodus, the Clinton administration would mandate that all rafters captured at sea be detained at the Guantanamo Bay Naval Base.

== History ==
=== Background ===
After the dissolution of the Soviet Union and the beginning of the Special Period in Cuba, the United States Coast Guard noticed an increase in Cuban refugees, with 3,676 intercepted in 1993.

=== Exodus and detention ===
In the summer of 1994, several Cubans began breaking into consulates and the homes of ambassadors as well as hijacking boats in hopes of leaving the country. After the Maleconazo riots, Fidel Castro announced that any Cubans who wished to leave the island could. Around 5,000 rafters had left earlier in the year but after the announcement around 33,000 rafters left the island. U.S. President Bill Clinton would announce that any rafters intercepted at sea would be detained at Guantanamo Bay Naval Base. Around 20,000 rafters would be detained at the base. The Cubans held at the base were designated to live in a tent city. Many at the Naval base were concerned they would be sent back to Cuba instead of being granted permission to enter the United States. A legal battle began over the status of the Cuban refugees and the Haitian refugees who accompanied them at the Guantanamo Naval Base. Many Cuban detainees would try to become productive while waiting idle and uncertain of their futures. Some detainees constructed makeshift gyms, art galleries, newspapers, radio station, and held poetry readings. On May 2, 1995, the Clinton administration announced that most detainees would be processed and allowed to immigrate.

=== Policy change ===
In response to the crisis Bill Clinton enacted the Wet feet, dry feet policy where only Cuban rafters who made it to U.S. soil would be allowed to remain. The U.S. would also approve a minimum of 20,000 immigration visas a year for Cubans.

== See also ==
- Mariel boatlift
