= Jorge Duany =

Cuban-born Latin American cultural anthropologist

Jorge Duany is a theorist on Caribbean transnational migration and nationalism. Between 2012 and 2024, he was director of the Cuban Research Institute and professor of anthropology at Florida International University, and has held various teaching positions across the United States and Puerto Rico. His research focuses on concepts of nationalism, ethnicity, race, transnationalism, and migration within the Spanish Caribbean and between the Spanish Caribbean and the United States, particularly regarding Cuba and Puerto Rico.

== Biography ==
=== Early life and education ===
Duany was born in Havana, Cuba, in 1957, but at an early age moved to Panama and eventually to Puerto Rico, where he grew up. He attended university in the United States, obtaining a bachelor's degree in psychology at Columbia University in 1978 and a master's degree in social sciences from the University of Chicago in 1979. He earned his PhD in Latin American studies at the University of California, Berkeley, with a specialization in anthropology, in 1985. He considers that his experience moving from Cuba to Puerto Rico and the United States made him more qualified for the study of transnational migration and comparison of the experiences of Caribbean peoples.

=== Career ===
His college teaching career started in 1980 at the University of the Sacred Heart in Santurce, Puerto Rico, where he taught anthropology, psychology, and social sciences. He also served as teaching assistant for various years at the University of California, Berkeley and later as professor at the University of Puerto Rico, Río Piedras, among others. He has served on various editorial boards of academic journals such as Caribbean Studies, Cuban Studies, Latino Studies, and Latin American and Caribbean Ethnic Studies.

== Theoretical Contributions ==
=== On Puerto Rican Identity ===
Duany's most popular and most cited work is his research on Puerto Rican transnational migration and diaspora relations. Michael R. Hall notes Duany's research is at the intersection of three major research themes of recent Puerto Rican studies: the fall of political nationalism, the rise of cultural nationalism, and the migration of Puerto Ricans between Puerto Rico and the United States. One of Duany's most often noted contributions to theorization on Puerto Rican self-identity and migratory history is the inclusion of other migratory waves outside of Nuyoricans, like the Popular Democratic Party's contract farm labor programs in the 1950s and the more recent wave of middle-class Puerto Ricans to Orlando. Another important contribution to note is his positive stance and insistence on the Nuyorican community and Puerto Ricans in the US as being both part of and beneficial to the Puerto Rican cultural identity. Thus, he coined the expression "nation on the move" to describe the constant flow of people, ideas, and cultural practices between Puerto Rico and the U.S. mainland.

=== On Cuban and Dominican Identity and Diasporic Thought ===
Duany writes about Cuban diasporic identity as one seeking symbolic ties to the homeland, as a majority of the Cuban exiles are opposed to the current political situation of the island. He notes Cubans in Miami often use their Catholicism as a way to deal with their displacement and emotional ties to the island, as a replacement for the disconnect in the political and social realities of Castro's Cuba.

He notes that in the Dominican Republic, the ties between the homeland and the diaspora are much more important politically and economically. Major political contenders frequently depend upon funding and organizational support from Dominican Americans, going as far as to promote dual nationality. Transnationalism in the Dominican Republic thus plays a major role in Dominican political and economic issues on the island and abroad, and migrants are much more connected and valued in the island’s politics in comparison to Cuba and Puerto Rico.

== Selected works ==
- Cobas, José A., and Jorge Duany. Cubans in Puerto Rico: Ethnic Economy and Cultural Identity. Univ Press of Florida, 1997.
- Cobas, José A., Jorge Duany, and Joe R. Feagin, eds. How the United States Racializes Latinos: White Hegemony and Its Consequences. Routledge, 2016.
- Duany, Jorge. Blurred Borders: Transnational Migration between the Hispanic Caribbean and the United States. Univ of North Carolina Press, 2011.
- Duany, Jorge. "Nation on the Move: The Construction of Cultural Identities in Puerto Rico and the Diaspora." American Ethnologist 27, no. 1 (2000): 5-30.
- Duany, Jorge. Obra selecta. Aduana Vieja, 2021.
- Duany, Jorge. Puerto Rico: What Everyone Needs to Know. 2nd ed. Oxford Univ Press, 2024.
- Duany, Jorge. The Puerto Rican Nation on the Move: Identities on the Island and in the United States. Univ of North Carolina Press, 2002.
- Duany, Jorge. Quisqueya on the Hudson: The Transnational Identity of Dominicans in Washington Heights. Dominican Studies Institute, City Univ of New York, 2008.
- Duany, Jorge. "Reconstructing Racial Identity: Ethnicity, Color, and Class among Dominicans in the United States and Puerto Rico." Latin American Perspectives 25, no. 3 (1998): 147-72.
- Duany, Jorge. "The Rough Edges of Puerto Rican Identities: Race, Gender, and Transnationalism." Latin American Research Review 40, no. 3 (2005): 177-90.
- Duany, Jorge, ed. Picturing Cuba: Art, Culture, and Identity on the Island and in the Diaspora. Univ of Florida Press, 2019.
- Rivera, Carmen Haydée, and Jorge Duany, eds. Cuba and Puerto Rico: Transdisciplinary Approaches to History, Literature, and Culture. Univ. of Florida Press, 2023.

== See also ==
- Stateside Puerto Ricans
- Culture of Puerto Rico
- Migration studies
- Neocolonialism
- Nationalism studies
- Cuban immigration to the United States
