= Wet feet, dry feet policy =

US policy on Cuban migrants between 1995 and 2017

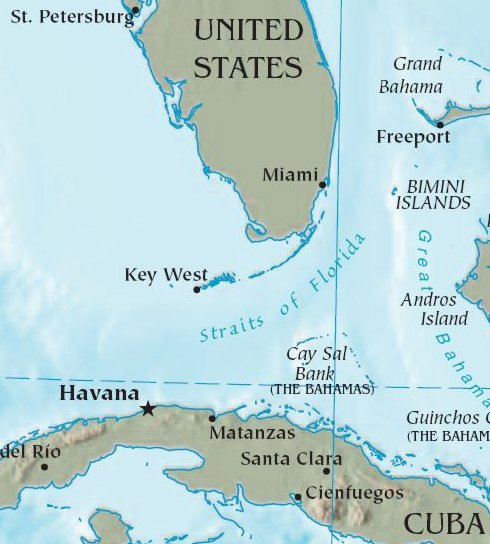
Cuba is 90 miles (145 kilometers) south of Florida

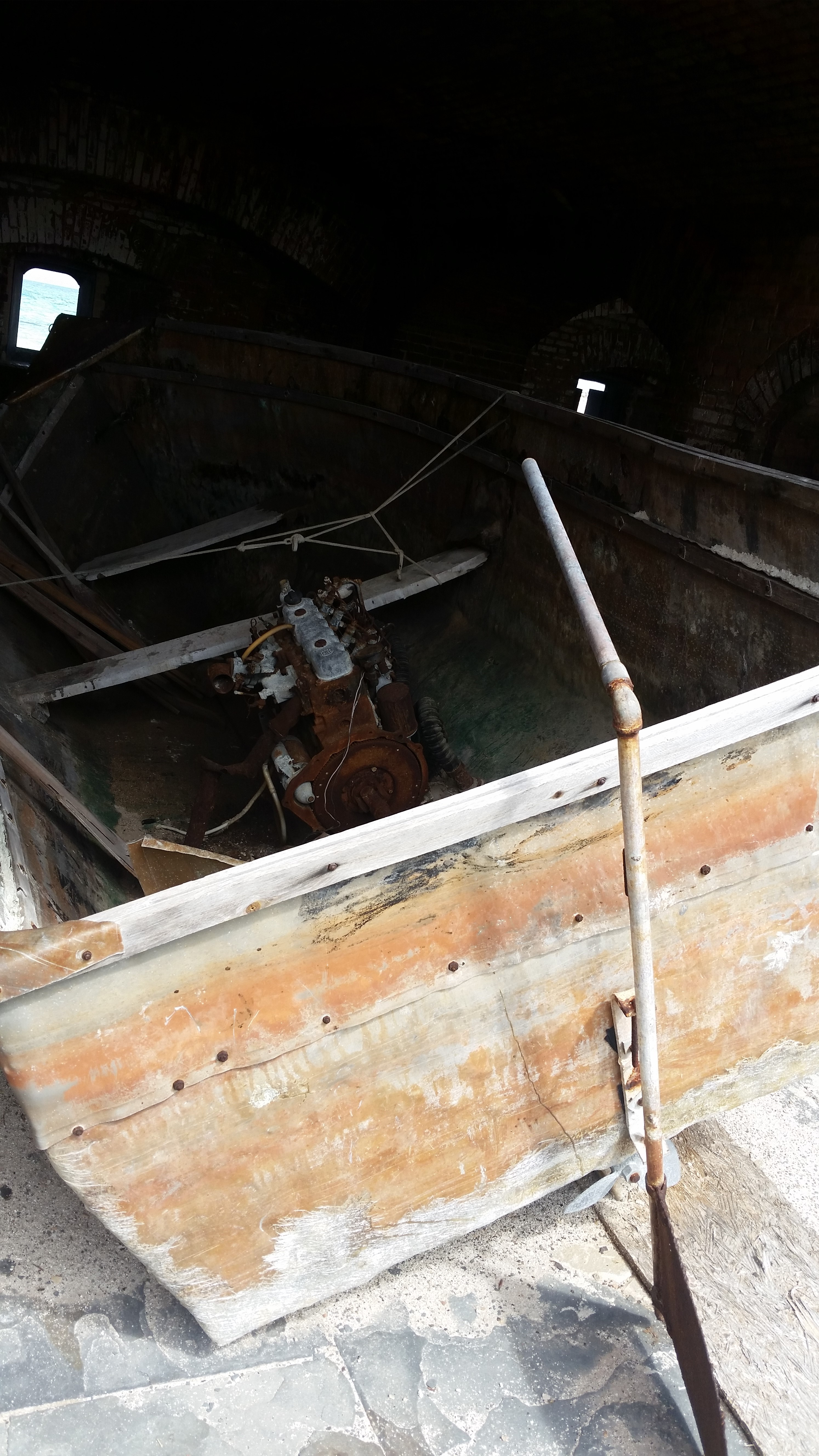
The stern of a Cuban "chug" (homemade boat used by refugees) on display at Fort Jefferson, Florida

The wet feet, dry feet policy or wet foot, dry foot policy is a 1995 interpretation, followed until 2017, of the United States Cuban Adjustment Act of 1966. The original Act directs that anyone who emigrated from Cuba and entered the United States would be allowed to pursue residency a year later; prior to 1995, the U.S. government allowed all Cubans who reached U.S. territorial waters to remain in the U.S. After talks with the Cuban government, the Clinton administration came to an agreement with Cuba that it would stop admitting people intercepted in U.S. waters.

Under this 1995 interpretation, a Cuban caught on the waters between the two nations (having "wet feet") would summarily be returned to Cuba or sent to a third country, while one who made it to shore ("dry feet") got a chance to remain in the United States, and later would qualify for expedited "legal permanent resident" status in accordance with the 1967 Act, and eventually for U.S. citizenship. However, the policy came with increased risk for asylum seekers entering the country. In 1994, also known as the year of the Rafter Crisis, 36,900 Cuban emigrants risked travel by sea.

On January 12, 2017, Barack Obama announced the immediate end of the policy, saying, "Cuban nationals who attempt to enter the United States illegally and do not qualify for humanitarian relief will be subject to removal." The last months of his presidency saw a strengthening in foreign relations with Cuba, including bilateral agreements with the Cuban government regarding maritime and aeronautical search and rescue protocols for Cuban immigrants entering the country.

== Background ==
Between 1960 and 1980, hundreds of thousands of Cubans entered the United States under the Attorney General's parole authority, many of them arriving by boat. In 1980, a mass migration of asylum seekers—known as the Mariel boatlift—brought approximately 125,000 Cubans (and 25,000 Haitians) to South Florida over a six-month period. After declining for several years, Cuban "boat people" steadily rose from a few hundred in 1989 to a few thousand in 1993 after the fall of the Soviet Union and its support for Cuba. In August 1994, the most serious anti-Castro demonstration in Cuban history occurred in Havana, as 200 to 300 young men began throwing stones at police, demanding that they be allowed to emigrate to Miami, and the Cuban exodus by boat escalated. The number of Cubans intercepted by the U.S. Coast Guard or the U.S. Border Patrol reached a post-Mariel high of 37,191 in 1994.

Until 1995, the United States generally had not repatriated Cubans (except certain criminal immigrants on a negotiated list) under a policy established when the government became Communist within two years of the 1959 Cuban Revolution. Not only was the United States historically reluctant to repatriate people to Cuba, but the Cuban government typically refused to accept Cuban migrants who were excludable under the Immigration and Nationality Act (INA). (Cubans who have been convicted of crimes in the United States pose complex problems, as Cuba is among a handful of nations that does not generally accept the return of criminal aliens.)

"Normalizing" migration between the two nations was the stated purpose of the migration agreement enacted by the Clinton administration on September 9, 1994, when the U.S. policy toward Cuban immigrants was altered significantly. The plan's objectives of safe, legal, and orderly immigration relied on six points.

- The United States agreed no longer to permit Cubans intercepted at sea to come to the United States; rather, Cubans would be placed in a safe haven camp in a third location. Justifying this policy as a "safety of life at sea" issue, Cuba also agreed to use "persuasive methods" to discourage people from setting sail.
- The U.S. and Cuba reaffirmed their support for the United Nations General Assembly resolution on alien smuggling. They pledged to cooperate in the prevention of the illegal transport of migrants and the use of violence or "forcible divergence" to reach the United States.
- The U.S. agreed to admit no fewer than 20,000 immigrants from Cuba annually, not including the immediate relatives of U.S. citizens.
- The U.S. and Cuba agreed to cooperate on the voluntary return of Cubans who arrived in the U.S. or were intercepted at sea.
- The U.S. and Cuba did not reach an agreement on how to handle Cubans who were excluded by the INA, but agreed to continue discussing the matter. (Grounds for removal included health-related grounds; criminal grounds; national security grounds; Nazi prosecution grounds; public charge grounds; illegal entry and immigration law violations; and lack of proper immigration documents.)
- The U.S. and Cuba agreed to review the implementation of this agreement and engage in further discussions.

It became apparent that the 20,000 minimum level per year could not be met through the INA preference system or the refugee provisions because of the eligibility criteria. In addition to Cubans who may qualify to immigrate through the INA preference system and who may qualify as refugees, the United States decided to use other authority in the law (i.e., parole), to allow Cubans to come to the U.S. and become legal permanent residents through the Cuban Adjustment Act. Specifically, a "visa lottery" program was established to randomly select who, among the many Cubans seeking to migrate, receives a visa.

As part of the effort to enact this agreement, Operations Safe Haven and Safe Passage were executed to alleviate overcrowding at Guantanamo Bay by using temporary camps in Panama.

=== Cuban Migration Agreement ===
On May 1, 1995, the Clinton administration announced a further agreement with Cuba that resolved the dilemma of the approximately 33,000 Cubans then encamped at Guantanamo. This new agreement, which came at the time of year when boat people traditionally begin their journeys, had two new points. Foremost, the U.S. allowed most of the Cubans detained at Guantanamo to come to the U.S. through the humanitarian parole provisions of the INA. Cuba agreed to credit some of these admissions toward the minimum 20,000 LPRs per year from Cuba, with 5,000 charged annually over three years.

Secondly, rather than placing Cubans intercepted at sea in safe haven camps, the U.S. began repatriating them to Cuba (the "wet feet, dry feet policy"). Both parties promised to act in a matter consistent with international obligations and to ensure that no action is taken against those repatriated. U.S. officials would inform repatriated Cubans about procedures to legally immigrate at the United States Interests Section in Havana. Those charged with alien smuggling, however, faced prison terms in Cuba.

Interdicted Cubans were given an opportunity to express a fear of persecution if returned to Cuba. Those who meet the definition of a refugee or asylee were resettled in a third country. From May 1995 through July 2003, about 170 Cuban refugees were resettled in 11 countries, including Spain, Venezuela, Australia, and Nicaragua. The State Department was required to monitor whether those migrants returned to Cuba were subject to reprisals.

=== Special Cuban Migration Program lottery ===
As a result of the 1994 migration agreement, the U.S. conducted three visa lottery open seasons to implement the Special Cuban Migration Program. The three open seasons were at two-year intervals: Fiscal Year (FY) 1994, FY1996, and FY1998. The number of qualifying registrants increased each year, from 189,000 in 1994 to 433,000 in 1996 and to 541,000 in 1998.

Once selected through the lottery, the successful applicants were given parole status with a visa good for six months. Over the years, there have been reports of barriers the potential Cuban parolees face, such as exorbitantly-priced medical exams, exit visas fees, and repercussions for family members who are sequestered.

== Recurring issues and criticism ==
A well-publicized incident in June 1999 provoked outrage when the U.S. Coast Guard used pepper spray and a water cannon to prevent six Cubans from reaching Surfside Beach in Florida. A few weeks later, a Cuban woman drowned when a boat capsized during interdiction. In another notable incident in late November 1999, the U.S. Coast Guard opted to bring six-year-old Elián González and two other survivors of an ill-fated journey to the United States rather than taking them to Cuba as the migration agreement provides.

In July 2003, a dozen people reportedly stole a Cuban-flagged boat from the marina where it was docked in Cuba and kidnapped the three watchmen guarding the marina in the process. When the boat was in international waters allegedly en route to Florida, Coast Guard officials tried to intercept it and reportedly faced violent resistance from the Cubans when they interdicted the vessel. All 15 persons on board were taken to the U.S. Coast Guard cutter and interviewed by a USCIS asylum officer. The three watchmen indicated a desire to return to Cuba. When the Cuban government offered to sentence the 12 persons implicated in crimes (purportedly boat theft, kidnapping, and assaulting federal officers) to 10 years in prison, the U.S. agreed to return them.

On January 7, 2006, the Coast Guard found 15 Cubans who had climbed onto a piling on the old Seven Mile Bridge in the Florida Keys. The old bridge had been cut off from land because it was no longer in use and the U.S. Coast Guard argued that since the refugees could not walk to land, their feet were still "wet". The Coast Guard's legal office, in conjunction with Immigration and Customs Enforcement, decided to repatriate the Cubans. The Coast Guard stated that the Cubans "were determined to be wet-feet and processed in accordance with standard procedure."

In retaliation to the Cubans being returned, Ramón Saúl Sánchez led a hunger strike against the policy, and on January 18, the White House agreed to meet with Sánchez at some point in the near future. After eleven days, the hunger strike was ended, but Sánchez was not allowed to meet with White House officials. On February 28, 2007, a federal judge ruled that the U.S. government had acted unreasonably when it sent home the 15 Cubans. The judge ordered the government to make its best effort to help the immigrants return to the U.S.. Fourteen of the 15 Cubans re-landed on December 15, 2006, and were given migrant visas.

== Changes in immigration patterns ==
Since the late-1980s, immigration patterns changed. Many Cuban immigrants departed from the southern and western coasts of Cuba and arrived at the Yucatán Peninsula in Mexico; many landed on Isla Mujeres. From there Cuban immigrants traveled to the Texas–Mexico border and found asylum. Many of the Cubans who did not have family in Miami settled in Houston. The term "dusty foot" refers to Cubans immigrating to the U.S. through Mexico.

Other migrants arrived in the U.S. crossing the Mona Channel that separates the Dominican Republic from Puerto Rico, the latter being a U.S. territory. Using smugglers based in the Dominican Republic, migrants made the hazardous journey using rickety fishing boats commonly called "yolas" and set foot on Isla de Mona, a small uninhabited island that is part of Puerto Rico. Once on the island, U.S. Coast Guard patrol boats picked up the migrants and transferred them to Aguadilla where they were processed by U.S. immigration.

== End of policy ==
Beginning with the United States–Cuban Thaw in 2014, anticipation of the end of the wet feet, dry feet policy led to increased numbers of Cuban immigrants. On January 12, 2017, President Barack Obama announced the immediate cessation of the wet feet, dry feet policy. Since then, Cuban nationals who enter the United States illegally, regardless of whether they are intercepted on land or at sea, have been subject to removal. At the same time the Cuban government agreed to accept the return of Cuban nationals.

== See also ==
- Cuba–United States relations
- Touch Base Policy (Hong Kong)
