= Unforgettable season 4 =

Season of television series

Unforgettable
- Season 4
- DVD cover
- No. of episodes: 13

Release
- Original network: A&E
- Original release: November 27, 2015 – January 22, 2016

Season chronology
- ← Previous; Season 3

The fourth and final season of Unforgettable an American police procedural drama television series originally aired on A&E from November 27, 2015, through January 22, 2016.

== Cast and characters ==
=== Main ===
- Poppy Montgomery as Det. Carrie Wells
- Dylan Walsh as Lt. Al Burns
- James Hiroyuki Liao as Det. Jay Lee
- E. J. Bonilla as Det. Denny Padilla
- Alani Anthony as Dr. Delina Michaels
- Kathy Najimy as Capt. Sandra Russo

=== Recurring ===
- Dallas Roberts as Eliot Delson
- Skeet Ulrich as Det. Eddie Martin

== Episodes ==
| No. overall | No. in season | Title | Directed by | Written by | Original release date | U.S. viewers (millions) |
|---|---|---|---|---|---|---|
| 49 | 1 | "Blast from the Past" | Matt Earl Beesley | Teleplay by : Bill Chais; Story by : Ed Redlich & John Bellucci | November 27, 2015 | 0.84 |
Detective Eddie Martin, Carrie's estranged husband, arrives from Long Beach to assist in Major Crimes' manhunt for meth dealers who seem to have stepped up their game. E.J. Bonilla and La La Anthony join the cast as new detective Denny Padilla and new medical examiner Delinda Michaels.
| 50 | 2 | "Gut Check" | Jace Alexander | Spencer Hudnut | November 27, 2015 | 0.71 |
Carrie and Al drive the star witness in a high-profile fraud case to Miami, enduring her eccentricities while dodging hitmen out to silence her. At the end of the episode, Eliot leaves the Major Crimes Division after receiving a promotion.
| 51 | 3 | "Behind The Beat" | Matt Earl Beesley | Karen Campbell | December 4, 2015 | 0.92 |
When a young jazz prodigy is found murdered, the investigation leads to the underbelly of the world of jazz.
| 52 | 4 | "Dollars and Scents" | Paul Holahan | Timothy J. Lea | December 11, 2015 | 0.94 |
Carrie goes undercover to solve the murders of a deli worker and computer hacker, which might be connected to the past of a French securities dealer. Kathy Najimy joins the cast as Major Crimes' new commander and Al's old commanding officer, Captain Sandra Russo.
| 53 | 5 | "All In" | Jean de Segonzac | Bill Chais & Spencer Hudnut | December 18, 2015 | 1.01 |
The murder of an architect sends Carrie and Al to Atlantic City, where they uncover a casino heist involving stolen blueprints and an old flame of Carrie's.
| 54 | 6 | "The Return of Eddie" | Paul Holahan | Emmy Grinwis | January 1, 2016 | 0.74 |
Carrie's ex-husband Eddie returns to New York just in time to assist in the murder investigation of a tabloid cameraman during a convenience store robbery.
| 55 | 8 | "We Can Be Heroes" | Laura Belsey | John P. Roche | January 8, 2016 | 0.61 |
Major Crimes takes the case of the kidnapping of a prominent scientist's son, and uncovers a long-standing plot of revenge.
| 56 | 9 | "Breathing Space" | Oz Scott | Louisa Hill | January 15, 2016 | 0.71 |
The team investigates the murder of an aerospace engineer and suspect it is tied to a secret project she was a part of.
| 57 | 10 | "Shelter from the Storm" | Andy Wolk | Timothy J. Lea & Karen Campbell | January 15, 2016 | 0.65 |
Carrie and Al arrest a mobster and his accountant for the murder of a teenage girl at the same time a hurricane hits the coast. With all communications down due to the storm, they are forced take shelter at a largely vacated precinct undergoing renovation, and fend off the mobster's goons who are determined to extract their boss by any means necessary.
| 58 | 11 | "Game On" | Kate Woods | Jeff Pfeiffer | January 22, 2016 | 0.84 |
Carrie and Al investigate the death of a young gamer in a haunted house, and uncover a plot of hi-tech corporate espionage and high stakes video gaming.
| 59 | 7 | "About Face" | David Platt | Jacob Copithorne | January 22, 2016 | 0.66 |
The team's search for a missing plastic surgeon uncovers a plot by a pair of con-artists looking to sell a stolen bio-weapon.
| 60 | 12 | "Bad Company" | Jamie Sheridan | Bill Chais | January 22, 2016 | 0.55 |
At around the same time an old colleague of Al's is murdered, an old enemy of his and Russo's is released from prison, bringing back old demons and putting both of their careers on the line.
| 61 | 13 | "Paranoid Android" | Matt Earl Beesley | Spencer Hudnut | January 22, 2016 | 0.49 |
While investigating how a family man was seemingly "programmed" into a ruthless assassin, Carrie discovers that she herself may have fallen victim to the same scheme when a part of her memory is discovered to have been falsified. At the end, Al takes Carrie to an isolated park to propose to her, but he is shot by an unidentified sniper and Carrie desperately tries to keep him alive as the series ends in an unresolved cliffhanger.

== Production ==
=== Development ===
After being cancelled following three seasons by CBS, Unforgettable was picked up by A&E for a fourth season. Unforgettable was canceled after its fourth season on February 16, 2016.

=== Casting ===
In May 2015, it was announced that E.J. Bonilla, Alani Anthony, and Kathy Najimy joined as series regulars as Det. Denny Padilla, Dr. Delina Michaels, and Capt. Sandra Russo.

== Broadcast ==
Season four of Unforgettable premiered on November 27, 2015.

== Reception ==
=== Ratings ===
Viewership and ratings per episode of Unforgettable season 4
| No. | Title | Air date | Rating (18–49) | Viewers (millions) |
|---|---|---|---|---|
| 1 | "Blast from the Past" | November 27, 2015 | 0.1 | 0.84 |
| 2 | "Gut Check" | November 27, 2015 | 0.1 | 0.71 |
| 3 | "Behind The Beat" | December 4, 2015 | 0.1 | 0.92 |
| 4 | "Dollars and Scents" | December 11, 2015 | 0.2 | 0.94 |
| 5 | "All In" | December 18, 2015 | 0.1 | 1.01 |
| 6 | "The Return of Eddie" | January 1, 2016 | 0.1 | 0.74 |
| 7 | "We Can Be Heroes" | January 8, 2016 | 0.1 | 0.61 |
| 8 | "Breathing Space" | January 15, 2016 | 0.1 | 0.71 |
| 9 | "Shelter from the Storm" | January 15, 2016 | 0.1 | 0.65 |
| 10 | "Game On" | January 22, 2016 | 0.1 | 0.84 |
| 11 | "About Face" | January 22, 2016 | 0.1 | 0.66 |
| 12 | "Bad Company" | January 22, 2016 | 0.1 | 0.55 |
| 13 | "Paranoid Android" | January 22, 2016 | 0.1 | 0.49 |
