= Unforgettable season 2 =

Unforgettable
- Season 2
- DVD cover
- No. of episodes: 13

Release
- Original network: CBS
- Original release: July 28, 2013 – May 9, 2014

Season chronology
- ← Previous; Season 1 Next → Season 3

The second season of CBS American television drama series Unforgettable premiered on July 28, 2013, and has 13 episodes. The first seven episodes of the season were aired between this date, and September 8, 2013.

== Cast ==
=== Main cast ===
- Poppy Montgomery as Det. Carrie Wells (13 episodes)
- Dylan Walsh as Lt. Al Burns (13 episodes)
- Dallas Roberts as Eliot Delson (13 episodes)
- Jane Curtin as Dr. Joanne Webster (13 episodes)
- James Hiroyuki Liao as Det. Jay Lee (13 episodes)
- Tawny Cypress as Det. Cherie Rollins-Murray (13 episodes)

=== Recurring cast ===
- Stephen Kunken as Dale Parsons (2 episodes)
- Britt Lower as Tanya Sitkowsky (2 episodes)
- Adam Trese as Jay Krause (2 episodes)
- Sean Cullen as Gordon Frost (2 episodes)
- Makenzie Leigh as Celine Emminger (2 episodes)
- Emily Shaffer as Andrea Weston (2 episodes)

== Production ==
On May 13, 2012, CBS confirmed the cancellation of the series. A group of fans organized to try to save the series from cancellation. Their efforts included teaming up to create a campaign entitled "Save Unforgettable" and persuade other networks to pick up the series. TNT and Lifetime soon expressed interest in picking up the show before ultimately passing on the series. However, on June 29, 2012, CBS confirmed that Unforgettable would return for a second season in the summer of 2013 with an order for 13 episodes. The September 8 episode served as the summer finale, with the remainder of the season returning in January in Europe and on April 4, 2014 in the United States.

== Episodes ==
No. overall	No. in season	Title	Directed by	Written by	Original release date (Note: Season two episodes 8–13 were broadcast earlier in German speaking countries on Glitz* (Germany).)	U.S. viewers (millions)
23	1	"Bigtime"	Jean de Segonzac	Ed Redlich & John Bellucci	July 28, 2013	7.15
Carrie and Al's high conviction rate brings them to the attention of NYPD's Major Crime Division (MCD). They are requested by the MCD to investigate a high-profile kidnapping case in Manhattan. An 11-year-old girl, Lara, was kidnapped on her way to a soccer game. They think that it has been orchestrated by a group suspected in two previous high-profile kidnappings, one of which resulted in the hostage's death at the group's hands. The kidnapping of Lara also brings back memories of her murdered young sister to Carrie. Carrie and Al must race against time and save Lara as the group manages to stay one step ahead of them.
24	3	"Incognito"	Seith Mann	Spencer Hudnut	August 4, 2013	7.10
A team of robbers have been robbing high-end places in different cities. MCD gets a tip that they are about to hit a bank in New York. After capturing one member of the gang, Carrie goes undercover in her place. Carrie and MCD must now work together to nab the gang's leader, a notorious thief who never shows his face.
25	5	"Day of the Jackie"	Paul Holahan	Wendy Battles	August 11, 2013	6.88
A businessman is murdered in a high-class hotel. Carrie and Al are asked to investigate, but are unable to ascertain why he was murdered. Upon further investigation, they discover that his death was actually collateral damage in a larger plot to assassinate a diplomat by a dangerous group.
26	6	"Memory Kings"	Peter Werner	Sam Montgomery	August 18, 2013	6.57
Carrie and Al investigate the apparent suicide death of Eugene Lustig, a professor who was famous for his work on Terra Cognita, the new source of human memory. Lustig was the scientist who helped Carrie during her period of depression. She was part of a group who had the same skill as hers. She must now track them down in order to find the killer.
27	2	"Past Tense"	Matt Earl Beesley	Barry Schindel	August 25, 2013	6.80
When an Afghani cab driver is found murdered, Carrie and Al are brought in and informed that he was an informant helping the government in the surveillance and capture of terrorists. As the case escalates into a matter of national security, they must race against time to apprehend the real culprit before they execute an attack in New York City.
28	4	"Line Up or Shut Up"	Peter Werner	Quinton Peeples	September 1, 2013	6.94
A young man is found murdered in the driver's seat of an expensive sports car he was delivering to a diplomat. As Carrie and Al investigate each clue, it leads them to a different culprit with different motives. They must solve the crime before the diplomat leaves the country.
29	11	"Maps and Legends"	Jean de Segonzac	Quinton Peeples	September 8, 2013	5.76
An urban explorer is found dead in a library with symptoms similar to that of Ebola virus. It is later ascertained that the explorer died due to continuous exposure to RDX. Carrie and Al investigate and deduce that the urban explorer and his close friend were hunting a treasure believed to be hidden under the streets of New York. They must now follow the clues left by him and find the treasure before the streets underneath New York are blown up.
30	9	"Till Death"	David Platt	Barry Schkolnick	April 4, 2014	7.32
Carrie and Al pose as a married couple to catch a killer who may be responsible for a series of unsolved homicides that Al investigated years earlier.
31	12	"Flesh and Blood"	Oz Scott	Wendy Battles	April 11, 2014	7.59
Carrie catches Jackie, an elusive assassin and master of disguise (whom she met and previously lost in "Day of the Jackie"), but then is forced to trust the woman when it is revealed she has vital information that could prevent a terrorist attack on New York City.
32	7	"Manhunt"	Jan Eliasberg	Barry Schindel	April 18, 2014	7.17
Carrie and Al hunt for a recently paroled criminal who may be responsible for a defense attorney's death and who may also be out to settle other scores. The investigation leads to homicide and rape cases dating back 10 years.
33	8	"East of Islip"	Rick Bota	Spencer Hudnut	April 25, 2014	7.64
When the body of a young waitress washes ashore in the Hamptons, Carrie's and Al's boss offers them a "paid vacation" in his beautiful Southampton cottage in order to help local law enforcement find the killer, who may or may not be related to a previous serial killer.
34	10	"Omega Hour"	Jean de Segonzac	Bill Chais	May 2, 2014	7.59
When Carrie and Elliott are attending a party sponsored by the mayor, a group of criminals seize control of the building, and demand a hefty ransom. It is up to Carrie to thwart their plans by playing from the Die Hard book.
35	13	"Reunion"	Paul Holahan	Bill Chais & John Bellucci	May 9, 2014	7.26
Carrie's high school reunion is suddenly cut short when an alum winds up dead. Carrie has to remember back 22 years to understand the events that led to this crime.

== Ratings ==
#	Title	Air date	Ratings/Share (18–49)	Viewers (millions)
1	"Big Time"	July 28, 2013	1.3/4	7.15
2	"Incognito"	August 4, 2013	1.2/3	7.10
3	"Day of the Jackie"	August 11, 2013	1.1/3	6.88
4	"Memory Kings"	August 18, 2013	1.1/3	6.57
5	"Past Tense"	August 25, 2013	1.1/3	6.80
6	"Line Up or Shut Up"	September 1, 2013	1.0/3	6.94
7	"Maps and Legends"	September 8, 2013	1.0/3	5.76
8	"Till Death"	April 4, 2014	0.9/4	7.32
9	"Flesh and Blood"	April 11, 2014	1.0/4	7.59
10	"Manhunt"	April 18, 2014	0.9/4	7.17
11	"East of Islip"	April 25, 2014	0.9/3	7.64
12	"Omega Hour"	May 2, 2014	1.0/4	7.59
13	"Reunion"	May 9, 2014	0.8/3	7.26
