= Unforgettable season 1 =

Unforgettable
- Season 1
- DVD cover
- No. of episodes: 22

Release
- Original network: CBS
- Original release: September 20, 2011 – May 8, 2012

Season chronology
- Next → Season 2

The first season of the CBS American television drama series Unforgettable premiered on September 20, 2011, and concluded on May 8, 2012, after 22 episodes. It was broadcast on Tuesdays at 10:00 pm.

== Plot ==
A former Syracuse, New York, police detective, Carrie Wells, has hyperthymesia, a rare medical condition that gives her the ability to visually remember everything. She reluctantly joins the New York City Police Department's Queens homicide unit after her former boyfriend and partner asks for help with solving a case. The move allows her to try to find out the one thing she has been unable to remember, which is what happened on the day her sister was murdered.

== Cast ==
=== Main cast ===
- Poppy Montgomery as Det. Carrie Wells
- Dylan Walsh as Lt. Al Burns
- Kevin Rankin as Det. Roe Sanders
- Michael Gaston as Det. Mike Costello
- Daya Vaidya as Det. Nina Inara
- Jane Curtin as Dr. Joanne Webster

=== Recurring cast ===
- Britt Lower as Tanya Sitkowsky
- Omar Metwally as ADA Adam Gilroy
- Deanna Dunagan as Alice Wells
- Haley Murphy as Rachel Wells
- James Urbaniak as Walter Morgan
- Victoria Leigh as Young Carrie

== Episodes ==
No. overall	No. in season	Title	Directed by	Written by	Original release date	U.S. viewers (millions)
1	1	"Pilot"	Niels Arden Oplev	Teleplay by : Ed Redlich & John Bellucci; Story by : Ed Redlich John Bellucci	September 20, 2011	14.09
Carrie Wells seems like a typical girl living in Manhattan, volunteering at a nursing home and living her life as usual. But there's more to Carrie than meets the eye. As a young girl Carrie was diagnosed with hyperthymesia, a rare condition that makes her memory so flawless that she can't forget anything. She remembers every person she has met and every place she has been, every conversation, every moment of joy, every heartbreak – except for one day: the day her sister Rachel was murdered. When a homicide case reunites Carrie with her ex-boyfriend and partner Al Burns, she decides to permanently join his unit despite her conflicted feelings and try to solve Rachel's murder. Because all she needs to do is remember.
2	2	"Heroes"	Niels Arden Oplev	Sherri Cooper & Jennifer Levin	September 27, 2011	12.43
Once Carrie is working as a cop again, she must help a little boy who witnessed his parents' murder. Thus, she has to put aside her memories about her past and her sister to help him remember who was the killer.
3	3	"Check Out Time"	John David Coles	Joan B. Weiss	October 4, 2011	11.58
Carrie tries to uncover the truth when a hotel maid (Maria Ortiz) accused of murder says she was defending herself against attempted rape.
4	4	"Up In Flames"	Martha Mitchell	Michael Foley & Erik Oleson	October 11, 2011	11.72
Carrie's memory becomes crucial when a crime scene is destroyed in an explosion, moments after she catches a glimpse from the place. They discover a plot involving prison inmates and the kidnapping of a little girl.
5	5	"With Honor"	Peter Werner	Erik Oleson	October 18, 2011	11.88
When Al's ex-partner is gunned down and the investigation reveals he may have been a dirty cop, Carrie must decide how to support him without getting too close. Al is in danger when he is lured to a trap, and his life is in Carrie's hands.
6	6	"Friended"	Niels Arden Oplev	Sherri Cooper & Jennifer Levin	October 25, 2011	11.25
Carrie and Al uncover a web of lies when a murder victim's identity is put into question, discovering that her entire persona was fabricated and she officially didn't even exist until 18 months prior.
7	7	"Road Block"	Jean de Segonzac	Teleplay by : Heather Bellson & Christal Henry; Story by : Jan Nash	November 1, 2011	11.34
When a single dad is killed, Carrie races to find both the killer and the man's daughter. Meanwhile, her search into Rachel's killer goes ahead, when her mother gives her a clue.
8	8	"Lost Things"	John Showalter	Jan Nash	November 8, 2011	11.72
When a public defender is murdered, the team finds out the killer may have greater plans in mind, which may lead to another murder.
9	9	"Golden Bird"	Paul Holahan	Michael Foley	November 15, 2011	11.37
Al and Carrie investigate the murder of a teen who seemed to have no enemies. Meanwhile, Carrie looks to her estranged aunt for help with the investigation into her sister's murder.
10	10	"Trajectories"	Anna Foerster	Erik Oleson	November 22, 2011	10.42
When investigating on a gang related crime scene suddenly gunfire goes off and a second murder occurs. Al and Carrie have to go through hundreds of bystanders to find out who is responsible for the killings.
11	11	"Spirited Away"	Karen Gaviola	Joan B. Weiss	December 13, 2011	11.30
When a renowned ghost hunter is killed, Carrie and Al discover that his death may be linked to a chilling discovery he made recently. With Britt Lower as Tanya Sitkowsky.
12	12	"Butterfly Effect"	Jace Alexander	Sam Montgomery	January 3, 2012	11.88
When a construction worker with a promising future is murdered, Carrie and Al wonder if his ties to the mob were the cause of his death or an unrelated coincidence. Meanwhile, Steve Cioffi, the son of a mob boss, falls in love with Carrie.
13	13	"Brotherhood"	John David Coles	Jim Adler	January 10, 2012	11.20
A routine investigation into a college student's death takes a disturbing turn for Carrie when a suspect makes a dangerous move to outwit her memory.
14	14	"Carrie's Caller"	Aaron Lipstadt	Ed Redlich & John Bellucci	February 7, 2012	11.86
A serial killer with knowledge of Carrie's memory abilities taunts the Queens PD as his list of victims grows. Jane Curtin joins the cast as Medical Examiner Joanne Webster.
15	15	"The Following Sea"	Oz Scott	Jan Nash & Michael Foley	February 14, 2012	11.03
When a key witness in his murder case vanishes before testifying, Al scrambles to find her before the suspect walks free.
16	16	"Heartbreak"	Anna J. Foerster	Spencer Hudnut	February 21, 2012	10.70
Carrie and Al are at a loss to explain how a murder victim mysteriously appeared in an empty ballpark.
17	17	"Blind Alleys"	Peter Werner	Erik Oleson & Heather Bellson	February 28, 2012	9.93
Al and Carrie are forced to the sidelines by a negotiator when the father of a suspect that Roe shot takes members of the Queens PD, including Nina, hostage in a desperate quest for justice.
18	18	"The Comeback"	Jean de Segonzac	Michael Foley & Christal Henry	March 20, 2012	11.32
When Carrie's latest case is stalled by a powerful family's influence, she receives assistance from a lawyer who may be the mysterious caller who orchestrated a series of sniper attacks.
19	19	"Allegiances"	Oz Scott	Joan B. Weiss	March 27, 2012	10.51
Carrie's personal and professional lives collide when her boyfriend, the son of a mob boss, is revealed to have ties to suspects in a murder investigation.
20	20	"You Are Here"	Jean de Segonzac	Jim Adler	April 10, 2012	9.45
Carrie and Al must get inside the mind of a deranged conspiracy theorist before he sets off a series of bombs.
21	21	"Endgame"	Ken Girotti	Jan Nash & Steven Maeda	May 1, 2012	10.66
When Walter Morgan turns up dead, Carrie must locate his killer while deflecting attention from the prime suspect - her. At the end of the episode the team finds a cellphone that belongs to the Syracuse Police Department.
22	22	"The Man in the Woods"	John David Coles	Ed Redlich & John Bellucci	May 8, 2012	10.84
On the trail of her sister's murderer, Carrie returns to Syracuse, where the killer may have struck again. Things get complicated when Carrie is kidnapped. At the end of the episode Carrie finds a box with all the information about Rachel's murder.

== Ratings ==
Viewership and ratings per episode of Unforgettable season 1
No.	Title	Air date	Rating/share (18–49)	Viewers (millions)
1	"Pilot"	September 20, 2011	2.9/8	14.09
2	"Heroes"	September 27, 2011	2.5/6	12.43
3	"Check Out Time"	October 4, 2011	2.5/6	11.58
4	"Up In Flames"	October 11, 2011	2.3/6	11.72
5	"With Honor"	October 18, 2011	2.5/6	11.88
6	"Friended"	October 25, 2011	2.5/6	11.25
7	"Road Block"	November 1, 2011	2.3/6	11.34
8	"Lost Things"	November 8, 2011	2.4/7	11.72
9	"Golden Bird"	November 15, 2011	2.4/7	11.37
10	"Trajectories"	November 22, 2011	2.2/6	10.42
11	"Spirited Away"	December 13, 2011	2.2/6	11.30
12	"Butterfly Effect"	January 3, 2012	2.6/6	11.88
13	"Brotherhood"	January 10, 2012	2.1/6	11.20
14	"Carrie's Caller"	February 7, 2012	2.2/6	11.86
15	"The Following Sea"	February 14, 2012	2.3/6	11.03
16	"Heartbreak"	February 21, 2012	2.0/5	10.70
17	"Blind Alleys"	February 28, 2012	1.9/5	9.93
18	"The Comeback"	March 20, 2012	2.1/6	11.32
19	"Allegiances"	March 27, 2012	2.1/6	10.51
20	"You Are Here"	April 10, 2012	1.8/5	9.45
21	"Endgame"	May 1, 2012	1.8/5	10.66
22	"The Man in the Woods"	May 8, 2012	2.0/5	10.84
