= Gusano =

Insult for dissident Cubans and Cuban Americans

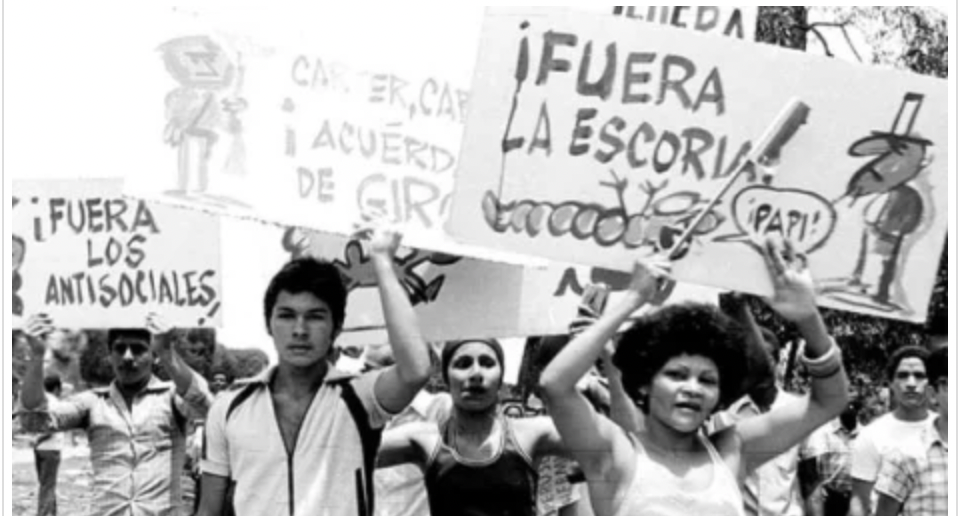
March in Cuba during the Mariel boatlift. Marcher (front) holds sign reading "¡Fuera la escoria!" (out with the filth) and depicts a worm caricature fawning at Uncle Sam.

Gusano (lit. worm, fem. gusana) is the Spanish language term for "worm". It is a name coined by Fidel Castro originally referring to those who fled Cuba after the overthrow of the dictator Fulgencio Batista. Later it was used to describe Cuban exiles in general, and their Cuban-American descendants. By the 1970s, Fidel Castro had widely adopted the term in speeches to refer to Cubans that had fled the country, as well as resident Cubans who applied to leave. It has also sometimes been used as a prideful self-identifying term amongst Cuban exiles.

The popularity of the term gusano has changed throughout its history. It was first used to describe Cuban emigrants in the early 1960s, who were considered "counter-revolutionary", or politically spineless. The word was then often used during acts of repudiation against emigrants. The negative perception of diasporic Cubans as gusanos changed with the dialogue of 1978, which allowed many exiles to return to visit relatives, often bringing money. The Mariel boatlift interrupted this cultural reconciliation. In the 1990s, relations with diasporic Cubans in Cuban families improved, and the term gusano fell out of use.

Throughout its use history, the term has often been utilized in a style of Cuban political rhetoric which strictly views politics as a dichotomy of good versus evil, with revolutionary "new men" standing against all things and people labeled "gusano". In post-revolutionary Cuba, the many things and people considered "gusano" or "gusanera", have included the lumpenproletariat, homosexuals, and various perceived threats to Cuban nationalism.

== Usage in Cuba ==
=== Origins ===
The term gusano was first used to mean "counter-revolutionary" in a speech by Castro in which he spoke of "shaking the tree until the worms fall out". Historian Michael Bustamante states that the origins of the word are unclear, stating that the term was either directly coined by Fidel Castro as a simple insult, or the term originated as a slang word for Cubans leaving the country, because "gusano" ("worm") is Spanish slang for "duffel bag".

The term was coined as Cuba experienced several waves of emigration after the revolution, the first wave being mostly political dissidents and wealthy Cubans who had profited under Batista's dictatorship. By 1962, over 200,000 had emigrated to Miami since the revolution. Many chants would evolve from the phrase, such as "Con saya o pantalón, gusanos al paredón." (If wearing skirts or if wearing pants, gusanos [will turn] towards the wall [to be executed]). At this time, there were reports that insults towards gusanos were being blared from the loudspeakers at Havana Airport.

To a lesser extent, many Cubans who stayed in the country, but were against the revolution, adopted the label as a badge of honor (or a symbol of oppression), referring to themselves as gusano or gusana to state their dissatisfaction with the Castro government. In 1962, Cuban government posters showed an image of a fist crushing a gusano. In 1963, anti-revolutionaries distributed "gusano leaflets" with political cartoons involving worms. According to a 1967 article by the AP, commando raids on Cuba by exiles were utilised by Castro to galvanise Cubans against "Yanquis", "gusanos" and exiles. In 1968 there was a report that the Cuban government had encouraged the public to watch and attack people whom it described as "counter-revolutionary worms" or gusanos.

=== Post-revolutionary media ===
The military fort, Castillo del Príncipe, was used to house those captured during the Bay of Pigs Invasion. Their wives would frequent the establishment in hopes to see their husbands and sons, and due to the large amount of anti-revolutionary women loitering around, the prison became colloquially known as La Gusaneria.

By 1961, several thousand Cubans were employed at The United States Guantanamo Bay Naval Base. They were referred to as gusanos by the public.

In September or October 1961, over the course of a week, 12 deceased bodies were discovered throughout Havana with notes attached to them that said "gusanos with pro-revolutionary [ideologies], CIA agents, who tried to escape to the United States." In a mass-jailing of political dissidents in 1961, Castro's government used defunct sewers as prisons for accused anti-revolutionaries. In one of the sewers, a Canadian priest who had been imprisoned said he would dress an icon and called her "The Virgin of the Gusanos".

=== Bay of Pigs Invasion ===
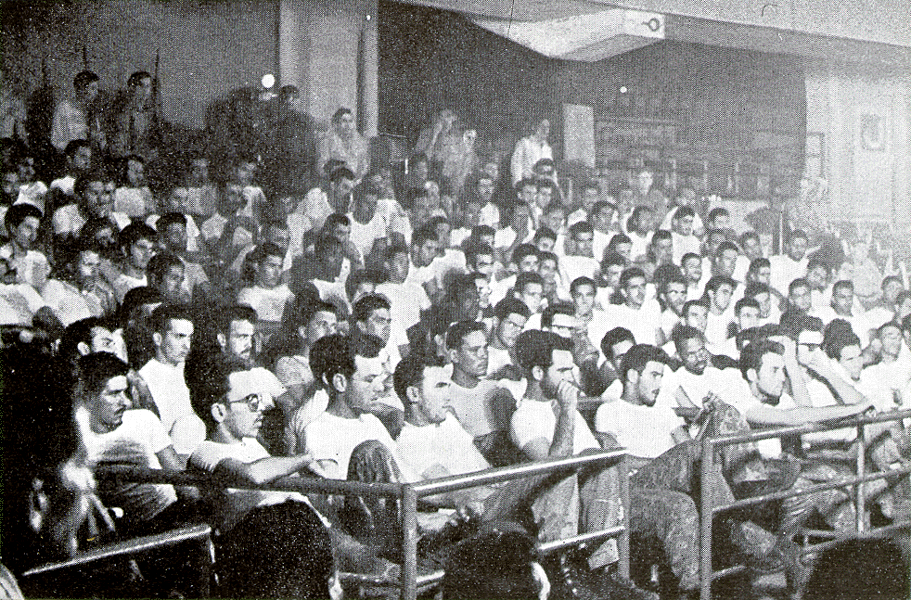
Brigade 2506 prisoners at Havana sports palace in 1961.

Those who were captured by the Cuban government during the bay of Pigs invasion were called gusanos and "North American puppets" by their guards. In May 1961, a state-run radio station called Costa Rican politicians gusanos in response to a call from their government urging the OAS to take action against the Cuban government. Over 1,000 men were captured during the Bay of Pigs invasion, and Castro issued a ransom to the United States, saying "Si los imperialistas no quieren que sus gusanos trabajen, que los cambien por tractores." (If the imperialists do not want their gusanos to work, they should exchange them for tractors).

A 1965 article in The Miami Herald said that members of the Cuban defence committees categorised their neighbours as either "revolutionary" or gusano.

=== Further usage ===
In relation to the anti-American and anti-fidelista ties, the term was stigmatized further upon the labelling of terrorists as gusanos who sought to destroy the country. In November 1961, Pedro Arias Hernandez, who was stationed at Guanabacoa's Nico Lopez Refinery, was killed when 3 people attacked the state-run business. The killers were labelled gusanos by the media, and were accused of working for the CIA. Many protests, including demonstrations against the famine, unrelated to the socialist policy of the government, had their protestors classified as gusanos. In 1962, Castro said that "those gusanos must be stopped. The street belongs to us, the gusano parlachin, the quintacolumnista must be punished physically, but without taking him to the wall. Now, if they engage in sabotage, that is another matter..."

During the 1962 wildfires that destroyed sugarcane plantations, locals in Cubas were reported saying that "gusanos have infiltrated the canefields." This led to quick military tribunals resulting in death by firing squad for "gusanos" who sought to destroy Cuban farms. In a 1961 speech in Santiago de Cuba, Raúl Castro said, "Our motherland will be attacked again by those gusanos allied with [American] imperialism, who will try to bring back all the bad things that the revolution is dominating. Our country will [be prepared] to eliminate them." Vigilante groups were formed for people to report their neighbors for "anti-revolutionary behavior", labelling them gusanos. According to Miami Herald report Al Burt, the government could detain such people arbirtrarily. Imprisoned political dissidents awaiting trial are recorded to have carved Soy Gusano on their jail cells.

In an interview with the Tampa Tribune, Cuban professional boxer Luis Manuel Rodríguez, who had supported the Batista regime, recalled a time when a Cuban soldier came up to him with a machine gun, called him a gusano, and put a threat on his life.

Anyone who was accused or revealed to be building a stockpile of food outside of government rations were also labeled gusanos. The 20 and 25 Centavo coins were given gusano as a nickname due to a shortage of the coins that was rumored to be caused by anti-revolutionaries hoarding them for personal use. Many in the late 1960s who applied to leave the country were forced to work farms as gusano laborers before their departure was approved by the Cuban government. According to British reporter Michael Frayn of the London Observer, in 1969, there were as many as 200,000 laborers working in the agricultural camps at any given point, and that only a quarter could expect to be granted leave by the end of the year. By 1969, 500,000 had left the country since 1959.

=== El Diálogo ===
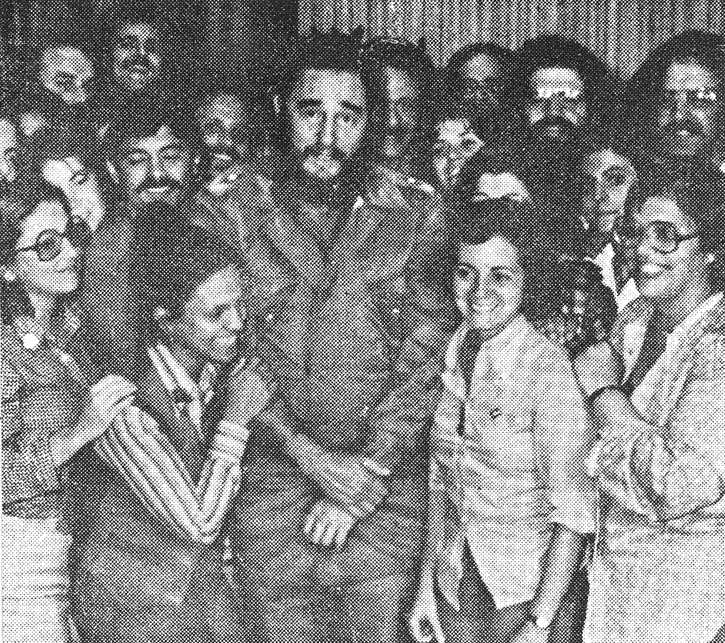
Cuban exiles of the Antonio Maceo Brigade meet Fidel Castro in 1978.

The Antonio Maceo Brigade, a Cuban solidarity travel group founded in 1977, consisted of Cuban exiles who hoped to prove that they were not counterrevolutionary "gusanos". This desire sprouted from the dual rejection they faced from both right-wing Cuban exiles and left-wing North Americans. At the time, the American left-wing Cuban solidarity group the Venceremos Brigade specifically rejected Cuban American members often on the belief that all Cuban Americans are middle class and counterrevolutionary "gusanos".

The Diálogo reconciliation conferences of 1978, resulted from the visits of the Antonio Maceo Brigade. Fidel Castro took a historically unusual stance when addressing Cuban exile attendants at the conference. He did not refer to the exiles as "gusanos", "escoria" (scum), or "apatriadas" (stateless/non-Cuban), but instead with the more polite title "cuban community abroad". Castro also stated in the conference that he may have "misjudged" the community, and was generally happy to meet with exiles.

One of the agreements from the Diálogo was for the right of Cuban exiles to return to Cuba to visit family. The unfolding family visits became a watershed moment in Cuban culture, because the personal encounters with exiles led many Cuban families to reinterpret their own opinion of the exiles. Many returning family members did not fit into the image of the gusano as portrayed in Cuban media. Few were active counter-revolutionaries, or rich industrialists, and most were working-class Cubans who desired a better life in the United States. Visiting exiles also brought gifts for family members, which many local Cubans could not afford. These remittances improved the image of Cuban exiles, further reducing their reputation as gusanos, and now cementing them as benefactors. A common joke developed in Cuba: "the gusanos had turned into butterflies", implying exiles were returning with new luxuries.

=== Mariel boatlift ===
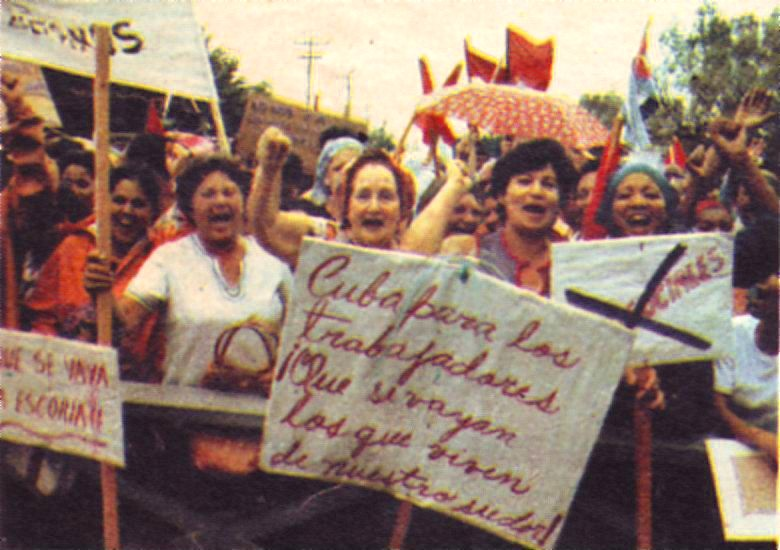
Cubans demonstrating against Mariel emigrants. Spanish language signs demand the emigrants be expelled from the island.

On April 1, 1980, six Cuban citizens made their way into the Peruvian embassy in Havana, Cuba, instigating an international crisis over the diplomatic status of around 10,000 asylum-seeking Cubans who joined them over the following days. The Cuban government then allowed for an exodus of all asylum-seekers through Mariel harbor, to deescalate the rush to embassies.

The Cuban government considered the exodus a sort of social cleansing of the nations' so-called undesirables and organized acts of repudiation against prospective emigrants, often insulting them as "gusanos", but now more often as "escoria" ("scum"), which was eclipsing the old insult of "gusano". This change in vernacular reflected the change in emigration. While before Mariel, many middle-class and upper-class Cubans emigrated, during the Mariel boatlift, most of the emigrants were working-class and lumpen Cubans.

=== 1994 Cuban rafter crisis ===
During the 1990s, many poorer Cubans left due to economic stagnation, especially following the collapse of the Soviet Union. After riots erupted in Cuba over demands to exit, Fidel Castro announced in 1994, that all Cubans wishing to leave could peacefully exit by raft.

Cultural scholar Desiree Diaz claims that Cuban films in the 1990s rarely referred to diasporic Cubans as "gusanos", but as "the diaspora". Diaz argues that Cuban cinema in the 1990s rejected old dogmas about emigration, often portraying contemporary emigration via raft as a moral dilemma without clear answers. Musicologist Jan Fairley claims that much Cuban music in the 1990s contained bittersweet lyrics about family members who joined "the diaspora", and were missed by family in Cuba. The demonization of Cuban exiles as "gusanos" was absent in lyrics about Cuban emigrants, indicating a cultural evolution regarding emigrants.

Since the rafter exodus, certain rafter emigrants have adopted a state of "semi-exilio" ("semi-exile"), where they work in Miami, but frequently return to Cuba for long stays, and bring money made in Miami to family in Cuba. These frequently returning Cubans are informally called "gusañeros", a combination of the word "gusano", and "compañero'" ("comrade").

=== 2021 protests ===
In 2021 Cubans who attended an anti-government protest in Matanzas in response to the governments handling of coronavirus, energy shortages and the economy, were detained and interrogated in a local facility called "Técnico" run by Cuba's state security services. While detained a man, Michel Parra was beaten with a baton, repeatedly called a gusano and threatened to have he and his family shot.

== Usage outside Cuba ==
=== United States ===
Starting as early as the late 1950s, after the settlement of the Cuban diaspora, large portions of Cubans settled in Florida, and specifically in Miami. Florida's proximity to Cuba naturally led to a large influx of Cubans in the region, hence, much of the use of the word gusano was found in those areas with a high concentration of Cubans.

In 1970, Spanish Tampa newspaper El Sol received messages from pro-Castro Cubans who threatened the paper's advertisers, saying "Merchants who advertise in El Sol sink to the level of gusanos, and will be boycotted if they persist, [be] warned." The left-wing political organization, The Young Lords, ran a free breakfast programme at the Harlem First Spanish United Methodist Church, which was run by a Cuban exile preacher. The Young Lords referred to the church as a gusano establishment.

In a 1996 article called Intolerancia, Miami Herald writer Roberto Luque Escalona describes his frustration with the term, with it being prevalent among supporters of Castro, and often targeted at Cuban entrepreneurs in Florida. Escalona showed an example of the caricature of la gusanera de Miami, a stigma attached to Cubans who moved to Florida and make their own livings under private enterprises, rather than the government-run economy of Cuba.

In an autobiographical article published in 2001, Cuban writer Ileana Fuentes claims she witnessed the term "gusano" frequently applied to Cuban immigrants by liberals and leftists in the United States, using the insult to imply all Cuban immigrants were uniformly traitors to the Cuban Revolution. According to Fuentes, the frequent use of the insult "gusano" alienated many Cuban Americans from the American Left.

Writer Dave Sandoval published a 2015 article for the website Latino Rebels, claiming the term is an ethnic slur directed at Cuban exiles, which he described as an ethnic subgroup. He writes that the term was "created in order to make two sides of an ethnic group become enemies, instead of family, based on their geography". Sylvan Calko Perlmutter, wrote a 2016 article for Miscellany News, Vassar College's student newspaper, which says 'gusano' was a pejorative term that had been "used against Cuban-Americans by non-Cuban Latinos sympathetic to revolutionary Cuba".

==== Puerto Rico ====
The first migration to Puerto Rico after the 1959 revolution consisted of mostly white Cuban professionals and business owners, who were nicknamed "golden exiles" because of their upper socio-economic status in Cuba. These "golden" Cubans were initially well received but were later viewed with contempt by middle class Puerto Ricans, who thought they were being hired in preference to Puerto Ricans. Puerto Ricans referred to these Cuban immigrants as "Jews of the Caribbean" or "opportunistic and ungrateful parasites". Another term used to describe Cubans by some sections of Puerto Rican society was gusanos, which meant Cubans who abandoned and opposed the Cuban revolution.

=== International usage ===
The use of the term is not only limited to Cuba and Cubans. In 1962, The Chilean state-run press accused "Cuban gusanos in Miami" of having planned an attempt on the life of then-president Jorge Alessandri during his stopover in Washington, D.C. on December 10.

During the late 1960s, former Bolivian Minister of the Interior Antonio Arguedas gave press interviews following his involvement in the publication of Che Guevara's diary in late 1967. He reported that prior to his fleeing of Bolivia to Chile, it was common for the Bolivian Cabinet to refer to their Cuban colleagues in exile as gusanos.

An article written in 2023 for the Australian newspaper Green Left advises readers to ignore "gusanos" on social medica, defining "gusanos" as "Cuban-born counter-revolutionaries, especially those now living in the US", who post "false and misleading information about the Cuban government", including the assertion that Cuba is a "dictatorship".

== Implications ==
=== Cuban nationalism ===
Literary scholar Lillian Manzor claims that the denigration of the post-1959 Cuban diaspora as "gusanos", enflames a stark divide within Cuban national identity. Two separate Cuban communities arise from this divide, each modeled off the rejection of the other as an absolute evil. Fidelista Cubans reject anything related to the "gusano" diaspora, in an effort to embody its opposite: the Cuban new man; while Miami exiles seek to reject anything related to revolutionary Cuba, embracing the identity of Cuba's blunt enemy as portrayed in the gusano stereotype. Literary scholar Christina M. García asserts that the Cuban state views human life in general in a strict binary, where one is hopefully a Cuban new man, in rejection of the "gusano" dissident.

Anthropologist Denise Blum claims that the denigration of dissidents as "gusanos" is done to evoke a patriotic passion to support the Cuban state. When internal enemies are dubbed "gusanos", they are always classed together as one enemy force, despite their differences, and are considered in legion with Cuba's foreign enemy: American imperialism. This rhetoric reinforces a narrative where the Cuban state represents a simple good, while it opposes a supposedly unified horde of evil enemies. Literary scholar Enrique Morales-Diaz asserts that a Cuban only becomes labeled a "gusano" once they have somehow ruptured from the simplistic good versus evil dichotomy of Marxist-Leninist rhetoric, which then makes the troubling Cuban an obstacle in the homogenizing of the Cuban nation. Gusanos are then considered "counter-revolutionaries" in legion with foreign imperialists, creating the impression that anything outside the bounds of Cuban revolutionary ideology is all equally severe and condemnable.

Cultural scholar José Esteban Muñoz asserts that the denigration of post-1959 Cuban emigrants as "gusanos", constructs a "big Other" for revolutionary Cubans, which is used as an Other to project guilt onto. A phenomenon part of a greater dynamic of guilt projection done by both Cuban exiles, and Fidelista Cubans, onto each other, splitting the greater Cuban nation.

Latino Studies scholar Miguel A. De La Torre states that the denigration of Cuban emigrants as "gusanos" within Cuba, creates a constant sense of ethnic homelessness amongst diasporic Cubans. Cuban refugees are never fully accepted as fellow countrymen by all Americans in their host country, because they are Hispanic, while they are often considered traitors in their home country.

=== Gender and sexuality ===
Gender studies scholar Carrie Hamilton has claimed that the demonization of Cubans as "gusanos", from the 1960s to the 1980s, was often done with homophobic vigor, implying emigrants are homosexuals or disgracefully akin to homosexuals.

According to literary scholar Jose A. Quiroga, a sort of Cuban Marxism developed in the 1960s, that saw the bourgeoisie, lumpenproletariat, and homosexuals, as all equally unproductive, either sexually or economically, thus justifying the labeling of them as "gusanera" ("worm-like"). Literary scholar Denis Berenschot claims the drive in Cuban revolutionary ideology to become new Cuban men involved the glorification of personal strength. The promotion of strength often involved the shunning of weakness, and perceived weaknesses were derided as effeminate or homosexual; thus the "gusanos" who failed to be "new men" were seen as weak and effeminate.

== See also ==
- Cuban dissident movement
- Cuban post-revolution exodus
- Dehumanization
- Jews of the Caribbean
- List of ethnic slurs
- Miami Mafia
- Military Units to Aid Production
