= Dialoguero =

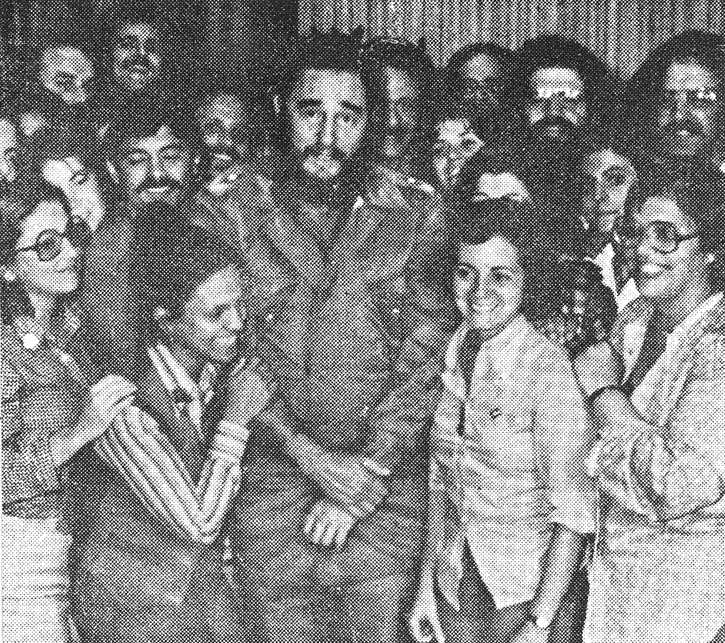
Dialogueros of the Antonio Maceo Brigade posing with Fidel Castro.

A dialoguero (roughly translating to "dialogue-seeker" in English) is a label for a person who wants to open negotiations with the Cuban government. The label was coined as an epithet by hard-line anti-communist Cuban exiles.

The first dialogueros to emerge in the United States were Cuban students in the 1960s and 70s. These students developed various student organizations dedicated to discussing Cuban identity, culture, and politics. Many of these students were influenced by social movements and radical politics in the United States at the time. Various politically diverse publications were formed from these circles such as Nueva Generación, Joven Cuba, ¡Cuba Va!, Krisis, and Areíto. While these journals generally focused on developing Cuban identity, criticizing violent anti-communism and desiring dialogue with Cuba, they often disagreed about the successfulness of the Castro government and the role of Cuban Americans in Cuban politics. The emergence of dialogueros broke the staunch conservative atmosphere of Cuban exile politics, and opened the possibility of a Cuban-American left.

== History ==
=== Origins ===
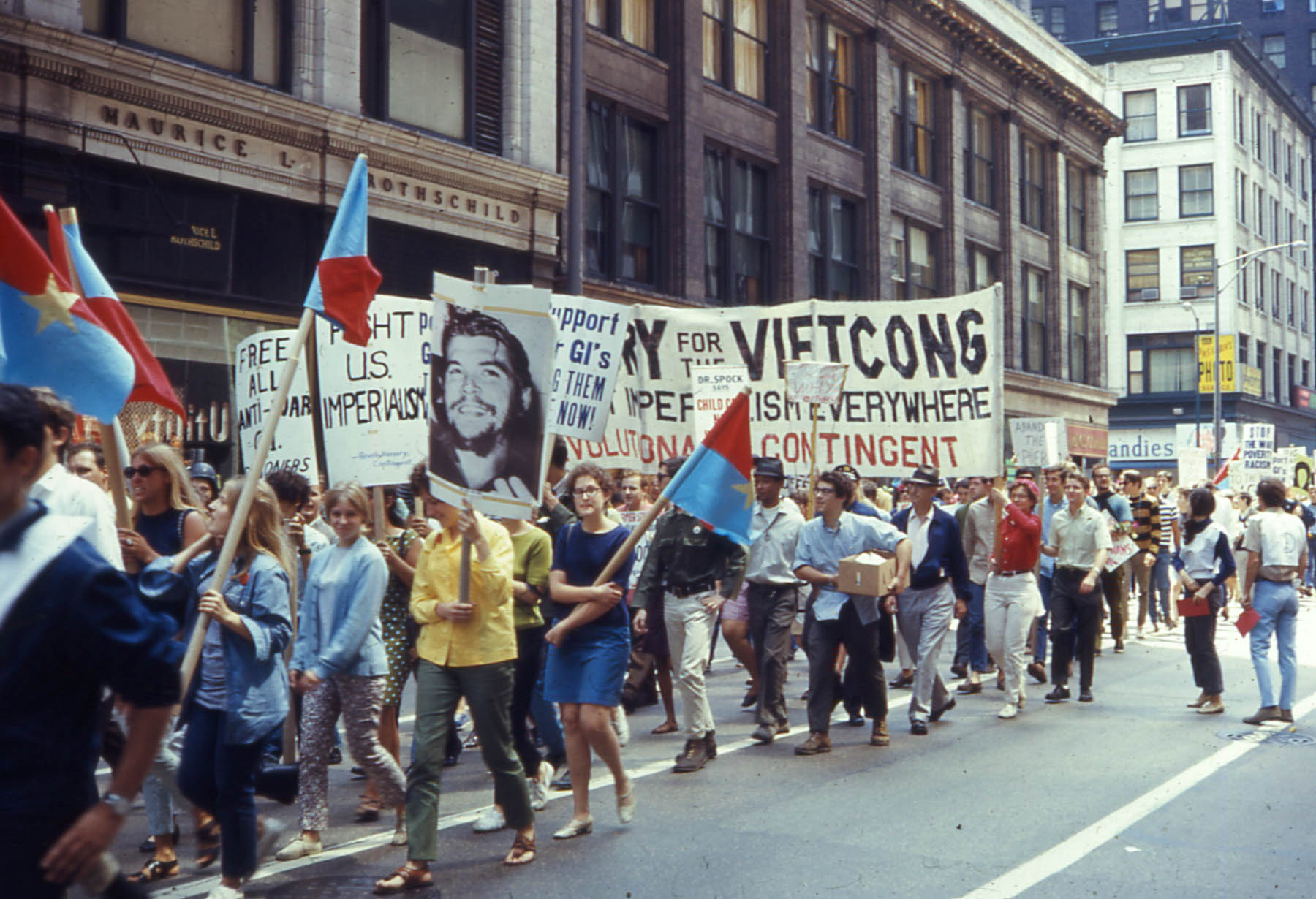
1968 anti-war marchers carrying a picture of Che Guevara.

By 1965 the last counterrevolutionary guerrillas in Cuba would be captured and another wave of Cuban emigration would start via the Camarioca boatlift. By this time hope in overthrowing Fidel Castro was fading, and exiles became concerned with new hardships faced in the United States. Cuban reformists would emerge who advocated for the needs of underprivileged Cuban emigrants. This interest in improving social conditions sparked an interest in some Cuban exiles in the social benefits brought to Cuba by the Cuban government.

Many young Cubans who departed from the island in the early years of the Cuban exile would later struggle with their identity and assimilation in a foreign land. As young Cubans began to come of age, in the United States many became interested in Cuban identity, exiles' relationship to Cuba, and Cuban-Americans' relationship with other American minorities. This younger generation also experienced the United States during the rising anti-war movement, civil rights movement, and feminist movement of the 1960s, causing them to be influenced by radicals that encouraged political introspection, and social justice. Figures like Fidel Castro and Che Guevara were also heavily praised among American student radicals at the time. Those most likely to become more radical were Cubans who were more culturally isolated from being outside the Cuban enclave of Miami.

=== Formation ===
Some of the first people to voice a desire to normalize relations with Cuba were academics. The Miami-based Institution of Cuban Studies first met in 1969 and called for less aggressive relations with Cuba. Cuban and American based scholars began to collaborate and managed to cooperate on scholarly works at the time, despite legal restrictions.

One of the first student organizations to call for a rapprochement with Cuba would be the Juventud Cubana Socialista in New York City. They would call for the return of Cuban exiles to Cuba to support government campaigns on the island. The organization was short lived but became a model for future organizations.

Of the younger generation of more left-wing Cuban exiles many would come to different conclusions as to what they believed and what they should do. Some would feel obligated as Cubans to protest human rights violations in Cuba, others would come to view the Cuban Revolution as tolerable and an inevitable event in Cuba's history, and some would even come to give radical outright sympathies for the Cuban government. Those who felt obligated to protest the Cuban government joined protest organizations like Directorio Revolucionario Estudiantil, or Abdala. Others would turn to writing and founded many journals like Nueva Generación, Joven Cuba, ¡Cuba Va!, Krisis, and Areíto where scholarly articles about Cuban history and culture would be shared as well as idealistic calls to action. These journals would reflect various political positions. Joven Cuba often advocated that Cuban exiles work for social change in the United States with other Latinos and minority groups, ¡Cuba Va! often advocated that Cubans on and off the island constituted one single people, and Areíto was the most radical advocating that Cuban exiles are destined to Cuba and participate in its revolutionary changes. Of the young Cubans that were radicalized many were still uncomfortable with their new beliefs, those that gained sympathies for the Cuban government still were repulsed by the regime's repressive activities, and those far-leftists that would come to fully support the Cuban government found that other non-Cuban leftists often stereotyped them as right-wing anti-communists for being Cubans.

=== Rapprochement and backlash ===
Between 1972 and 1976 over a hundred terrorist bombings would occur in Miami targeting people believed to be conspiring with the Cuban government.

In 1973 Lourdes Casal became the first Cuban exile to return to Cuba with the help of the Instituto Cubano de Amistad con los Pueblos. Contributors to the journal Areíto would be granted travel visas to Cuba and visited the island in 1977, the travelers eventually labeled themselves as the Antonio Maceo Brigade. In 1978 the Cuban government opened a dialogue with representatives from the Cuban exile community. The dialogue resulted in the release of political prisoners, and the ability for exiles to travel to Cuba which brought in 100,000 exiles to visit by 1979.

In 1979 Carlos Muñiz Varela would be assassinated by extremists for his participation in the Antonio Maceo Brigade and 1978 dialogue. In 1982 when the Antonio Maceo Brigade opened a press conference in Miami they would be heckled until being forced to cancel the event.

=== 1990 proposals ===
In 1990 in the wake of the Revolutions of 1989 various observers believed the Cuban government would soon collapse as other Eastern Bloc countries had. Cuban activist organizations in Cuba and the United States began calling for negotiations with the Cuban government to ensure democratic measures would be put in place in Cuba. The idea stirred intense controversy again in Cuban exile circles and was never executed.

== Legacy ==
=== Cuban studies ===
Journals and organizations dedicated to Cuban Studies emerged alongside the many dialoguero journals interested in Cuban culture at the time. By 1975 the journal "Cuban Studies" would begin publication.

=== Disillusion ===
Most of the original journals fell out of print by the late 1970s but Areíto continued into the mid 1980s. Some members of Areíto and the Antonio Maceo Brigade became disillusioned with the Cuban government with age, as they believed they saw the failures of the many promises the government made to advance the country.

== See also ==
- Cuba–United States relations
- Cuban Thaw
