= Jews of the Caribbean =

Ethnic nickname for Cuban people comparing them to Jews

Jews of the Caribbean is an ethnic nickname for Cuban people, which alludes that Cubans and Jews share a variety of attributes. The nickname is used within and outside of Cuba, and can be used as an insult for Cubans, implying Cubans are greedy like Jews, or a term of endearment used by Cubans, which pridefully asserts common virtues and struggles with Jewish people.

The many implied allegories between Cubans and Jews include, supposed similarities in financial prowess, desires to return to their homelands, cultural insularity, and the global importance of Israel and Cuba despite each nation's small geographical size.

== Allegories ==
=== Cuba and Israel ===
Cuban exiles in the Cuban-American lobby sometimes assert that they are following a "Jewish model", in that, like American Jews, Cuban Americans will be loyal American citizens who will fiercely lobby for the well-being of another nation. For Cuban Americans this means lobbying for a democratic Cuba, and for American Jews, this means lobbying for a powerful Israel.

Within Cuba, it is uncommon for Cubans to refer to themselves as honorary Jews in some reference to commercial or political power, as is done outside the island. Instead, Cubans on the island that compare themselves to Jews, do so more in an effort to highlight the similarities between Cuba and Israel. Both nations are portrayed as geographically small, both attempting to create paradise on earth, but stifled by aggressive neighbors, however both are fiercely combative in the face of foreign adversaries.

Writer Achy Obejas has devoted much writing in her book Days of Awe, arguing the comparison of Cubans to Jews is often insulting, but can be made deeper and more insightful. Obejas argues both diasporic Cubans and Jews are nostalgically tied to their homeland, and both desire for return. Obejas' writing has been majorly responsible for reinventing the comparison between Cubans and Jews, within Cuban American literature.

=== Financial prowess ===
During the first mass exodus of Cuban professionals and business owners in the 1960s, nicknamed "golden exiles", these "golden" Cubans settled in Puerto Rico, quickly integrating into the Puerto Rican middle class. This sudden success was viewed with contempt by other middle class Puerto Ricans, and Cuban immigrants were quickly referred to as "gusanos" or "Jews of the Caribbean". In Puerto Rico, the phrase "Jews of the Caribbean" is used to highlight a greed that Cuban exiles allegedly share with Jews. Cuban exiles are claimed to be too wealthy, sly entrepreneurs, and only do business with their own ethnic group. Cubans in Puerto Rico are also often called "blanquitos" ("little whites") or "riquitos" ("little rich ones"), inferring that Cuban exiles are white, wealthy, and thus socially undesirable compared to fellow humble Puerto Ricans.

Cubans in Miami are also sometimes referred to as the "Jews of the Caribbean", by other Latin Americans living in Miami, as a disparaging term, implying both Cubans and Jews are greedy and too powerful in business. In tandem, Cubans in Miami also sometimes refer to themselves as the "Jews of the Caribbean", with pride, referencing a shared business acumen. Founder of the Cuban American National Foundation, Jorge Mas Canosa, once prouldy proclaimed in 1992 in front of a majority Jewish audience in Miami: "We are the same people. That’s why they call us ‘the Jews of the Caribbean".

Writer Achy Obejas argues that the use of the term "Jews of the Caribbean" in reference to Cuban exiles' supposed business savvy, has always been insulting to both Cubans and Jews. It implies that Cubans are greedy entrepreneurs, responsible for the economic transformation of Miami, and should not be trusted, much like Jews who are implied to not be trustworthy for also being corrupt greedy entrepreneurs.

Journalist John Paul Rathbone claims in his book The Sugar King of Havana that Cubans refer to themselves as the "Jews of the Caribbean", to cheekily imply they are commercially apt; a prideful comparison to Jewish business savvy. Rathbone claims this analogy is due to the long history of the sugar industry in Cuba, which was uniquely successful in the Caribbean throughout the early 20th century. Journalist Ann Louise Bardach also claims the priedful honorific title "Jews of the Caribbean" is still used in Cuba, but not in reference to commercial power, considering the steep economic decline since 1959. Instead, Cubans refer to themselves as Jews, to highlight the economic ingenuity of working Cubans who had to survive economic collapse.

== See also ==
- Gusano (nickname)
- Miami Mafia
