= Norman Redlich =

American lawyer (1925–2011)

Norman Redlich (November 12, 1925 – June 10, 2011) was an American lawyer and academic. As a lawyer he is best remembered for his pioneering work in establishing a system of pro bono defense for inmates in New York State who did not have the finances for a lawyer. He was also a staff member of the President's Commission on the Assassination of President Kennedy, known unofficially as the Warren Commission. He played an instrumental role in developing the single bullet theory.

== Background ==
Norman Redlich was born on November 12, 1925, in the Bronx, the second and youngest child of Pauline and Milton Redlich. His parents were Jewish, and they owned a small company which manufactured gardening and plumbing equipment. He served in the United States Army during World War II; after which he earned his B.A. degree from Williams College in 1947, and his L.L.B. degree from Yale Law School in 1950.

== Career ==
Redlich wrote for The Nation magazine in the late 1940s and into the 1950s. Early coverage included people like Elizabeth Bentley.

He then worked for his parents' company for most of the 1950s while simultaneously pursuing further graduate work at New York University. He received his LLM from the NYU law school in 1955. He joined the faculty at NYU in 1960.

=== Warren Commission Years ===
In 1963, J. Lee Rankin appointed Redlich as a special assistant on the Warren Commission. He was credited with disproving the Belin Theory, which related to a city bus ticket in Lee Harvey Oswald's pocket helping him escape to Mexico. However, controversy arose when a probe into Redlich's past and found that he was on the Emergency Civil Liberties Committee, which defended very controversial cases, including those of political activists and communists that the ACLU and other rights group did not.

Following a leak to right-wing politicians, on May 5, 1964, Ralph F. Beermann accused Redlich of defending Cuba on various issues. This incident and the ECLC ties led many to consider Redlich a communist sympathizer.

=== Later years ===
In 1960, Redlich joined the faculty of the New York University School of Law. In 1972, he was named as Corporation Counsel of New York City by then-mayor John Lindsay. In 1975, Redlich became dean of the NYU School of Law, a position he held until 1988.

From 1977 to 1999, Redlich was a member of the Vermont Law School board of trustees. In 1993, he received the highest award given to lawyers by the Lawyers' Committee for Civil Rights Under Law, the Whitney North Seymour Award. In 1996, he was awarded the Robert J. Kutak Award, given annually by the American Bar association's educational department; the award was given to those who the ABAS felt had made outstanding contributions in the field of legal education.

Redlich was chairman of the American Jewish Congress national governing council. He was also a member of the executive committee of the NAACP Legal Defense and Education Fund, and a member of the board of directors of The New Press.

== Personal life ==
Redlich was married to Evelyn Grobow, a pediatrician; they had three children, Carrie Redlich, Bonny Redlich, and Ed Redlich. Ed Redlich became a TV producer/writer, and Carrie A. Redlich became a professor of medicine at Yale University's School of Medicine and acting director of the Yale Occupational and Environmental Medicine Program.

During his NYU years, Redlich helped to preserve Washington Square Park.

Redlich died on June 10, 2011.

== Works ==
Redlich's works include three books:

- Professional Responsibility: a Problem Approach (1976; Little, Brown)
- Constitutional Law (with John Attanasio and Joel K. Goldstein)
- Understanding Constitutional Law (with Joel K. Goldstein)
- Standards of Professional Conduct for Lawyers and Judges (Little Brown & Co, January 1, 1984, ISBN 0316736589)

Articles he wrote include:

- "Spies in Government: The Bentley Story," The Nation (January 30, 1954)
- "Is the Wall Crumbling?" The Nation (September 25, 2000)
- "The 'Checkers' Speech: A Handbook for Demagogues," The Nation (April 23, 2009)
