= Unforgettable season 3 =

Unforgettable
- Season 3
- DVD cover
- No. of episodes: 13

Release
- Original network: CBS
- Original release: June 29 – September 14, 2014

Season chronology
- ← Previous; Season 2 Next → Season 4

The third season of Unforgettable an American police procedural drama television series originally aired on CBS from June 29, 2014, through September 14, 2014.

== Cast and characters ==
=== Main ===
- Poppy Montgomery as Det. Carrie Wells
- Dylan Walsh as Lt. Al Burns
- Jane Curtin as Dr. Joanne Webster
- Dallas Roberts as Eliot Delson
- Tawny Cypress as Det. Cherie Rollins-Murray
- James Hiroyuki Liao as Det. Jay Lee

=== Recurring ===
- Boris Kodjoe as Agent Francis Simms

== Episodes ==
No. overall	No. in season	Title	Directed by	Written by	Original release date	U.S. viewers (millions)
36	1	"New Hundred"	Peter Werner	Teleplay by : Ed Decter & Spencer Hudnut; Story by : Ed Decter	June 29, 2014	6.22
Carrie and Al are asked by the Secret Service to investigate a murder. In doing so, they uncover an assassin's counterfeiting ring.
37	2	"The Combination"	Matt Earl Beesley	Daniele Nathanson	July 6, 2014	6.20
A championship boxer is beaten to death, and Carrie and Al must look into his past to learn why he didn't defend himself or fight back.
38	3	"The Haircut"	Matthew Penn	Quinton Peeples	July 13, 2014	6.02
Carrie and Al must sort out office politics and government scandals when a reporter who wrote a story about the director of the NSA is found murdered. Meanwhile, Agent Simms returns to assist Carrie, and Al reconnects with an old girlfriend who may be able to help on the case.
39	4	"Cashing Out"	Jean de Segonzac	Spencer Hudnut	July 20, 2014	6.39
Carrie recognizes a murdered city official as someone she played poker with at an underground casino. After admitting her illegal activities, she volunteers to return undercover to the tables to find the killer.
40	5	"A Moveable Feast"	Andy Wolk	Gina Gold & Aurorae Khoo	July 27, 2014	6.45
Carrie and Al must find the connection between a murdered Coast Guard officer, a celebrity chef who threw him out of his restaurant, and some missing C-4 before the explosives are used.
41	6	"Stray Bullet"	Christine Moore	Barry Schkolnick	August 3, 2014	5.67
When Al becomes a murder suspect of a parolee he helped put in jail, Carrie must covertly prove his innocence.
42	7	"Throwing Shade"	Paul Holahan	Michael Reisz	August 17, 2014	6.28
One of Eliot's oldest friends, who was a campaign manager for a mayoral candidate, is murdered.
43	8	"The Island"	Oz Scott	Michael Reisz	August 24, 2014	6.39
The death of a college dropout leads Carrie and Al to a hidden community on an abandoned island near Manhattan.
44	10	"Admissions"	Michael Pressman	Sean Crouch	August 30, 2014	4.55
An elite prep school is investigated when a powerful CEO and father of one of the students is murdered.
45	9	"Fire and Ice"	Darnell Martin	Teleplay by : Quinton Peeples; Story by : Ed Decter	August 31, 2014	6.02
A bombing case is taken from Major Crimes and is tied to terrorists by Homeland Security. Webster befriends Murray's daughter.
46	11	"True Identity"	Nick Gomez	Sean Crouch & Daniele Nathanson	September 7, 2014	6.97
The investigation of a high-end matchmaking service employee's murder uncovers the victim's many secrets and a long suspect list.
47	13	"Moving On"	Paul Holahan	Teleplay by : Spencer Hudnut; Story by : Louisa Hill	September 14, 2014	6.45
An actor is found murdered on the set of his comeback movie. The team must deal in the world of celebrity fan obsession.
48	12	"DOA"	Matt Earl Beesley	Quinton Peeples	September 14, 2014	5.78
While protecting a US Senator, Carrie becomes exposed to a deadly toxin that leaves her unable to use her memory. The team rushes to find an antidote.

== Production ==
=== Development ===
Unforgettable was renewed for a third season of 13 episodes on September 27, 2013. Unforgettable was canceled on October 10, 2014. In February 2015, reported that Unforgettable was picked up by A&E for a fourth season.

== Broadcast ==
Season three of Unforgettable premiered on June 29, 2014.

== Reception ==
=== Ratings ===
Viewership and ratings per episode of Unforgettable season 3
No.	Title	Air date	Rating/share (18–49)	Viewers (millions)
1	"New Hundred"	June 29, 2014	0.9/3	6.22
2	"The Combination"	July 6, 2014	0.7/2	6.20
3	"The Haircut"	July 13, 2014	0.9/3	6.02
4	"Cashing Out"	July 20, 2014	1.0/3	6.39
5	"A Moveable Feast"	July 27, 2014	1.0/3	6.45
6	"Stray Bullet"	August 3, 2014	0.8/3	5.67
7	"Throwing Shade"	August 17, 2014	0.8/2	6.28
8	"The Island"	August 24, 2014	0.9/3	6.39
9	"Admissions"	August 30, 2014	0.6/3	4.55
10	"Fire and Ice"	August 31, 2014	1.0/4	6.02
11	"True Identity"	September 7, 2014	1.1/3	6.97
12	"Moving On"	September 14, 2014	1.1/3	6.45
13	"DOA"	September 14, 2014	1.0/3	5.78
