= El Diálogo =

- Part of the Cuban exodus
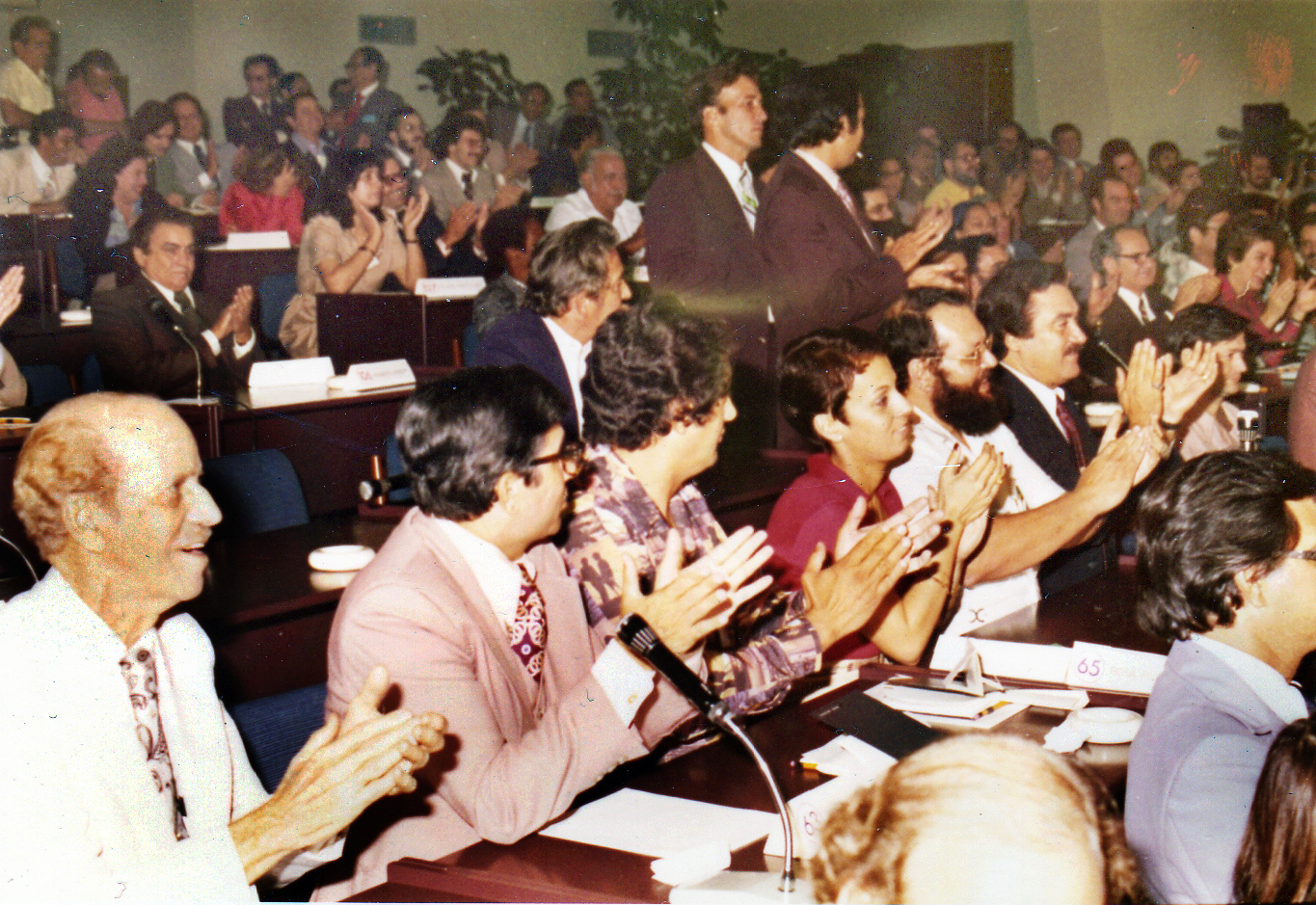
- Committee of 75 applauding Fidel Castro
- Date: November - December, 1978
- Also known as: The Dialogue (English)
- Cause: Dialoguero demands for diplomatic relations with Cuba; Worsening international image of Cuba; Carter administration foreign policy changes
- Organised by: Government of Cuba; Government of the United States
- Participants: Comite de los 75 (Committee of 75)
- Outcome: Release of political prisoners; Legal travel for Cuban exiles to Cuba; Internal conflict among Cuban exiles; Domestic discontent in Cuba

In 1978 negotiations known as El Diálogo (The Dialogue) occurred between Cuban exile groups and the Cuban government that resulted in the release of political prisoners.

The dialogue came after increasing calls for better diplomatic relations to Cuba from young Cuban American groups, and US President Jimmy Carter's new human rights oriented foreign policy. The negotiations originated with Jimmy Carter meeting in secret with Cuban officials in New York and Havana. After the talks resulted in prisoner release, Carter refused to publicly acknowledge his involvement, and the Cuban government decided to publicly invite Cuban exiles to negotiate with them for a prisoner release. The Comite de los 75 (Committee of 75) formed as the 75 Cuban exiles who would be allowed to negotiate with Cuba. The dialogue and eventual prisoner release came with a new friendlier attitude from Fidel Castro in addressing Cuban exiles. While previously he referred to them with the epithet "gusano", he now referred to them as the "Cuban community abroad". The dialogue also spurred intense internal debate among Cuban exiles about the ethics and usefulness of the dialogue, and it resulted in violent attacks against dialogueros.

== History ==
=== Background ===
The Cuban government of the 1970s was suffering an image problem as various European intellectuals began to disavow the Cuban government they had once supported. The Cuban government became interested in a humanitarian image rather than one of human rights violations, this desire would lead to the eventual release of political prisoners.

In 1977 Cuban exiles organized as the Antonio Maceo Brigade traveled to Cuba to show sympathy for the Cuban government and visit family. The visit brought a bettered image of Cuban exiles in Cuba; no longer were they viewed as totally antagonistic to Cuba.

President Jimmy Carter undertook a human rights-based foreign policy, and explored the idea of the United States bettering their relations with Cuba. The Carter administration ended the United States travel ban to Cuba, and began speaking with Cuban officials via Interest Sections in third party countries. The possibility of improved diplomatic relations with Cuba encouraged some Cuban exiles to publicly support reconciliation with Cuba.

Throughout the 1970s various anti-Castro terrorist groups continued to attack Cuban commercial missions and diplomats outside Cuba. These terrorist groups began to target other Cuban exiles who publicly supported rapprochement with Cuba, notably Cuban exile travel agencies that serviced travel to Cuba.

=== Dialogues ===
Discreet discussions between the United States and Cuba resulted in an agreement to release thousands of political prisoners in August 1978. At the time of the release Jimmy Carter did not want to publicly acknowledge his role in the negotiations. The Cuban government decided to open negotiations with Cuban exiles to better public relations. Originally many Cuban exiles debated the dialogue's usefulness some were satisfied with the invitation while others doubted the sincerity of the negotiations believing it to be a publicity stunt. The Cuban government would eventually state that no prisoners would be released until negotiations took place. Eventually the Comite de los 75 (Committee of 75) would be formed of prominent Cuban exiles and led by Bernardo Benes, they would be the official negotiators with the Cuban government.

The topics of the talks included release of prisoners, family reunification, and the right of exiles to travel back to Cuba. Two talks occurred in November and December 1978.

=== Implementation and effects ===
Political prisoners had begun leaving Cuba in the 21st of October before the first meeting. By early April 1980, the United States had accepted 10,000 Cubans, and more were planned to come in through the U.S. Coordinator of Refugee Affairs. The negotiations also brought thousands of Cuban exiles back to visit Cuba. The visits of these exiles exposed friends and family in Cuba to luxury goods found in the United States. These interactions led to malcontentment and envy across the island. The 1980 Havana Peruvian embassy crisis occurred soon after as Cubans began to demand to leave the island.

In the ensuing Mariel boatlift the Cuban government declined to allow Cuban emigrants to leave via Mariel harbor rather than through the structured path developed by the United States, possibly due to the ideological pushback for the U.S. labeling these emigrants as "refugees".

== See also ==
- Bay of Pigs Invasion
- Cuban thaw
