= Diálogo =

Diálogo is the Spanish word for "dialogue" which may refer to:

== Academia ==
- Diálogo (journal), a journal published at the University of Texas.

== History ==
- El Diálogo, diplomatic talks between Cuba and Cuban exiles in 1979.

== Music ==
- Diálogo?, 2004 album by the band NX Zero.
