= List of Unforgettable episodes =

Unforgettable is an American crime drama series created by Ed Redlich and John Bellucci for CBS, who serves as an executive producer alongside Carl Beverly and Sarah Timberman. It is based on the J. Robert Lennon's short story "The Rememberer". The series stars Poppy Montgomery as Carrie Wells, a former Syracuse, New York police detective, who has hyperthymesia, a rare medical condition that gives her the ability to remember everything. The fourth season of Unforgettable premiered on November 27, 2015 on A&E.

During the course of the series, 61 episodes of Unforgettable aired over four seasons, between September 20, 2011, and January 22, 2016.

== Series overview ==
Season	Episodes	Originally released			Rank	Viewers (in millions)
Season	Episodes	First released	Last released	Network	Rank	Viewers (in millions)
1	22	September 20, 2011	May 8, 2012	CBS	24	12.10
2	13	July 28, 2013	May 9, 2014	CBS	36	9.05
3	13	June 29, 2014	September 14, 2014	CBS	—N/a	—N/a
4	13	November 27, 2015	January 22, 2016	A&E	—N/a	—N/a

== Episodes ==
=== Season 1 (2011–12) ===
No. overall	No. in season	Title	Directed by	Written by	Original release date	U.S. viewers (millions)
1	1	"Pilot"	Niels Arden Oplev	Teleplay by : Ed Redlich & John Bellucci; Story by : Ed Redlich John Bellucci	September 20, 2011	14.09
2	2	"Heroes"	Niels Arden Oplev	Sherri Cooper & Jennifer Levin	September 27, 2011	12.43
3	3	"Check Out Time"	John David Coles	Joan B. Weiss	October 4, 2011	11.58
4	4	"Up In Flames"	Martha Mitchell	Michael Foley & Erik Oleson	October 11, 2011	11.72
5	5	"With Honor"	Peter Werner	Erik Oleson	October 18, 2011	11.88
6	6	"Friended"	Niels Arden Oplev	Sherri Cooper & Jennifer Levin	October 25, 2011	11.25
7	7	"Road Block"	Jean de Segonzac	Teleplay by : Heather Bellson & Christal Henry; Story by : Jan Nash	November 1, 2011	11.34
8	8	"Lost Things"	John Showalter	Jan Nash	November 8, 2011	11.72
9	9	"Golden Bird"	Paul Holahan	Michael Foley	November 15, 2011	11.37
10	10	"Trajectories"	Anna Foerster	Erik Oleson	November 22, 2011	10.42
11	11	"Spirited Away"	Karen Gaviola	Joan B. Weiss	December 13, 2011	11.30
12	12	"Butterfly Effect"	Jace Alexander	Sam Montgomery	January 3, 2012	11.88
13	13	"Brotherhood"	John David Coles	Jim Adler	January 10, 2012	11.20
14	14	"Carrie's Caller"	Aaron Lipstadt	Ed Redlich & John Bellucci	February 7, 2012	11.86
15	15	"The Following Sea"	Oz Scott	Jan Nash & Michael Foley	February 14, 2012	11.03
16	16	"Heartbreak"	Anna J. Foerster	Spencer Hudnut	February 21, 2012	10.70
17	17	"Blind Alleys"	Peter Werner	Erik Oleson & Heather Bellson	February 28, 2012	9.93
18	18	"The Comeback"	Jean de Segonzac	Michael Foley & Christal Henry	March 20, 2012	11.32
19	19	"Allegiances"	Oz Scott	Joan B. Weiss	March 27, 2012	10.51
20	20	"You Are Here"	Jean de Segonzac	Jim Adler	April 10, 2012	9.45
21	21	"Endgame"	Ken Girotti	Jan Nash & Steven Maeda	May 1, 2012	10.66
22	22	"The Man in the Woods"	John David Coles	Ed Redlich & John Bellucci	May 8, 2012	10.84

=== Season 2 (2013–14) ===
No. overall	No. in season	Title	Directed by	Written by	Original release date (Note: Season two episodes 8–13 were broadcast earlier in German speaking countries on Glitz* (Germany).)	U.S. viewers (millions)
23	1	"Bigtime"	Jean de Segonzac	Ed Redlich & John Bellucci	July 28, 2013	7.15
24	3	"Incognito"	Seith Mann	Spencer Hudnut	August 4, 2013	7.10
25	5	"Day of the Jackie"	Paul Holahan	Wendy Battles	August 11, 2013	6.88
26	6	"Memory Kings"	Peter Werner	Sam Montgomery	August 18, 2013	6.57
27	2	"Past Tense"	Matt Earl Beesley	Barry Schindel	August 25, 2013	6.80
28	4	"Line Up or Shut Up"	Peter Werner	Quinton Peeples	September 1, 2013	6.94
29	11	"Maps and Legends"	Jean de Segonzac	Quinton Peeples	September 8, 2013	5.76
30	9	"Till Death"	David Platt	Barry Schkolnick	April 4, 2014	7.32
31	12	"Flesh and Blood"	Oz Scott	Wendy Battles	April 11, 2014	7.59
32	7	"Manhunt"	Jan Eliasberg	Barry Schindel	April 18, 2014	7.17
33	8	"East of Islip"	Rick Bota	Spencer Hudnut	April 25, 2014	7.64
34	10	"Omega Hour"	Jean de Segonzac	Bill Chais	May 2, 2014	7.59
35	13	"Reunion"	Paul Holahan	Bill Chais & John Bellucci	May 9, 2014	7.26

=== Season 3 (2014) ===
No. overall	No. in season	Title	Directed by	Written by	Original release date	U.S. viewers (millions)
36	1	"New Hundred"	Peter Werner	Teleplay by : Ed Decter & Spencer Hudnut; Story by : Ed Decter	June 29, 2014	6.22
37	2	"The Combination"	Matt Earl Beesley	Daniele Nathanson	July 6, 2014	6.20
38	3	"The Haircut"	Matthew Penn	Quinton Peeples	July 13, 2014	6.02
39	4	"Cashing Out"	Jean de Segonzac	Spencer Hudnut	July 20, 2014	6.39
40	5	"A Moveable Feast"	Andy Wolk	Gina Gold & Aurorae Khoo	July 27, 2014	6.45
41	6	"Stray Bullet"	Christine Moore	Barry Schkolnick	August 3, 2014	5.67
42	7	"Throwing Shade"	Paul Holahan	Michael Reisz	August 17, 2014	6.28
43	8	"The Island"	Oz Scott	Michael Reisz	August 24, 2014	6.39
44	9	"Admissions"	Michael Pressman	Sean Crouch	August 30, 2014	4.55
45	10	"Fire and Ice"	Darnell Martin	Teleplay by : Quinton Peeples; Story by : Ed Decter	August 31, 2014	6.02
46	11	"True Identity"	Nick Gomez	Sean Crouch & Daniele Nathanson	September 7, 2014	6.97
47	12	"Moving On"	Paul Holahan	Teleplay by : Spencer Hudnut; Story by : Louisa Hill	September 14, 2014	6.45
48	13	"DOA"	Matt Earl Beesley	Quinton Peeples	September 14, 2014	5.78

=== Season 4 (2015–16) ===
No. overall	No. in season	Title	Directed by	Written by	Original release date	U.S. viewers (millions)
49	1	"Blast from the Past"	Matt Earl Beesley	Teleplay by : Bill Chais; Story by : Ed Redlich & John Bellucci	November 27, 2015	0.84
50	2	"Gut Check"	Jace Alexander	Spencer Hudnut	November 27, 2015	0.71
51	3	"Behind The Beat"	Matt Earl Beesley	Karen Campbell	December 4, 2015	0.92
52	4	"Dollars and Scents"	Paul Holahan	Timothy J. Lea	December 11, 2015	0.94
53	5	"All In"	Jean de Segonzac	Bill Chais & Spencer Hudnut	December 18, 2015	1.01
54	6	"The Return of Eddie"	Paul Holahan	Emmy Grinwis	January 1, 2016	0.74
55	7	"We Can Be Heroes"	Laura Belsey	John P. Roche	January 8, 2016	0.61
56	8	"Breathing Space"	Oz Scott	Louisa Hill	January 15, 2016	0.71
57	9	"Shelter from the Storm"	Andy Wolk	Timothy J. Lea & Karen Campbell	January 15, 2016	0.65
58	10	"Game On"	Kate Woods	Jeff Pfeiffer	January 22, 2016	0.84
59	11	"About Face"	David Platt	Jacob Copithorne	January 22, 2016	0.66
60	12	"Bad Company"	Jamie Sheridan	Bill Chais	January 22, 2016	0.55
61	13	"Paranoid Android"	Matt Earl Beesley	Spencer Hudnut	January 22, 2016	0.49
