= Candace Brightman =

American lighting engineer (born 1944)

Candace Brightman (born 1944) is an American lighting engineer, known for her longtime association with the Grateful Dead. She is the sister of author Carol Brightman.

Brightman grew up in Illinois and studied set design at St John's College, Annapolis, Maryland. She began working as a lighting technician in the Anderson Theater, New York City, and was recruited by Bill Graham to operate lighting at the Fillmore East. In 1970, she operated the house lights at the Chicago Coliseum with Norol Tretiv. She has also worked for Janis Joplin, Joe Cocker and Van Morrison.

After serving as house lighting engineer for several Grateful Dead shows, including their 1971 residency at the Capitol Theatre, Port Chester, she was recruited by the band's Jerry Garcia to work for them full-time. She started working regularly for the Dead on their 1972 tour of Europe (which was recorded and released as Europe 72), and remained their in-house lighting engineer for the remainder of their career. One particular challenge that Brightman faced was having to alter lighting setups immediately in response to the Dead's improvisational style. By the band's final tours in the mid-1990s, she was operating a computer-controlled lighting system and managing a team of technicians. Her work inspired Phish's resident lighting engineer Chris Kuroda, who regularly studied techniques in order to keep up with her standards.

Brightman continued working in related spin-off projects until 2005. She returned to direct the lighting for the Fare Thee Well concerts in 2015, where she used over 500 fixtures.
