= Sandra Levinson =

Director of the Center for Cuban Studies and Cuban Art Space

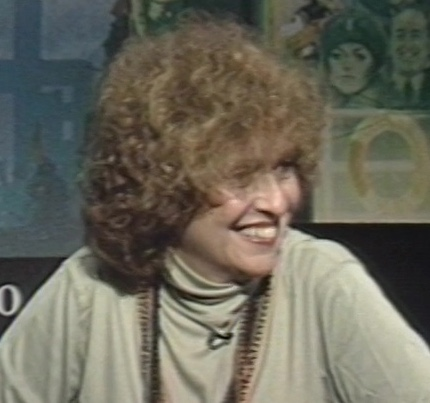
- Levinson on CUNY TV's Cinema Then, Cinema Now, 1989
- Occupations: Executive director and curator
- Years active: 1972 – present
- Known for: The Center for Cuban Studies and the Cuban Art Space
- Notable work: Venceremos Brigade: Young Americans Sharing the Life and Work of Revolutionary Cuba
- Website: centerforcubanstudies.org

Sandra Levinson is the executive director and co-founder of the nonprofit Center for Cuban Studies, and the founder and curator of the Cuban Art Space gallery.

== Early life and education ==
Sandra Levinson is from Mason City, Iowa. She graduated from the University of Iowa and attended the University of Manchester as a Fulbright scholar and Stanford University for her master's degree and doctorate. In 1966, she was the New York Editor for Ramparts, as well as a political science instructor at City College of New York, and residing in Greenwich Village. She was an SDS activist as well as a reporter for Ramparts, and in July 1969, she visited Cuba as part of a group of journalists, including Peter Jennings, and met with Fidel Castro.

== Writing career ==
With Carol Brightman, Levinson co-edited the 1971 book Venceremos Brigade: Young Americans Sharing the Life and Work of Revolutionary Cuba, a collection of writings by a group of volunteers from the United States who cut sugarcane in Cuba, known as the Venceremos Brigade; according to Kirkus Reviews, "Running through all the narratives is the preoccupation with the need to be relevant to 'the revolution' as well as a conscientious emphasis on eradicating vestiges of their own bourgeois individualism". In a review for The American Political Science Review, Patricia W. Fagen writes, "The editors' introduction explains the formulation and organization of the Brigades, and provides a useful and thoughtful analysis of the Brigades' importance to the American left."

Levinson is also a co-editor of the 1979 book The U.S. Blockade: A Documentary History, published by the Center for Cuban Studies, and her writing is published in several collections: The Cuba Reader: The Making of a Revolutionary Society, A Contemporary Cuba Reader: The Revolution under Raúl Castro, and The Cuba Reader: History, Culture, Politics.

== Center for Cuban Studies ==
In May 1972, Levinson co-founded the Center for Cuban Studies (CCS) as a nonprofit educational organization with Saul Landau and Lee Lockwood. The mission of the organization includes opposition to the United States embargo against Cuba and support for the normalization of relations through educational programs, including tours to Cuba. In March 1973, while Levinson was working as the director at the CCS office in Greenwich Village, a bomb detonated in the building. Despite extensive property damage, no one was injured, and Levinson continued to lead the CCS. In 2007, she recalled, "Instead of making me leave, it only made me more furious".

In 1984, Levinson spoke with the Wall Street Journal about the impact of the embargo on the Cuban economy, stating, "The old cars are the most obvious sign. It's the same with the factories. The whole phone system is obsolete. You can hardly find a copying machine, and when you do it probably doesn't work because they can't get the spare parts they need." In 1995, she advocated for businesses in the United States to oppose the economic embargo of Cuba, and told The Oregonian, "It was businesspeople who brought about the ending of the embargo in Vietnam," and "If businesspeople really get behind ending the embargo in Cuba, it will happen." In 2013, Levinson told The Atlantic, "We should be thinking about the embargo in terms of U.S. citizens' rights to travel where they want".

=== Cuba tours ===
In 1973, the CCS began sponsoring tours to Cuba. Initially, the CCS coordinated educational trips to Cuba from the United States for academics, which helped overcome travel restrictions imposed by the United States and Cuba. As travel restrictions eased under the Obama administration to include "people-to-people" visits that allow organizations to sponsor individuals for educational visits, more travel programs were able to be developed by the CCS.

=== Cuban Art Space ===
In 1991, Levinson was a plaintiff in a lawsuit brought by the National Emergency Civil Liberties Committee against the United States Treasury Department and Office of Foreign Assets Control, which led to the lifting of restrictions on the importation of Cuban art. In 1999, she founded the Cuban Art Space art gallery as part of the CCS, with regular exhibitions, and by 2016, its collection included over 10,000 Cuban works of art, including sculpture and paintings, with most of the collection imported directly by Levinson.

CCS also developed the Lourdes Casal Library, which by 2007, held a collection of post-1959 materials from Cuba, including books, magazines, and newspapers.

== Works ==
- Levinson, Sandra; Brightman, Carol, eds. (1971). Venceremos Brigade: Young Americans sharing the life and work of revolutionary Cuba. Simon and Schuster. ISBN 9780671208820.
- Hoeffel, Paul; Levinson, Sandra, eds. (1979). The U.S. Blockade: A Documentary History. Center for Cuban Studies. ASIN B0027JXCFW.
- Sandra Levinson (1988). "Talking about Cuban Culture: A Reporter's Notebook". In Brenner, Phillip; LeoGrande, William M.; Rich, Donna; Seigel, Daniel (eds.). The Cuba Reader: The Making of a Revolutionary Society. Grove/Atlantic. ISBN 9780802110107.
- Sandra Levinson (2014). "Nationhood and Identity in Contemporary Cuban Art". In Brenner, Philip; Jiménez, Marguerite Rose; Kirk, John M.; LeoGrande, William M. (eds.). A Contemporary Cuba Reader: The Revolution under Raúl Castro. Rowman & Littlefield Publishers. ISBN 978-1-4422-3098-9.
- Sandra Levinson (2019). "The Venceremos Brigades". In Prieto, Alfredo; Chomsky, Aviva; Carr, Barry; Smorkaloff, Pamela Maria (eds.). The Cuba Reader: History, Culture, Politics. Duke University Press. ISBN 9781478004561.

== Personal life ==
Levinson has visited Cuba more than 300 times. During her time in Cuba, she learned to dance.
