= Miami Mafia =

Political label applied to Cuban exiles

The Miami Mafia is a disparaging description of Cuban exiles often used by Cuban officials and others. The notion considers many Cuban exiles to be organized in an effort to overthrow the Cuban government and economy.

The notion of a "Miami Mafia" was popularized in Cuba after the 1996 shootdown of Brothers to the Rescue aircraft. In the following decade, revolutionary nationalism was promoted by the Cuban government to explain threats and to boost public morale during national crises. This sense of nationalism encompassed heated denouncements of internal opposition, the United States, and Cuban exiles, who were now insultingly titled "the Miami Mafia".

== History ==
In 1992, the Cuban government legalized the creation of non-governmental organizations, however many that were created were often controlled by the Cuban state. Later, independent professional organizations were formed, and in October of 1995, 135 of these groups united in a massive umbrella organization named Concilio Cubano, which demanded a peaceful transition to democracy. On February 24, 1996, the Concilio Cubano planned to have a general meeting, but were interrupted by state security, who arrested members, and accused them of being funded by the CIA and the "Miami Mafia".

Historian Rafael Rojas contents that after the 1996 shootdown of Brothers to the Rescue aircraft, and the Communist Party congress a year later, nationalist rhetoric became a mainstay in political speeches; often condemning the United States and the "Miami Mafia".

In 1998, the U.S. government arrested five Cubans living in Miami, accused them of being unregistered foreign agents, and spying on the U.S. government. The five were accused of heavily spying on the Brothers to the Rescue organization in Miami, and found guilty of espionage in a U.S. court. In Cuba, the five were considered to have only been spying on the "Miami Mafia" and were innocent on charges of spying on the government.

During the Elian Gonzalez affair, Castro addressed the Cuban public during a massive "Free Elian" rally in February 2000. At the rally, Castro took an oath of war against U.S. policy on Cuba, and named his enemies as Bill Clinton and the "Miami Mafia".

== Analysis ==
=== Diffusion ===
While the notion of a "Miami Mafia" was developed in Cuba, it has reverberated in the United States, including in differing political spheres.

Scholar Crystal Parikh has stated that the "Miami Mafia" conception of Cuban exiles as uniformly right-wing and politically influential has been embraced by both the right-wing and the left-wing in the United States. This image of Cuban exiles is apparently embraced by the right-wing to serve as a sort of model minority myth for Cuban Americans, and by left-wing sympathizers of Cuba, to portray Cuban Americans as enemies which leftists can model themselves against.

Scholar Irving Louis Horowitz has stated that during the Elian Gonzalez affair, Americans that desired Gonzalez's return to Cuba, could portray Cuban exile activists that desired for Gonzalez to stay, as overly zealous outsiders, and part of the annoyingly influential "Miami Mafia"; ultimately adopting the stereotype developed in Cuba.

=== Criticism ===
Latin American studies scholar María de los Angeles Torres has argued that the demonization of the "Miami Mafia" by Fidel Castro during the Elian Gonzalez affair, put focus on external enemies while conveniently ignoring the internal problems that caused Gonzalez's exit from Cuba.

Scholars Ted Henken, Miriam Celaya, Dimas Castellanos have written that the labeling of Cuban exiles as the "Miami Mafia" is completely done opportunistically. The generalizing label is used only for Cuban exiles who are considered enemies, while more positive terms like "butterflies" are used for exiles visiting Cuba with remittances to support Cuban locals. According to these scholars, the differing conceptions of the Cuban diaspora are utilized by the government on a self-serving basis.

Historian Lillian Guerra has stated that the idea of a "Miami Mafia" implies a sort of secretive political and organizational unity, which by no accounts exists amongst Cuban exiles. Guerra adds that the promise of freedom of thought is often a draw for Cubans to emigrate from Cuba, and thus accusations of ideological uniformity amongst diasporic Cubans can be insulting.

== See also ==
- Scottish mafia
- Gusano
