= Carol Brightman =

American author (1939–2019)

- Born: October 5, 1939; Baltimore, Maryland US
- Died: November 11, 2019 (aged 80); Damariscotta, Maine US
- Education: A.B., Vassar College; M.A., University of Chicago
- Occupation: Author
- Children: 2
- Family: Candace Brightman (sister)
- Awards: National Book Critics Circle Biography/Autobiography Award

Carol Deborah Morton Brightman (October 5, 1939 – November 11, 2019) was an American author. Her 1992 biography Writing Dangerously: Mary McCarthy and Her World received the 1992 National Book Critics Circle Biography/Autobiography Award.

== Early life and education ==
Brightman was born on October 5, 1939, to parents Carl Gordon Brightman Jr. and Lucille Caroline (Hancock) Brightman in Baltimore, Maryland. Growing up in Illinois, Brightman attended and graduated from New Trier High School before enrolling in Vassar College and earning her Master's degree from the University of Chicago.

== Career ==
While working as a graduate assistant in English at New York University in 1965, Brightman co-founded a periodical titled Viet-Report. The periodical was intended to fight against misinformation during the Vietnam War. Two years later, she partook in the Russell Tribunal and co-founded the Leviathan, a New Left radical underground newspaper. She also served as a leader for the Venceremos Brigade and co-edited a book of writings by the participants with Sandra Levinson titled Venceremos Brigade: Young Americans Sharing the Life and Work of Revolutionary Cuba (1971). As her activism work slowly died down, she taught at Brooklyn College and was an associate editor at Geo magazine. In 1987, Brightman, her partner Michael Uhl, and their son moved to Maine for an article she was writing for Geo magazine. Brightman and Uhl eventually decided to live in Maine full-time after renovating a farmhouse on Carl Bailey road.

In 1992, Brightman published Writing Dangerously: Mary McCarthy and Her World, which received the 1992 National Book Critics Circle Biography/Autobiography Award. The biography was focused on the life of author Mary McCarthy from birth to her death in 1989. She later edited correspondence between Hannah Arendt and Mary McCarthy into a book titled Between Friends: The Correspondence of Hannah Arendt and Mary McCarthy 1949-1975. The following year, she received an American Academy of Arts and Letters Award in Literature.

While living in Maine, Brightman remained connected with her younger sister Candace who worked with the Grateful Dead as their lighting director and literary agent. This led her to pen her second book, titled Sweet Chaos, which consisted of interviews with the band members, Carolyn Garcia, and Robert Hunter. Although Sweet Chaos was centered around the Grateful Dead, Brightman also examined the exterior factors which led to the band's popularity, including the Free Speech Movement, Vietnam, the Cuban Revolution, and the Weatherman. However, Sweet Chaos was occasionally mislisted as “Fat Trip,” a previously rejected title, causing it to be marketed as a diet book.

Brightman died on November 11, 2019, in Damariscotta, Maine.

== Selected publications ==
- Drawings and Digressions(1979)
- Writing Dangerously: Mary McCarthy and Her World (1992)
- Between Friends: The Correspondence of Hannah Arendt and Mary McCarthy 1949–1975 (1995)
- Sweet Chaos (1999)
