= New Cuban man =

Guevarist ideal for revolutionary subjects

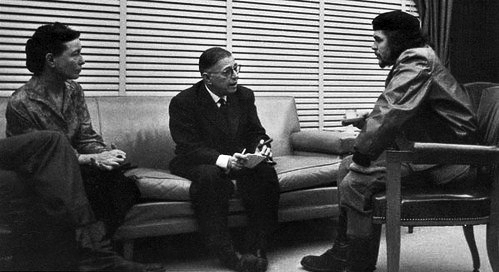
Simone de Beauvoir and Jean-Paul Sartre speaking with Che Guevara. All promoters of selflessness as a revolutionary ideal.

The new Cuban man is the conceptualized "new man" model citizen described by Che Guevara, to be embodied by the citizens of Cuba. This model citizen was envisioned to be generally selfless; tirelessly working for little reward other than the greater good of developing socialism. The promotion of the new Cuban man occurred alongside growing arguments from Guevara, that Cuba did not need the "objective conditions" for developing socialism, as ascribed by Soviet economists, but instead that socialism could be constructed by promoting what Guevara often simply called conciencia (lit: "consciousness"), a self-sacrificial socialist mentality. Guevara frequently argued that moral incentive would inspire Cuban workers to produce more, and that material rewards like extra pay were unnecessary.

The conceptualization of the new Cuban man as a selfless and strong revolutionary, became a justification for Cuban homophobia, as during the 1960s, homosexuality in Cuba was seen as a weakness and a capitalist disposition, thus homosexuals were considered to be innately failing to live up to the ideal of the new man as a strong socialist revolutionary. The legal implementation of moral incentives in the Cuban economy, as per the "new man" philosophy, has also consistently led to economic inefficiency in Cuba, as moral incentives usually do not promote extra-labor as intended.

== Theory ==
=== National implementation ===
According to Guevara, a Cuban citizen could be transformed into a "new man", by adjusting the citizen's ethical relationship to the world. Self-education, conscious reflection, and new knowledge would assist in the transformation of citizens into "new men", and could rapidly be done by changing a society's folklore, popular ideology, and national history, so as to better promote selflessness as an ethical virtue. Cultural criticism was thus an important step in remolding culture into one which valued selflessness.

In education policy, the promotion of the "new man" would be of highest importance in schools. Marxism–Leninism was mandated to be taught to Cuban schoolchildren, as well as a history of Cuba which frames the island as existing in one long continuous struggle for liberty. Through these lessons, Cuban schoolchildren were expected to become more selfless and radical in consciousness.

In broader society, the veterans of the Cuban Revolution were to serve as the public models of "new men" for Cuban citizens, with Che Guevara as a sort of supreme example. The veterans were the promoted as the "vanguard of the vanguard", and the combat they faced in the Sierra Maestra was considered the original "school of the New Man".

In economic policy, the transition to an economy of "new men", would be done by slowly phasing out material incentives for extra-work, and slowly phasing in moral incentives. Guevara proposes multiple strategies for this gradual transition. One strategy is by glorifying extra-productive workers, by offering them trophies and other congratulatory ceremonies, but not giving them extra pay. Another strategy of Guevara's is offering extra-productive workers with a reward that is a qualitative reward, which goes beyond money, like a free education. This education might allow the worker to perhaps one day work a better paying job, but would also allow them to intellectually develop into a more selfless human being. The other strategy outlined by Guevara, is that of offering extra-productive workers collective rewards. These are rewards that are not individualistic, but benefit the whole workplace, like a new dining hall, or other shared amenities.

=== Nuclear war ===
Biographers of Che Guevara, Eric Luther and Ted Henken, have connected Guevara's "new man" ideal with Guevara's ideas for embracing sacrifice in nuclear war. Starting in 1960, Guevara began declaring that nuclear war should not be a fear of the Cuban people, since the sacrifice of nuclear annihilation will ultimately bring about socialist victory. Luther and Henken view both Guevara's "new man" concept, and the embrace of nuclear annihilation, as an overarching vision by Guevara for mass self-sacrifice, celebrated selflessness, and anti-individualistic collectivism.

=== Rapid transition to socialism ===
Guevara often criticized pro-Soviet economists, who estimated that Cuba was not ready for a transition to socialism. Many of the economists of the Popular Socialist Party in Cuba, like Carlos Rafael Rodríguez, argued that Cuba was in a "semi-feudal" stage of development, and that a gradual transition to a capitalist stage was necessary for a later transition to socialism.

In contrast, according to Guevara, the implementation of moral incentives, and the nourishing of "new man" consciousness, would allow Cuba to rapidly transition to socialism, without the necessary economic "objective" conditions as prescribed by Marxist theory. This campaign of consciousness raising, and rapid transition to socialism, would be guided by a highly dedicated vanguard which would oversee the entirety of a nationalized economy, and turn the country into "one huge school" of political education.

This theory was Guevara's self-described "contribution to Marxism-Leninism", and also the theory which he then used to criticize the Soviet Union's style of Marxism–Leninism, for not fully embracing moral incentives in its economy.

== History ==
=== Origins ===
In February 1960, philosophers Simone de Beauvoir, and Jean-Paul Sartre, visited Cuba to meet personally with Che Guevara, an admirer of Sartre's existentialist philosophy. During his stay, Sartre wrote about the tireless work-ethic of Che Guevara, viewing it as a sort of "freedom" from worldly restraints. Sartre published the essay Ideology and Revolution during his stay in Cuba, in which Sartre comments that the Cuban revolutionaries had redefined "the very notion of man". De Beauvoir wrote in praise of the selfless devotion of the Cuban citizenry in defending their new government.

In August 1960, Guevara gave a speech to a crowd of Cuban medics in which he suggests that the only way for "the revolution" to succeed is by creating a "new man". In a variety of speeches made by Guevara from 1960 to 1965, Guevara continuously suggested at creating a new humanist-socialist citizen. After many public proclamations calling for the creation of a "new man", Guevara put his ideas into writing, publishing Socialism and man in Cuba in 1965.

=== Guanahacabibes camp ===
Che Guevara established a labor camp in the Guanahacabibes Peninsula of Cuba, in 1960 It was intended to be a facility for Che's employees in his ministry. If an employee made some sort of infraction, they could decide to work at Guanahacabibes in return for employment amnesty. If the employee did not want to go to Guanahacabibes, they'd be fired for their infraction.

Many economic managers who were sent to the Guanahacabibes camp often viewed their stay as a test of one's stamina as a revolutionary. Guevara often visited the camp, and spoke with his underlings to make sure they understood the nature of their punishment, and the value of work as a revolutionary moral goal.

=== Four Year Plan ===
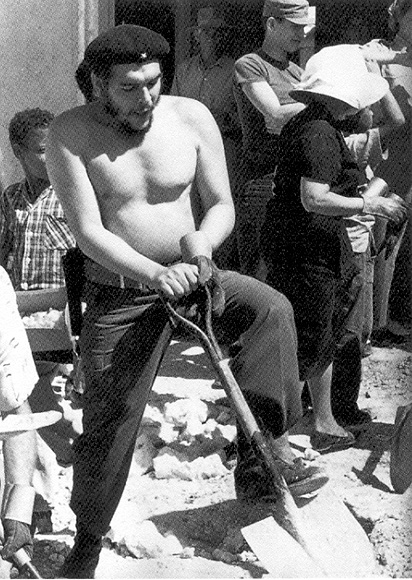
Che working in Cuba, 1962

Che Guevara announced in 1961 a Four Year Plan to double the living standards of Cuba mostly using the voluntaristic promotion of labor. Guevara introduced the policy of "socialist emulation" to build momentum for labor. The policy awarded exemplary workers with honorary monikers and trophies, but did not reward extra work with extra pay.

In September 1961, Castro publicly complained that industrialization had stalled because of lazy uncooperative workers. In March 1962, Guevara admitted in a speech that the economic plan was a failure, specifically stating it was "an absurd plan, disconnected from reality, with absurd goals and imaginary resources." The failure of the industrialization plan had immediate impacts by 1962. In that year, Cuba introduced a rationing system for food, In general, the Four Year Plan failed to rapidly shift the Cuban economy from being mainly agricultural to mainly industrial, and the use of moral incentives for extra-labor led to a rise in absenteeism at workplaces.

=== Great Debate ===
The Great Debate was an era in Cuban history retroactively named by historians, that was defined by public debate about the future of Cuban economic policy that took place from 1962 to 1965. The debate began after Cuba fell into an economic crisis in 1962 after years of internal economic complications, United States sanctions, and the flight of professionals from Cuba. In 1962 Fidel Castro invited Marxist economists around the world to debate two main propositions. One proposition proposed by Che Guevara was that Cuba could bypass any capitalist then "socialist" transition period and immediately become an industrialized "communist" society if "subjective conditions" like public consciousness and vanguard action are perfected. The other proposition held by the Popular Socialist Party was that Cuba required a transitionary period as a mixed economy in which Cuba's sugar economy was maximized for profit before a "communist" society could be established.

The Great Debate would result in somewhat of a compromise in which Fidel Castro used moral incentives rather than material incentives to motivate workers, and industrialization would be ignored in favor of a focus on the sugar economy. These policies would eventually culminate in the Revolutionary Offensive where the economy would be oriented in producing 10 million tons of sugar by 1970. The campaign failed and led to a reorientation of domestic Cuban politics.

=== Revolutionary Offensive ===
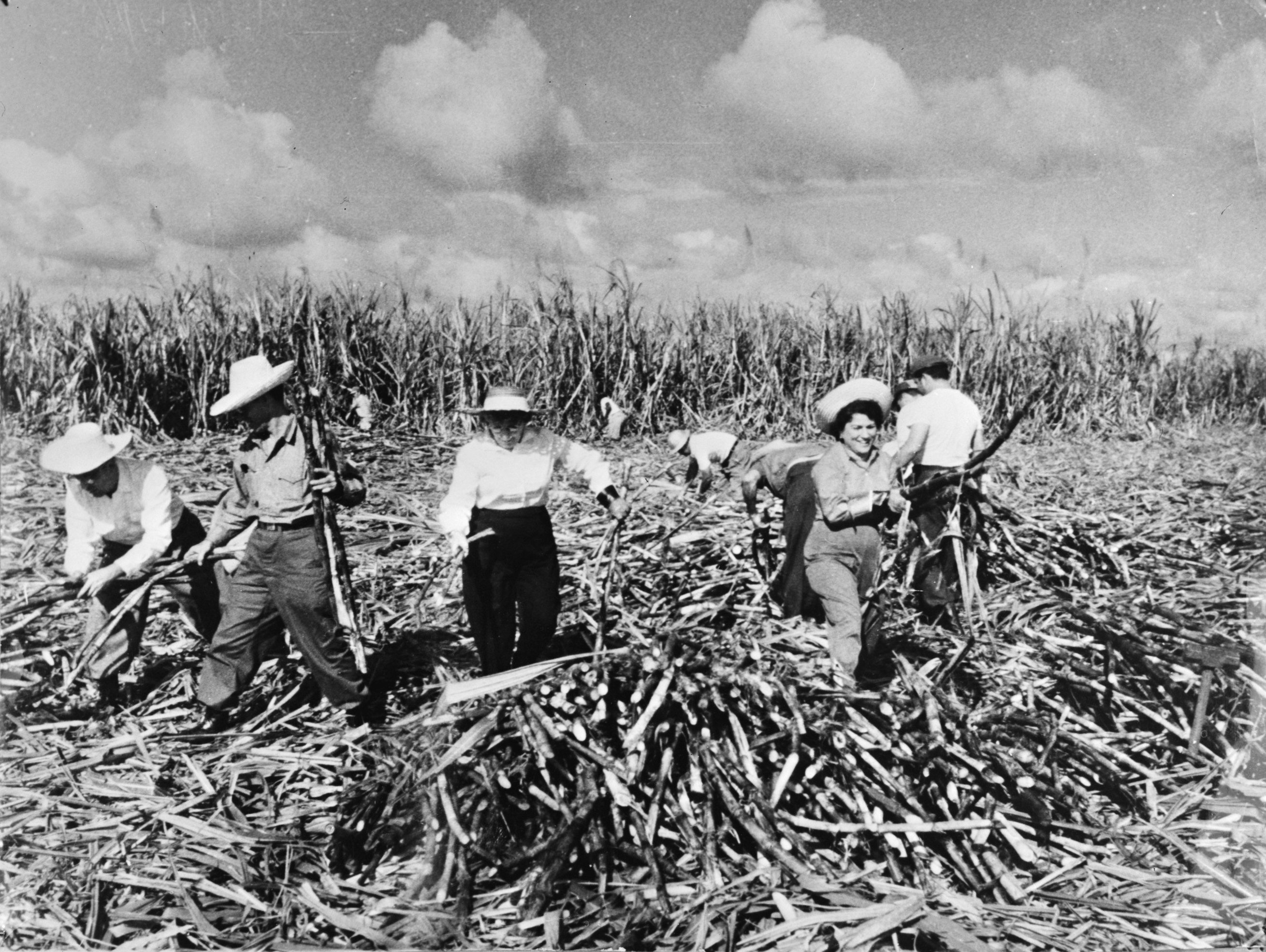
Cuban sugar-cutters working for the 1970 sugar harvest.

The Guevarist theory that personal will could triumph over material deficiencies, led to the Revolutionary Offensive of 1968. The campaign would spur industrialization in Cuba and focus the economy on sugar production, specifically to a deadline for an annual sugar harvest of 10 million tons by 1970. The economic focus on sugar production involved international volunteers and the mobilization of workers from all sectors of the Cuban economy. Economic mobilization also coincided with greater militarization of Cuban political structures and society in general.

The implementation of the new Cuban man in policy, resulted in the usage of moral incentives to promote productivity in the sugar harvest, which eventually led to the failure of the 10 million ton harvest goal in 1970.

=== Schools in the countryside ===
The "schools in the countryside" were established in 1971 as full-time boarding schools, done with the intent to fully realize the development of Cuban "new men". By totally socializing children away from the home, educators could separate children from places were they could possibly be taught "pre-revolutionary values". Students were to spend half their day studying and the other half working in agriculture. This attention to labor would in theory imbed in students a love for work and collective projects.

The schools were intended to be self-sufficient, using the crops grown by students for financial support, but this model often faltered, causing schools in the countryside to necessitate state funding. By the 2000s, most boarding schools had been phased out in Cuba, except for a select few which are reserved for exceptional athletes or gifted students.

== Legacy ==
Anthropologists Igor Cherstich and Martin Holbraad claim that as of 2020 many Cuban citizens still regard their economic struggles as personal sacrifices that must be made for the continuation of the revolution. The language of self-sacrifice remains prevalent in Cuba, and there is a sense that the Cuban state is a collective political project rather than a system of management by one class over another.
