= National Emergency Civil Liberties Committee =

United States advocacy group

The National Emergency Civil Liberties Committee (NECLC), until 1968 known as the Emergency Civil Liberties Committee, was an organization formed in the United States in October 1951 by 150 educators and clergymen to advocate for the civil liberties embodied in the Bill of Rights of the U.S. Constitution, notably the rights of free speech, religion, travel, and assembly. Though it solicited contributions, its program and policy decisions were controlled by a self-perpetuating national council for most of its first 20 years.

== Founding and mission ==
It was formed by civil rights advocates who disagreed with the decision of the American Civil Liberties Union (ACLU) not to participate directly in the defense of people charged with violations of the McCarran Act (1950) by advocating the overthrow of the U.S. government.

Corliss Lamont later wrote: "It was felt that other organizations were not as vigorous in their defense of civil liberties as they might have been." The ACLU restricted its role in such cases to submitting amicus curiae briefs, while the NECLC participated directly in the defense of those charged. In the 1960s, the NECLC's director, Henry di Suvero, explained how he thought its mission differed from that of the ACLU: "A.C.L.U. takes only clear cases of violations of civil liberties. We take cases that are not so clear." He had left the ACLU because he wanted greater involvement in progressive causes in addition to classic civil rights issues. In the view of one ACLU official, the NECLC made a more direct contribution to the cause of civil liberties in its McCarran Act cases, but its close association with the defendants invited suspicion that the NECLC was itself a Communist-backed organization. Di Suvero responded that the NECLC had learned the importance of avoiding identification with a single cause and therefore looked for cases involving students, prisoners, and the poor. Red-baiting continued for decades. In 1971, after a congressman called NECLC chairman Corliss Lamont an "identified member of the Communist Party, U.S.A." and said the NECLC was "controlled" by Communists, Lamont issued a statement that "although it is no disgrace to belong to the Communist party, I have never even dreamed of joining it." He said the NECLC "is strictly nonpartisan and defends the civil liberties of all Americans, no matter what may be their political or economic viewpoint."

Clark Foreman, a former administrator of New Deal programs and in 1948 treasurer of the Wallace for President Committee, served as the director of the NECLC from 1951 to 1968.

== McCarthy Era ==
In 1953, the American Committee for Cultural Freedom, headed by executive director Irving Kristol, called the NECLC "a "Communist front with no sincere interest in liberty in the United States or elsewhere" in telegrams to several sponsors of an NECLC public forum. Two of the sponsors withdrew, including theologian Paul Tillich, who said he was unable to ascertain the truth of the charge. The NECLC replied: "We are opposed to communism and other authoritarian movements. We are committed to civil liberties as a bulwark of American democratic strength at home and abroad."

Another case was handled by Clark Foreman in testimony before the House Un-American Activities Committee in June 1956. In this testimony, he was interrogated about Paul Robeson who he defended to obtain a passport which the State Department denied him since he was an accused communist. In his testimony, Clark Foreman admitted knowing Alger Hiss, a controversial accused communist.

Its first landmark case was Kent v. Dulles (1958), argued by Leonard Boudin, in which the Supreme Court ruled that the right to travel may not be restricted without due process.

== After McCarthy ==
After the McCarthy era, the organization won a number of high-profile civil rights cases. In 1965, it won a decision that the McCarran Act's requirement that members of the Communist Party register with the U.S. government as agents of a foreign power violated the Fifth Amendment of the U.S. constitution. In 1965, it won Corliss Lamont's challenge to a law requiring those who wished to receive Communist publications from foreign countries though the U.S. mail to file a request with the Post Office.

In 1968, to determine "the constitutional rights of juveniles in public schools", it backed the right of an 11-year-old school student to circulate a petition calling for the removal of his school principal. It objected to attempts to bar girls from wearing pants to school as well.

== Relaunch ==
In 1968, the NECLC reorganized as a membership organization, with the members controlling the organization's policies. It hoped to attract ACLU members dissatisfied with that organization's less radical posture, notably its hesitant approach to advocacy in cases involving the draft and anti-war protests.

Around the same time it launched a project to challenge the all-white jury system in certain Southern states.

In March 1976, NECLC represented James Peck, a young Freedom Rider who had been beaten unconscious by the Ku Klux Klan in Birmingham, Alabama, in 1961. Peck sued the FBI for knowing about the likelihood of an attack and failing to prevent it. Disputes over access to government documents lasted for years. He won a $25,000 judgment in 1983.

In the 1980s, the NECLC successfully represented a Pennsylvania child welfare worker who had exposed the illegal practices of his employers in Prochaska v. Pediaczko (1981). After the U.S. Department of State denied a visa to Hortensia Allende, the widow of assassinated Chilean president Salvador Allende, in 1983, the NCLC won decisions in U.S. District Court and in the First Circuit Court of Appeals in 1988 that the government's action violated the Immigration and Nationality Act of 1952.

In June 1990, the NECLC file suit against the Department of the Treasury which was continuing to ban the importation of paintings, drawings and sculpture from Cuba, despite exemptions provided for "informational materials" in the Free Trade in Ideas Act of 1988. Plaintiffs included Sandra Levinson, director of the Center for Cuban Studies, Dore Ashton, professor of art history at Cooper Union, and Mario Salvadori, professor emeritus of architecture and engineering at Columbia University. The Treasury modified its regulations in response to the suit on April 1, 1991.

In 1998, the NECLC merged into the Center for Constitutional Rights.

== Awards ==
On December 13, 1963, the NECLC presented Bob Dylan its Tom Paine Award for Civil Rights efforts at the Hotel Americana in New York City.
