= Lourdes Casal =

Cuban poet and activist

- 1975
- Born: 5 April 1938; Havana, Cuba
- Died: February 1, 1981 (aged 42); Havana, Cuba
- Education: New School for Social Research
- Occupation: Writer/Social Activist

Lourdes Casal (April 5, 1938 – February 1, 1981) was a Cuban poet and activist who initially supported but then opposed the Cuban Revolution and emigrated to the United States. Casal received a master's degree in psychology in 1962 and later, a doctorate in 1975 from the New School for Social Research. She wrote the book El caso Padilla: literatura y revolucion en Cuba, about the difficult relationship between Cuban writers and officials, and co-founded a journal named Nueva Generación which focused on creating dialogue between Cubans living abroad and in Cuba.

Casal worked with the Central Intelligence Agency during the 1960s, but in the early 1970s she became supportive of the Cuban government. She returned to visit Cuba in 1973 and subsequently organized dialogue between Cuban exiles in the United States and Fidel Castro, which led to the release of thousands of Cuban prisoners.

She was the first Cuban-American to receive the Casa de las Américas Prize, which was awarded to her posthumously in 1981.

== Early life ==
Lourdes Emilia de la Caridad Casal y Valdés was born on April 5, 1938, in Havana to Emilia Valdés, a teacher, and Pedro Casal, a dentist and physician. Her family was of mixed-racial descent, including African, Chinese, and Spanish ancestry. She was privately educated until 1951, when she entered Institute No. 2 in El Vedado. She graduated in 1954 with a bachelor's degree in science and letters, with the simultaneous certification as a land appraiser and surveyor. Furthering her studies, Casal enrolled in St. Thomas of Villanova Catholic University (Villanova), pursuing a degree in chemical engineering. She became the editor of several publications while studying, including Memoria and Revista Insula, as well as a regular contributor to the newspaper El Quibú. She joined the Cultural Association and served as its secretary general and became president of the women's section of the Catholic Youth Organization, (Spanish: Femenino de la Juventud Universitaria Católica (JUC)) of Villanova. She won the second prize in the literary competition of the 1956-1957 academic term with a paper on the work of Father Félix Varela, which led her to change academic direction the following term and enroll in the school of psychology.

As Cuba radicalized, Casal became involved with the Catholic elements of the 26th of July Movement, participating with other students from Villanova. She was active in the anti-Batista Student Revolutionary Directorate (Spanish: Directorio Revolucionario Estudiantil (DRE)) and like other members within the group, switched sides after the Cuban Revolution to oppose what they saw as a betrayal of the revolutionary ideals. She worked briefly in the counter-revolutionary movement in Cuba, but in 1962 was forced into exile. As a director in the Cuban Revolutionary Council (Spanish: Consejo Revolucionario Cubano), she toured Africa on a trip financed by the CIA, collecting information on the continent and publishing an account of her experiences in Cuba Nueva.

== Career ==
=== Professorship ===
Settling in New York in 1962, Casal enrolled in psychology courses at the New School for Social Research and completed her master's degree in 1962. She taught at the City University of New York and simultaneously began a prolific writing career. Her works focused on her need to understand people; she analyzed topics in literature, politics, and the social sciences. Casal later moved to Rutgers University and then in 1969 co-founded the university's Institute for Cuban Studies. She also taught at Dominican College of Blauvelt. Casal's scholarly works primarily were written in English, while her literary works were written in Spanish, an aspect that has .

=== Writings ===
Casal wrote many poems and articles about Cuba and explored identity as a person in exile. In her poetry, she examined how being an exile had changed her life, on one hand making her no longer only Cuban, but on the other realizing that she would never fully be a New Yorker. Racial and social inequality, the suppressive politics of both her homeland and adopted home, and struggle to understand changed Casal from an opponent of the Cuban government to a supporter in the early 1970s. In 1971, she began compiling documents to explore the arrest of the poet Heberto Padilla, and her book El Caso Padilla became a pivotal point reflecting her changing her stance on Castro. She co-founded two journals: Nueva Generación (1972), which aimed to critically explore both positive and negative effects of the Cuban regime and Areíto (1974), which was openly supportive of the Cuban state.

=== Travel to Cuba and Castro advocacy ===
In 1973, she became the first U.S.-based exile from Cuba to return to the country. Being invited by the government to return was at the time a novel event, as the government stance had branded those who left as betrayers of the revolution. She stayed from May to September and from that point forward became an outspoken advocate of the Cuban government. At times her advocacy was seen as dividing the Cuban exile community, but both her ability to maintain her position and allow opposition voices gained the overall respect of the diaspora.

Casal was awarded the Cintas Fellowship in 1974 and completed her PhD from the New School for Social Research in 1975. In the mid-seventies, she research the issue of racism and its cultural context, such as the difference of being mulatto in Cuba compared to black in the United States. In 1973, she wrote Los Fundadores: Alfonso y Otros Cuentos (The Founders: Alfonso and Other Stories) which discussed the history of Chinese Cubans. She co-wrote the book The Cuban Minority in the United States with Rafael Prohias in 1974, comparing the differing experiences of white and black Cuban immigrants in terms of their "success."

In 1977, Casal began work on the Antonio Maceo Brigade, a project aimed at reuniting young Cuban-Americans with the island. At its inception, Casal believed that the group should be composed of those who were either Cuban-born or born to Cuban parents who left Cuba when the revolution began. When President Jimmy Carter agreed to allow a selected group of Cuban exiles to return in 1978, Casal assisted in drafting the list of participants. The meeting, which became known as "The Dialogue" (Spanish: El Diálogo) brought members of the Cuban diaspora to Havana to discuss topics of interest with Cuban officials. The members of the Brigade were born mostly in the United States or Puerto Rico and were allowed to return to Cuba as a result of "The Dialogue". The Cuban government welcomed and accepted these former exiles, using different forms of propaganda that catered to them. In addition to allowing separated families to reunite, "The Dialogue" resulted in the release of "thirty-six hundred political prisoners".

Beginning in 1977, Casal, who was diabetic, began to experience renal dysfunction and was compelled to begin dialysis treatment. Though she continued making trips to and from Cuba in her attempts to serve as a bridge between Cubans and Cuban-Americans, her health declined. In 1980, she participated in a conference in Cuba as part of the activities of the Institute for Cuban Studies, which was held as the Mariel boatlift was unfolding. Soon after the conference, she decided to return permanently to Cuba.

=== Casal and sexuality ===
Casal did not openly address her lesbianism. In Casal’s youth and throughout her life, Cuba had staunch anti-homosexual policies and attitudes. In 1961, a raid on Havana was conducted to search for and detain those suspected of hedonism, which included those who were homosexual. This raid and other raids like it resulted in violence against LGBTQ+ people in Cuba. Even though homosexuality was persecuted against, Casal did not criticize this persecution or the Cuban government. In Cuban revolutionary politics, the idea of being homosexual and a revolutionary seemed to be impossible. Hiding ones' sexuality was a common practice for many members of the Revolution, including those who occupied higher ranks within the government. Casal believed the suppression of her homosexuality to be a necessary price to pay in order to feel connected to Cuba. She aimed not to become a further target for those who opposed her writing and activism.

== Legacy ==
Casal died on February 1, 1981, aged 42 in Havana from complications of her illnesses. Her final work, Polabras juntan revolución (Words Join Revolution) received the Casa de las Américas Prize, posthumously shortly after her death. The impact she had on Cubans internationally left an important legacy for having begun the conversation between Cuban politicians and refugees through both her writing and advocacy. Her stance on reconciliation between the diaspora and Cuban politicians and support of the regime, impacted her status as an exile and for a period of time, and she was consequently omitted from Cuban-American literature compilations. A reawakening of her legacy coincided with talks of normalization of the US–Cuban relationship at the turn of the 21st century.

== See also ==
- Cuban American literature
- List of Cuban-American writers
