= Concilio Cubano =

Defunct network of pro-democracy groups in Cuba

- Formation: October 1995
- Dissolved: February 1996 (4 months)
- Purpose: Pro-democracy
- Official language: Spanish

Concilio Cubano was a network of pro-democracy groups in Cuba which pushed for a peaceful transition to democracy. It was founded in October 1995.

The Cuban government realised the existence of Concilio Cubano in February 1996.
