= Venceremos Brigade =

Cuba solidarity travel organization

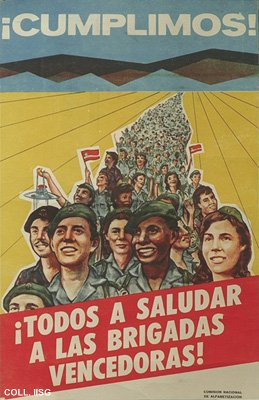
- Cuban propaganda poster welcoming brigadistas to the island
- Formation: 1969
- Type: Political organization
- Purpose: Solidarity with Cuba
- Location: United States
- Services: Travel to Cuba
- Fields: Volunteer labor
- Key people: Carl Oglesby (Creator); Bernardine Dohrn (Director)
- Parent organization: Students for a Democratic Society
- Affiliations: Antonio Maceo Brigade (inspired)
- Website: vb4cuba.com

The Venceremos Brigade is an international organization founded in 1969 by members of the Students for a Democratic Society (SDS) and officials of the Republic of Cuba. It was formed as a coalition of young people to show solidarity with the Cuban Revolution by working side by side with Cuban workers, challenging U.S. policies towards Cuba, including the United States embargo against Cuba. The yearly brigade trips, which as of 2010 have brought more than 9,000 people to Cuba, continue today and are coordinated with the Pastors For Peace Friendship Caravans to Cuba. The 48th Brigade travelled to Cuba in July 2017.

== History ==
=== Original visit ===
The 1959 Cuban Revolution was a key event that galvanized and inspired the growing New Left in the 1960s. Cuba became viewed as a radical and anti-imperialist third world country worthy of praise by many of the radical activists of the 1960s.

In 1969, SDS was composed of competing factions with individual priorities and visions. SDS delegates travelled to Havana, and were inspired by Fidel Castro's New Year's Day speech, in which he called on Cubans to help with the sugar harvest. Although the Americans originally offered to help by taking industrial jobs displaced by the massive sugar harvest, Fidel reportedly responded that if North Americans were to help, they would cut cane. Hoping to unite SDS members behind a new project, the leaders began planning a trip, bringing American activists to Cuba to cut sugar cane. Carl Oglesby originally presented the idea to members of SDS, but was ousted from SDS before it came to fruition. Bernardine Dohrn appointed Julie Nichamin and Brian Murphy to organize the trip. Allen Young was also partly responsible for the organization and negotiations with Carlos Rafael Rodríguez and other members of the Cuban government. While in the US, the group met occasionally by regions to supervise, recruit, and fundraise for the trips. The trip cohort, the Venceremos ("we shall triumph" in Spanish language) Brigade, was promoted as an inspiring and educational experience. The brigade itself was designed to encompass members from all radical movements in the United States, from black power radicals to anti-war student activists.

In November 1969, the first brigade of 216 Americans travelled to Cuba from Mexico City to skirt the U.S. government's restrictions on travel to the island. The participants were to contribute to Cuba's monumental ten million ton zafra (harvest) of 1970, as well as to commemorate the tenth anniversary of the Cuban Revolution. The second Brigade arrived in February 1970, to cut cane and learn about Cuban life. Although the zafra did not reach ten million tons, the Brigades continued.

=== Internal controversy ===
In the first 1969 trip, women often argued with other members, complaining that Cuban society was deeply sexist, and did not live up to the feminist radicalism as expected. Michael Kazin participated in the first 1969 brigade trip and claimed it was an enthralling experience, but as he later heard news of economic failure in Cuba after 1970, he began to reflect on the heavy military presence he once saw in Cuba, and began rethinking his enthusiasm for Cuba, instead seeing it as a Sovietized society. Regina Anavy, a non-insurgent member of the Weather Underground, participated in the 1971 trip to Cuba and described frequent arguments among members, and that she personally became depressingly disillusioned with militaristic Cuban society, and her own radicalism.

Gay Cubans being imprisoned in UMAP camps became a contentious issue within the organization, alongside the issue of institutionalized homophobia in Cuba in general. In 1970, the Venceremos Brigade responded by officially banning LGBT members from joining, citing homosexuality as "a social pathology that reflects a left-over bourgeois decadence". The brigade organizer Allen Young left the organization, and later went on to document LGBT oppression in Cuba.

=== Antonio Maceo Brigade ===
The Antonio Maceo Brigade was formed as a Cuban solidarity group of Cuban American radicals, modeled after the Venceremos Brigade. Their first brigade trip to Cuba occurred in 1977. Many Cubans who joined the brigade were motivated to prove that they weren't counterrevolutionary "gusanos". At the time the Venceremos Brigade refused to allow Cuban exiles to be members believing them all to be middle-class and counterrevolutionary "gusanos" ("worms").

For a Cuban American to be allowed into the Antonio Maceo Brigade, they must have, first, "left Cuba by family decision", secondly "not participated in counterrevolutionary activities", and thirdly "defines him or herself as opposed to the blockade".

== Organization ==
=== Ideology ===
In Venceremos Brigade, Sandra Levinson and Carol Brightman describe the participants, brigadistas, as "American radicals." They were attracted to Cuba by the socialist revolution taking place, the anti-imperialist movement, as well as Cuban culture. The Venceremos Brigade included a diverse group of participants from the beginning. White, Black, Chicano, Native American, and Puerto Rican Americans, as well as activists and feminists participated. In part, the Venceremos Brigade went to Cuba to study revolutionary culture, Che Guevara, and Che's new socialist man. New Left philosophy permeated the movement. The brigadistas also invoked Cuba's history of anti-racist and anti-colonial movements, and referred to the Black Power and feminist movements in the US, with the goal of creating a revolutionary political culture within the group.

Despite the leftist nature of the Brigades and the Cuban government, conflict emerged between Brigade organizers and gay members of the Brigade and their allies. To Cuban officials, the gay liberation movement represented U.S. imperialism, and was a challenge to Fidel Castro and Cuba. The organizers of the Venceremos Brigades settled on a Don't ask, don't tell policy, requiring queer brigadistas to refrain from discussing or performing their sexuality. Queer brigadistas were subject to homophobic slurs and questions, and homophobia was the overall policy. There were also gender-based tensions in the early brigades.

=== FBI surveillance ===
The FBI has questioned individual brigade travellers over the years. Michael Ratner, who had represented members of the Venceremos Brigade, said that visits by FBI agents were most prevalent in the 1970s and 1980s and dropped off during the 1990s. In 2010, at least 10 brigade participants were visited by FBI agents.

== Notable brigadistas ==
- Karen Bass, mayor of Los Angeles
- Carol Brightman, counter-cultural author.
- Linda Burnham, communist political organizer.
- Leslie Cagan, socialist peace activist and radio executive
- Johnnetta Cole, college president and museum executive
- Roxanne Dunbar-Ortiz, historian and academic
- Tibor Kalman, graphic designer
- Michael Kazin, historian, professor and co-editor of Dissent magazine.
- Jeffrey Bruce Klein, founder of Mother Jones magazine.
- Antonio Villaraigosa, former mayor of Los Angeles
- Allen Young, counter-cultural activist and later critic of the Cuban government.

== See also ==
- Antonio Maceo Brigade
- Fair Play for Cuba Committee
