= Antonio Maceo Brigade =

Cuban American political organization

- Brigada Antonio Maceo
- Named after: Antonio Maceo
- Formation: 1977 (organized); 1978 (formal formation)
- Founder: Lourdes Casal and Marifeli Pérez-Stable
- Purpose: Solidarity with Cuba
- Location: United States
- Services: Travel to Cuba
- Affiliations: Venceremos Brigade (inspiration)

The Antonio Maceo Brigade was a political organization in the mid-1970s composed of Cuban Americans that demanded the right of Cuban exiles to travel to Cuba and to establish good relations with the Cuban government. The group was mainly composed of young Cuban Americans that had developed leftist sympathies from experiences in the civil rights movement and the anti-war movement, and were generally critical of anti-Castro rhetoric. The group was invited to Cuba personally by Fidel Castro. The visit brought a brief period of warmer Cuba-United States relations and brought attention to the Cuban-American left.

== History ==
=== Foundation ===
The proposal for an entourage of Cuban exiles to visit Cuba was first raised at the Instituto de Estudios Cubanos in 1974 by Lourdes Casal. Differing accounts would later exist as to how they got their name. One account says it was Casal's idea, while another claims the group was nameless until given the name by Cuban authorities during the group's first visit to Cuba.

The travelers of the Antonio Maceo Brigade was a collection of 55 Cuban exiles, from the United States, Mexico, and Spain, headed by Lourdes Casal and Marifeli Pérez-Stable. The brigade only accepted members who had left Cuba in their youth through parental decision and did not participate in anti-Castro activities while in the United States. Many of the members were children of Operation Pedro Pan and had been active in social movements in the United States as well as having garnered sympathies for the Cuban government. Many were contributors to the magazines Joven Cuba and Areito which both catered to Cuban Americans that favored dialogue with Cuba.

Those who joined the brigade often hoped to prove that they were not counterrevolutionary "gusanos". This desire sprouted from the dual rejection they faced from both right-wing Cuban exiles and left-wing North Americans. At the time the American left-wing Cuban solidarity group the Venceremos Brigade specifically rejected Cuban American members often on belief that all Cuban Americans are middle class and counterrevolutionary "gusanos".

=== First trip to Cuba ===
On December 22, 1977, the brigade took their first trip to Cuba, on the request of the Cuban government after President Jimmy Carter briefly lifted the travel ban with Cuba. The travelers were 55 Cuban exiles, because Cuba would only authorize 55 passports. During the group's two week visit they would be met by cheering crowds, take tours, become involved in volunteer labor, and visit family. The visit was recorded by Cuban filmmakers and released in the film 55 Hermanos which detailed the visitors searches for cultural and political identity, as well as the suffering their exile has caused. The film was widely screened across Cuba, and the vilified "gusano" image of Cuban exiles faded from popularity.

While some of the original brigadistas asked to permanently return to Cuba, Fidel Castro refused and believed they could be more useful to Cuba by returning home and politically dividing the exile community in the United States.

=== Dialogue and continued trips ===
After the visit Fidel Castro would call for dialogues with Cuban exiles abroad. These dialogues resulted in the release of political prisoners, family unifications, and relaxing of restrictions to visit Cuba.

The Antonio Maceo Brigade was formally organized in 1978 after the first travelers return. The formal organization would be modeled after the Venceremos Brigade but only offered trips to Cuban exiles regardless of background. The trips are meant for the visitors to reconnect with family, assist in projects in Cuba, and evaluate the island for themselves.

Some of the travelers that joined after the original trip were less politically homogeneous. The travelers were still notably counter-cultural, soft drug users, pacifists, and LGBT rights advocates. The Cuban government was uncomfortable with the beliefs and cultural practices many travelers held and tried to instill ideological purity tests in the organization. The organization resisted the demand for these tests, and the Cuban government discouraged contact between exile travelers and Cuban youth.

Various Cuban exiles have traveled to Cuba with the organization's assistance and the organization continues to exist today.

== Legacy ==
=== Politics of Cuban exiles ===
After their original trip to Cuba, militant anti-communist factions of the Cuban exile community criticized their visit. In 1979, brigadista Carlos Muñiz Varela would be assassinated in Puerto Rico.

To both Cubans and Americans, Cuban exiles were seen less as a solid anti-communist conservative bloc. The plurality of Cuban exile politics became more apparent to the public. The brigade also opened a space for the involvement of Cuban Americans in leftist politics. Within the Cuban exile community a larger debate opened about the benefits of the 1978 dialogue with Cuba.

=== Members ===
Some members would later become disillusioned with their hopes for Cuba, and lose their revolutionary sympathies. One former member Elsa Alvarez would be arrested in 2006 for allegedly spying for Cuba while working at Florida International University.

== See also ==
- CubaOne Foundation
- Fair Play for Cuba Committee
- Venceremos Brigade
