= Ed Redlich =

American television producer and writer

- Born: New York City, New York, U.S.
- Education: Harvard University; New York University School of Law
- Occupations: Television producer, writer
- Spouse: Sarah Timberman
- Parent(s): Norman Redlich; Evelyn Grobow
- Writing career
- Years active: 1987–present
- Notable works: Without a Trace; Shark; Unforgettable; SEAL Team

Ed Redlich is an American television producer and writer. He was the executive producer for Without a Trace, for which he wrote 5 episodes, as well as the executive producer for Shark starring James Woods. He created the television series Unforgettable and most recently was an Executive Producer on the CBS series SEAL Team. His drama pilot Ways & Means is co-written with Mike Murphy, and starring Patrick Dempsey, was ordered to production by CBS on February 3, 2020.

== Biography ==
Redlich is the son of former NYU Law professor and Dean Norman Redlich and pediatrician Evelyn Grobow. His has two sisters, Bonny Redlich and Carrie A. Redlich, Professor of Medicine at Yale University School of Medicine. Redlich's wife, Sarah Timberman is also in the television business and has produced several shows, including Elementary, Justified, Masters of Sex, and Unbelievable. Redlich graduated from Harvard University and New York University School of Law.

== Career ==
Redlich got his first job in the entertainment business in 1992 as an executive story editor in the series The Round Table. He then went on to write the television movie Ebbie in 1995, following which he became the executive creative consultant for the TV show Strangers. He then went on to write with David E. Kelley for, and later produce, The Practice, for which he won an Emmy. He then moved to the program Felicity for which he wrote and produced. He also acted in one episode. He then wrote and produced for Watching the Detectives.

He was also executive producer/showrunner on the hit crime drama Without a Trace for three seasons. After that, he was executive Producer/showrunner of the CBS drama series Shark.

Redlich co-created and was executive producer of CBS series Unforgettable from 2011 to 2016, starring Poppy Montgomery. The show follows New York police detective Carrie Wells, who has hyperthymesia, a rare medical condition that gives her the ability to visually remember everything.

Afterward, Redlich was the executive producer of the CBS military drama series SEAL Team, which he wrote with Benjamin Cavell.

On February 4, 2020, Redlich wrote a script for the pilot episode of Ways & Means (formerly known as The Whip), starring Patrick Dempsey and produced by 3 Arts Entertainment, PatMa Productions and CBS Studios. In May 2020, the new pilot was yet for consideration in the 2021-2022 television season when it was delayed due to the COVID-19 pandemic, before filming could resumed in January 2021. However, on May 14, 2021, the pilot has been passed and not moving forward by CBS.

== Filmography ==
Year	Title	Credited as				Network	Notes
Year	Title	Writer	Exec. Producer	Creator	Producer	Network	Notes
1987	The Twilight Zone	Yes	No			CBS	Writer (1 episode)
1990	Deadly Nightmares	Yes	No			HBO; USA Network; First Choice; La Cinq	Writer (1 episode)
1997–1998	The Practice	Yes	No		Yes	ABC	Writer (5 episodes)
1998–1999	Felicity	Yes	No			The WB	Writer (2 episodes)
1999	Jack & Jill	Yes	No			The WB	Writer (1 episode)
2002–2005	Without a Trace	No	Yes		No	CBS	Writer (5 episodes)
2006–2008	Shark	No		Yes	No	CBS	Executive producer only
2011–2016	Unforgettable	Yes			No	CBS; A&E	Co-developer, writer (6 episodes)
2017–2018	SEAL Team	No	Yes		No	CBS	Writer (2 episodes)
2021	Ways & Means	Yes			No	CBS	Creator, writer (Not picked up)
