= Unforgettable (American TV series) =

American crime drama series (2011–2016)

- Genre: Police procedural; Crime drama; Mystery
- Based on: "The Rememberer" by J. Robert Lennon
- Developed by: Ed Redlich; John Bellucci
- Starring: Poppy Montgomery; Dylan Walsh; Michael Gaston; Kevin Rankin; Daya Vaidya; Jane Curtin; Dallas Roberts; James Hiroyuki Liao; Tawny Cypress; E. J. Bonilla; Alani "La La" Anthony; Kathy Najimy
- Country of origin: United States
- Original language: English
- No. of seasons: 4
- No. of episodes: 61 (list of episodes)

Production
- Executive producers: Sarah Timberman; Carl Beverly; Ed Redlich; John Bellucci; Jan Nash; Michael Reisz; Ed Decter; Poppy Montgomery; Bill Chais
- Producers: Niels Arden Oplev; Alicia Kirk; Quinton Peeples; Poppy Montgomery; Emmy Grinwis; Karen Campbell; Jill Footlick
- Running time: 41–43 minutes
- Production companies: Timberman / Beverly Productions; CBS Studios (seasons 1–3); Sony Pictures Television

Original release
- Network: CBS
- Release: September 20, 2011 – September 14, 2014
- Network: A&E
- Release: November 27, 2015 – January 22, 2016

Unforgettable is an American police procedural crime drama television series that premiered on CBS on September 20, 2011. Unforgettable was developed by Ed Redlich and John Bellucci, and stars Poppy Montgomery as Detective Carrie Wells, a police detective with an unusually detailed and photographic memory.

After being canceled twice by CBS, Unforgettable was picked up by A&E for a fourth season. The season premiered on November 27, 2015, with two back-to-back episodes. In February 2016, A&E cancelled the show.

== Premise ==
Former Syracuse, New York, police detective Carrie Wells has hyperthymesia, a rare condition that allows her recall almost every detail of her life with exceptional clarity. When her former boyfriend and police partner, Lieutenant Al Burns, needs her assistance in solving a case, she reluctantly joins the New York City Police Department's Queens homicide unit. The move allows her to try to find out the one thing she has been unable to remember, which is what happened the day her sister was murdered.

For part of the series, the episodes had an opening monologue narrated by lead actress Poppy Montgomery. who portrays Carrie Wells:

I'm Carrie Wells. Only a few people in the world have the ability to remember everything—I'm one of them. Pick any day of my life, and I can tell you what I saw or heard: faces, conversations, clues; which comes in handy when you're a cop. If I miss something the first time, it's okay. I can go back and look again. My life ... is unforgettable.

== Episodes ==
Season	Episodes	Originally released			Rank	Viewers (in millions)
Season	Episodes	First released	Last released	Network	Rank	Viewers (in millions)
1	22	September 20, 2011	May 8, 2012	CBS	24	12.10
2	13	July 28, 2013	May 9, 2014	CBS	36	9.05
3	13	June 29, 2014	September 14, 2014	CBS	—N/a	—N/a
4	13	November 27, 2015	January 22, 2016	A&E	—N/a	—N/a

== Cast and characters ==
=== Main ===
- Poppy Montgomery as Detective Carrie Wells, an enigmatic police detective diagnosed with hyperthymesia, a rare medical condition that allows her to visually remember everything she has seen or heard, which is helpful to the investigations she conducts with her team. At eight years old, Carrie's older sister Rachel was murdered, which drove her to become a cop. She graduated from South Syracuse Prep in 1993, and in high school her nickname was "Scary Carrie". From 1997 to 2002, she worked for the Syracuse PD (making detective in 1999), but after her sister's murder investigation was shut down, Carrie wanted a new life and moved to New York City. Since then, Carrie has tried to put her past behind her, but in the Pilot, she joins the NYPD's 117th Precinct in Queens when her former lover and partner, Detective Al Burns, asks her to help solve a case. The move gives her another chance to find the one responsible for her sister's murder. In season two, Carrie and Al transfer to the Major Crimes Section. In "Past Tense" (season 2, episode 5), Carrie is nominated by Eliot Delson for the NYPD Medal for Valor for talking down and apprehending an Afghanistan War veteran with post-traumatic stress disorder. In "Blast from the Past" (season 4, episode 1), Carrie is mentioned as having an unprecedented 100% case closure rating thanks to her hyperthymesia. In the same episode, it is revealed that after leaving Syracuse, she went to Daytona Beach, Florida where she spent six weeks married to Eddie Martin (Skeet Ulrich), a Daytona Beach police officer, whom she never officially divorced until now.
- Dylan Walsh as Lieutenant Al Burns, the Commander of the 117th Precinct's Detective Squad. He was also Carrie's partner and lover when she worked at the Syracuse Police Department. After he comes to her for help, Carrie and Al decide to work together once again to solve various cases. Although no longer in a relationship, they are still good friends, and Al is very protective of Carrie. In season 2, he and Carrie transfer to the Major Crimes Section. In "Behind the Beat" (season 4, episode 3), it is mentioned that Al attended Ithaca College, where he learned how to play jazz trombone. As seen in "With Honor" (season 1, episode 5), Al is a recipient of the US Flag Bar, NYPD Meritorious Police Duty, NYPD Excellent Police Duty, and NYPD Unit Citation.
- Michael Gaston as Detective Mike Costello (season 1), another one of Carrie and Al's co-workers at the 117th Precinct and Al's right-hand man.
- Kevin Rankin as Detective Roe Sanders (season 1), a junior detective who is one of Carrie and Al's co-workers at the 117th Precinct. He tends to make good-natured jokes about Carrie's ability and he is fond of a female techno-geek who aids the group with their cases. Roe also tends to have doubts about most cases.
- Daya Vaidya as Detective Nina Inara (season 1), another one of Carrie and Al's co-workers at the 117th Precinct, Nina is a sassy, street-smart cop.
- Jane Curtin as Dr. Joanne Webster (seasons 1–3), the gifted but crusty Chief Medical Examiner of New York
- Dallas Roberts as Eliot Delson (main seasons 2–3, guest season 4), Special Deputy to the Mayor of New York City and the new boss of the Major Crimes Section of the NYPD
- James Hiroyuki Liao as Detective Jay Lee (seasons 2–4), a detective for the Major Crimes Section of the NYPD, who specializes in technical subjects
- Tawny Cypress as Detective Cherie Rollins-Murray (seasons 2–3), a former decorated FBI agent, who begins working for the Major Crimes Section of NYPD
- E. J. Bonilla as Detective "Denny" Padilla (season 4), a young detective who has a penchant for Carrie
- Alani "La La" Anthony as Dr. Delina Michaels (season 4), the new medical examiner
- Kathy Najimy as Captain Sandra Russo (season 4), the new captain of the Major Crimes Section of the NYPD

=== Recurring ===
- Deanna Dunagan as Alice Wells, Carrie's mother, who has early-onset Alzheimer's disease and is living at a recovery home
- Britt Lower as Tanya Sitkowsky, a technology expert who works with the group
- Omar Metwally as ADA Adam Gilroy, a persistent assistant DA who is unaware that Carrie has hyperthymesia; he has assisted the squad with some cases

== Production ==
=== Development ===
The hour-long program is based on J. Robert Lennon's 2008 short story "The Rememberer". The series was created by Ed Redlich and John Bellucci, and co-produced with Carl Beverly and Sarah Timberman for CBS, where it made its debut on September 20, 2011. The series was also produced by CBS Television Studios and Sony Pictures Television. On October 25, 2011, CBS picked up the series for a full season of 22 episodes.

Serving as a consultant on the series is actress Marilu Henner who, like the series' lead character Carrie Wells, possesses hyperthymesia in real life. She had a guest spot in the episode "Golden Bird", as Wells' aunt, who is suffering from symptoms similar to that of Wells' mother's early-onset Alzheimer's disease.

=== Cancellation and revival ===
On May 13, 2012, CBS canceled Unforgettable. TNT and Lifetime soon expressed interest in picking up the show, but ultimately passed on the series. On June 29, 2012, CBS reversed course, and confirmed that Unforgettable would return for a second season in summer 2013 with an order for 13 episodes, of which seven were broadcast in 2013. Season two premiered on Sunday, July 28 at 9:00 p.m. Eastern / 8:00 p.m. Central. On September 27, 2013, CBS renewed Unforgettable for a third season of 13 episodes to premiere summer 2014. Broadcast of the second season was resumed on Friday April 4, 2014 at 8:00 p.m. EDT.

=== Second cancellation and revival ===
CBS canceled the series after the third season in October 2014. However, in February 2015, A&E picked up Unforgettable for a fourth season consisting of 13 episodes.

=== Third cancellation ===
In February 2016, A&E opted not to order a fifth season. The final episode of season four left an unresolved cliffhanger.

== Reception ==
On Rotten Tomatoes season 1 has a score of 40% based on 20 reviews. The website's critics consensus reads, "More tedious than compelling, Unforgettable is yet another lukewarm procedural." On Metacritic season 1 has a score of 59/100 based on 23 reviews, indicating "mixed or average reviews". Imdb rated the series a 6.8/10 giving decent reviews and individual ratings for all its episodes panning from seasons 1-4.

=== Accolades ===
Unforgettable was nominated for a People's Choice Award for Favorite New TV Drama in 2011.

=== Syndication ===
Start TV currently airs reruns of Unforgettable Sundays at 8PM & 9PM.
