= Kennedy's betrayal =

Perspective on the Bay of Pigs Invasion

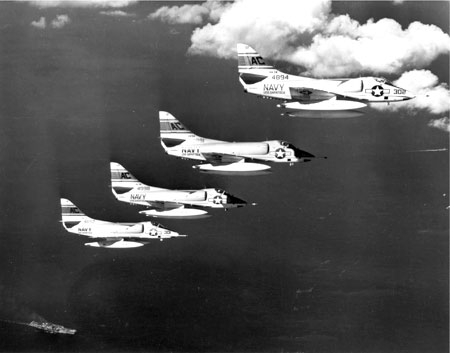
Douglas A-4 Skyhawks from the USS Essex purportedly flying sorties over combat areas during the invasion. The halting of bombings from these planes forms the central argument that Kennedy betrayed Brigade 2506.

Kennedy's betrayal refers to a perspective on the Bay of Pigs Invasion that supposes that United States President John F. Kennedy's refusal to give proper air support to Brigade 2506 caused the defeat of the invasion; this lack of air support later spurred a sense that Kennedy had betrayed Brigade 2506. This allegedly caused Cuban exiles to view him as soft on communism. This soft reputation also supposedly pushed early Cuban exiles to vote Republican in contrast to Kennedy's own Democratic party, creating a long tradition of popular support for the Republican party among Cuban Americans. This supposed distaste for Kennedy among early Cuban exiles has also inspired conspiracy theories that Cuban exiles were involved in Kennedy's assassination.

Critics of this interpretation claim that a notion of "betrayal" was not popular among Brigade 2506 veterans immediately after the invasion, and that the "Kennedy's betrayal" narrative does not wholly explain the failure of the Bay of Pigs Invasion or why Cuban Americans came to largely support the Republican party.

== History ==
=== Kennedy and Cuban exiles ===
One day into the Bay of Pigs invasion, Kennedy received a telegram from Nikita Khrushchev in Moscow, stating the Soviets would not allow the U.S. to enter Cuba and implied swift nuclear retribution to the United States heartland if their warnings were not heeded.

On the second day into the invasion, Kennedy ordered the Alabama Air National Guard to halt its bombings of Cuba. The Alabama Air National Guard originally intended to bomb Cuban airports to debilitate the Cuban Air Force. Without the bombings, the Cuban Air Force could effectively bomb the Brigade 2506 invasion force, ending the invasion.

After the failure of the Bay of Pigs Invasion, Kennedy briefly established Operation Mongoose to organize clandestine missions against Cuba. After the Cuban Missile Crisis, Kennedy agreed with Khruschev that the United States would not sponsor any more exile incursions into Cuba. By 1963, Kennedy was ordering Cuban exile militants to cease all violent operations launched from the United States, while operations from other countries were still tolerated.

In 1964, a series of failed exile attacks occurred against Cuba. Manuel Ray's Cuban Revolutionary Junta and Manuel Artime's Movement for Revolutionary Recovery both failed in their respective attacks on Cuba. Soon after, the CIA began cutting funding to various militant exile organizations.

=== Interpretations of the Bay of Pigs invasion ===
Soon after the invasion, Brigade 2506 started a veterans association, and published a note in 1964, praising Kennedy on his birthday. Journalist Haynes Johnson interviewed many of these veterans and published a book in 1964 The Bay of Pigs: The Leaders' Story of Brigade 2506. In the book, most of the veterans fault CIA planning for the invasion's failure, rather than Kennedy himself.

Orlando Bosch published the pamphlet The Tragedy of Cuba in 1963 which put forward the Kennedy betrayal perspective. Cuban-American lawyer Mario Lazo published in 1968 his book Dagger in the Heart; American Policy Failures in Cuba, that Kennedy is at fault for the failure of the Bay of Pigs invasion. Bay of Pigs veteran and Miami politician Alfredo Duran claims that the betrayal narrative became popular among Cuban Americans by the mid-1960s because it served as a propaganda tool for Republican politicians in Miami. Historian Michael Bustamante has claimed that the Kennedy's betrayal narrative only became popular after the United States started reducing support for Cuban exile militancy in the mid-1960s. CIA's E. Howard Hunt in his 1973 memoir recounting the Bay of Pigs Invasion, Give Us This Day, describes Kennedy's actions as a "betrayal".

In 1976, the betrayal narrative was expounded upon by the United States House Select Committee on Assassinations. In their investigation into John F. Kennedy assassination conspiracy theories, the committee concluded that Cuban exiles had a "motive" to assassinate Kennedy: namely, a sense of betrayal after the failure of the Bay of Pigs Invasion.

In 1998, Bay of Pigs veteran and ex-CIA officer Grayston Lynch published his book Decision for Disaster: Betrayal at the Bay of Pigs which openly described Kennedy as cowardly. Lynch claimed that official U.S. intervention in the invasion was a reasonable idea and would not have been diplomatically disastrous, unlike what Kennedy and other officials believed. The 1998 book Politics of Illusion by James G. Blight and Peter Kornbluh, and the 2001 book Bay of Pigs by Victor Andres Triay, sustain the betrayal thesis of Lynch, and go on to focus on the suffering of the Brigade 2506 soldiers captured and imprisoned after the invasion.

In the 2015 book Latinos and the 2012 Election, political scientist Gabriel R. Sanchez proposes the idea that the Kennedy's betrayal narrative may explain the Republican affiliation of early Cuban exiles, but that later Cuban immigrants are unconcerned with the legacy of the Bay of Pigs invasion, instead making political decisions based on recent policies regarding family travel to Cuba and remittances.

== See also ==
- Cuba de ayer
- Cuban success story
- Grassroots dictatorship
