= Wendish Quarter =

Ethnic enclave of Cottbus

Wendish Quarter Serbski běrtyl
- Ethnic enclave of Cottbus
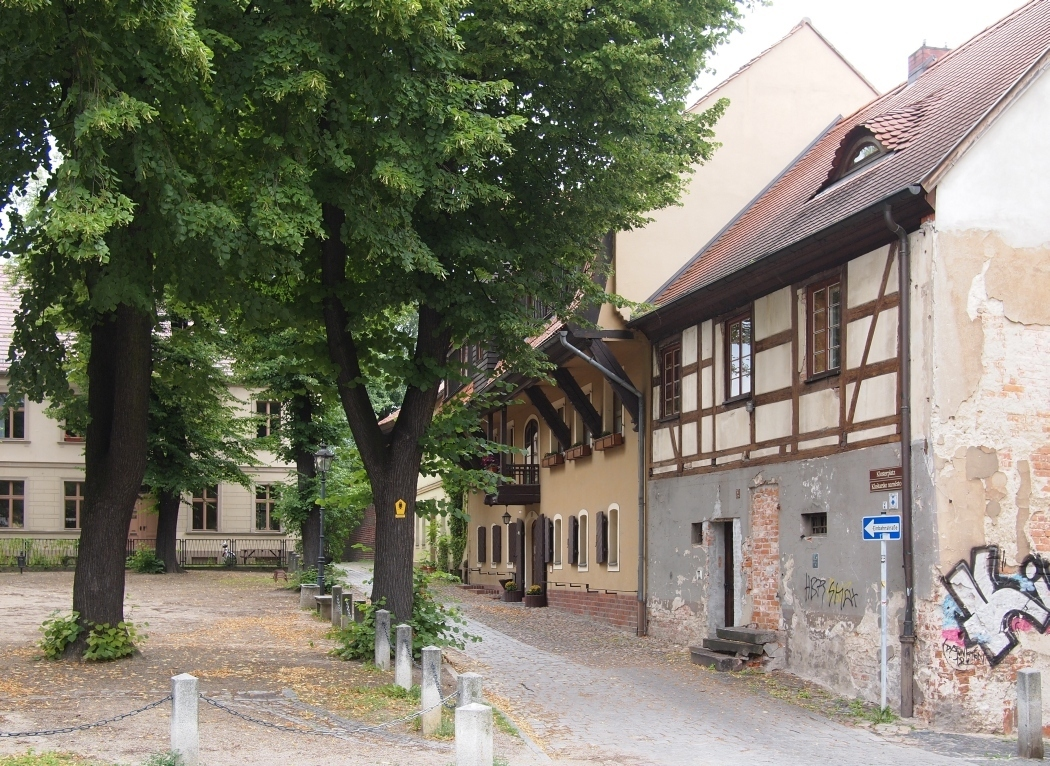
- A street in the Sorbian Quarter
- Interactive map of Wendish Quarter
- Coordinates: 51°46′N 14°20′E
- Historic region: Lusatia
- Country: Germany
- State: Brandenburg
- Urban district: Cottbus

Area
  - Total: 10.4 ha (26 acres)
- Postal code: 03046
- Telephone code: 0355

The Wendish Quarter or Sorbian Quarter (Lower Sorbian: Serbski běrtyl, German: Wendisches Viertel) is a historical ethnic enclave and district in the center of Cottbus, Brandenburg, Germany.

== History ==
The Wendish Quarter was (re)built by the East German government between 1984 and 1989 between Berliner Square and Oberkirche Square. The construction took place on an existing site of historical Sorbian settlement and made use of the Plattenbau technique. Its architecture is influenced by traditional Sorbian motifs and style. The quarter contains a number of decorative mosaics made by Sorbian and German artists.

== See also ==
- Lusatia
