= Rumbaut =

Rumbaut is a surname. Notable people with the surname include:

- Julio Rumbaut (born 1952), Cuban-American media executive
- Rubén G. Rumbaut, Cuban-American sociologist
