= Next year in Havana =

Phrase used by Cuban exiles

The phrase: "next year in Havana", or similarly: "next year in Cuba", are popular phrases used by Cuban exiles, that are often used as toasts during family holidays, and are used to reaffirm the temporary status of their exile, and a wish to one day return to Cuba. The phrase is often used in homage to the Hebrew prayer: L'Shana Haba'ah, which is said at the end of Passover Seder, and translates to English as: "Next year in Jerusalem". This prayer is said in reference to Jewish life in diaspora, and a desire to one day return to Israel.

These phrases have lost popularity since the 1960s, as hopes to return to Cuba have waned amongst Cuban exiles. The idea that the Castro government will soon be overthrown, has been seen as increasingly unlikely, and many Cuban exiles have also become better accustomed to life outside of Cuba, making a return less of a personal priority.

== History ==
In the first emigration wave of Cubans that came after 1959, many emigrants considered their exile to be temporary, because the Castro government was bound to fall soon. Once the Castro government eventually fell, these exiles would return to Cuba, and resume their lives as they were before the Cuban Revolution.

Throughout the 1960s, to compliment a sense of temporary exile, many Cuban emigrants attempted to preserve their Cuban identity by opening Cuban educational institutions for their children while living in exile. With the cancellation of the Freedom Flights in the 1970s, and the entrance of Cuban emigrants from the 1980 Mariel boatlift, a shift developed in the self-perception of Cuban exiles. There was a growing sense that the Castro government was surviving for the long-term, and that their residence outside Cuba would also be long-term. With this shift, came a greater involvement in American politics, and the solidification of the Cuban business district in Little Havana.

For the many Cubans who continue to desire a return to Cuba after the fall of the Castrist government, there is a sense of responsibility that diasporic Cubans should return to assist in the rebuilding of Cuba, to return it to its economic state before the Cuban Revolution.

== Assessments ==
=== Comparison to Judaism ===
Cuban-American writer Achy Obejas has commented that the desire among Cuban exiles to at some point return to Cuba, a land with intense national value to exiled Cubans, is very similar to the desire among Jews to return to Israel. Obejas also remarks that both homelands are viewed as "promised lands", in that after toils in exile, both groups believe they have a destiny to live in these lands.

Author Caroline Bettinger-Lopez writes in Cuban-Jewish Journeys that the relationship between Cuban exiles' desire to return to Cuba, and Jewish desires of return to Israel, have only grown in similarity as the Castro government has survived, making the Cuban desire for return more of a lofty or symbolic goal, like the long-time Jewish desire of return.

Anthropologist Ruth Behar has suggested that the phrase "Next year in Havana" is a direct homage to the Passover prayer "Next year in Jerusalem", and that this homage comes from Cuban exiles living in close proximity to Jews in Miami Beach.

=== Cultural retention ===
The sense that Cuban exiles' residency outside Cuba has inspired efforts to reject cultural Americanization. Assimilation was initially seen by the first exiles as a pointless venture, since exiles would soon return to Cuba. Many early Cuban exiles even constructed Spanish-language schools in Miami to continue the Spanish language among exiles' children.

Writer David Reiff has postulated that with a growing skepticism for the possibility of return, exiles' cultural retention efforts then began to be focused on maintaining a Cuban enclave in Miami, to be a "capital of the exile", where cultural nostalgia could survive with a purpose, even without the mission for a return to Cuba.

== See also ==
- Cuban success story
- Gathering of Israel
- Tiocfaidh ár lá
