= Cuban enclave in Miami =

Cuban American community and ethnic economy of the Miami metropolitan area

The Cuban enclave in Miami is the concentrated Cuban American community of the Greater Miami area and the ethnic economy that developed there after the 1959 revolution. The community was central to the creation of the sociological concept of the immigrant ethnic enclave, an economy in which an immigrant group's own firms employ and serve its members. The concept was developed by Kenneth Wilson and Alejandro Portes from their 1980 study of Cuban Miami. As of the early 2020s the Greater Miami area was home to about 60 percent of all Cuban immigrants in the United States, and roughly one in eight of its residents had been born in Cuba.

The exodus from Cuba transformed Miami from a seasonal resort into a major center of trade and banking between the United States and Latin America. Cuban Americans also became an important part of the governing class of metropolitan Miami and gained influence over United States policy toward Cuba.

== History ==
Before the 1959 revolution Miami the center of Cuban America was concentrated in Key West, Tampa, and New York, and only about 60,000 Cubans lived in the country. The first postrevolutionary wave, the Golden Exile of 1959 to 1962, brought about 248,000 people, drawn mainly from the urban, educated, and mostly white upper and middle classes, who settled largely in Miami.

Later waves enlarged and diversified the community: the United States-funded Freedom Flights of 1965 to 1973; the 1980 Mariel boatlift of about 125,000 Cubans, who were younger, more working-class, and more often Black or mixed-race; the 1994 balsero crisis during the post-Soviet Special Period; and a renewed surge after 2020, the largest in Cuba's modern history. The 1966 Cuban Adjustment Act gave Cuban arrivals a secure legal status, and metropolitan Miami remained the community's principal center throughout.

== Enclave economy ==
The enclave grew comprehensive enough that newcomers found work, schooling, worship, services, and housing within it, without depending on the wider American society.

The early exiles included many professionals, business owners, and people who left with capital with later waves supplying a workforce. The community built its own economic institutions, including rotating credit associations and chambers of commerce, along with prepaid Cuban medical clínicas modeled on pre-revolutionary ones. It also received federal support unavailable to other immigrant groups. These included the Cuban Refugee Program's cash aid, job training and resettlement, jobs created through anti-Castro operations, and later public funding of Cuban-run social services. Total assistance since 1959 has been estimated at $2 billion to $4 billion. Many early exiles regarded themselves as temporary residents awaiting return, an outlook that faded as a second generation grew up in the United States.

By the late 1980s the largest Cuban and Hispanic-owned firms in Miami were concentrated in banking and import-export trade. Although only about 5 percent of the country's Hispanic population lived in Miami, the area held close to half of the forty largest Hispanic-owned firms in the United States. Miami had become the main United States trade gateway to Latin America, displacing New Orleans, an advantage built on the large bilingual workforce created by the exodus. Sales of Cuban-owned businesses rose roughly 37-fold in real terms between 1969 and 1997, and by 2000 the revenue of Cuban American firms approached Cuba's gross domestic product. Multinational corporations located their Latin American headquarters in Miami drew on Cuban managerial personnel and professional labor.

== Geography and demographics ==
Little Havana, the corridor running southwest from downtown Miami along Southwest Eighth Street (Calle Ocho), became the symbolic center of the community, with Spanish-language signage and Cuban cafeterias. By the 1980s most of its residents had moved on: the middle and upper classes to suburbs such as Westchester and Kendall, and much of the working class to Hialeah. Many Cubans reached Miami by secondary migration after first being resettled elsewhere in the United States, and white Mariel refugees moved there at much higher rates than nonwhite ones.

The share of all Cuban Americans living in Miami-Dade County rose from about 24 percent in 1960 to 54 percent in 1990. In the 2017 to 2021 period about 52 percent of all Cuban immigrants in the United States lived in Miami-Dade County, part of a national diaspora of about 2.7 million people of Cuban birth or ancestry. The community has been disproportionately white. Nonwhite Cubans had historically migrated mainly to northern cities, and federal policy steered refugees without local ties away from South Florida; analyzing 1990 census data, Skop found that white Mariel Cubans reported higher incomes, lower poverty, and more professional jobs than nonwhite Mariels.

== Culture and religion ==
Musicians from the Miami's Cuban exile community reached wide American and international audiences through the careers of musicians such as Celia Cruz, Gloria Estefan, and Pitbull, whose work blended Cuban styles with hip-hop and pan-Latin pop.

Cuban exiles formed a distinct religious community within South Florida's Catholic Church rooted in personal and cultural identification rather than the parish exemplified by lay movements (movimientos). They built the National Shrine of Our Lady of Charity (La Ermita de la Caridad) on Biscayne Bay, honoring the patroness of Cuba. Opened in 1973, it draws thousands of pilgrims a year for her feast each September 8.

== Politics ==
Anti-Castro and anti-communist politics have been central to the Miami enclave. In the late 1970s and 1980s, campaigns over these issues and over official bilingualism drew Cubans into local politics and turned the community into a mobilized ethnic group. Cuban Americans naturalized and voted at high rates, and by the early 2000s held a large share of top offices in Miami-Dade County, including mayors, state legislators, and members of Congress. The Cuban American National Foundation, founded in 1981 under Jorge Mas Canosa, became one of the country's most effective lobbying organizations, with the United States embargo on Cuba as its central cause. More recent arrivals, with closer family ties to the island, have been more pragmatic about the embargo, though the community has continued to vote heavily Republican.
