= Alejandro Portes =

Cuban American sociologist

- Born: October 13, 1944 (age 82); Havana, Cuba
- Education: Creighton University (BA); University of Wisconsin–Madison (MA, PhD)
- Known for: Ethnic enclave; Segmented assimilation
- Awards: Princess of Asturias Award (2019)
- Scientific career
- Fields: Sociology
- Workplaces: University of Texas at Austin; Duke University; Johns Hopkins University; Princeton University; University of Miami

Alejandro Portes (born October 13, 1944) is a Cuban-American sociologist known for his research on immigration to the United States and on economic sociology. He is a member of the National Academy of Sciences and the American Philosophical Society, and served as president of the American Sociological Association in 1999.

Portes's work is known for combining theoretically driven questions with original, large-scale longitudinal research. With Kenneth L. Wilson he introduced the concept of the ethnic enclave, and he was among the first sociologists to study the informal economy in advanced as well as developing economies. His theory of segmented assimilation, developed with Min Zhou, describes the divergent paths of the immigrant second generation and drew on the Children of Immigrants Longitudinal Study that he directed with Rubén G. Rumbaut. He helped establish the study of immigrant transnationalism as a research field and contributed to debates over social capital. Urbanization and development formed another aspect of his work, from his studies of Latin American cities to his account of Miami's transformation into an emerging global city. His work is widely cited in the sub-fields of economic sociology, cultural sociology, and race and ethnicity.

== Early life and education ==
Portes was born in Havana, Cuba, on October 13, 1944. He began undergraduate studies at the University of Havana in 1959 but, after joining the student opposition to the new revolutionary government led by Fidel Castro, was expelled and granted political asylum in the United States, arriving in Miami in 1960 at the age of 16. He later stated that he was drawn to sociology by a wish to understand the revolution that had displaced him and his family.

In 1963 Portes began studying sociology at the Catholic University of Argentina in Buenos Aires, then returned to the United States and earned a Bachelor of Arts in sociology, summa cum laude, from Creighton University in Omaha, Nebraska, in 1965. He pursued graduate study at the University of Wisconsin–Madison, earning a master's degree in 1967 and a doctorate in 1970, and became a naturalized United States citizen in 1968. At Wisconsin he studied under the sociologists William H. Sewell and Archibald Haller; his doctoral research, on political attitudes in the shanty towns around Santiago, Chile, formed the basis of his first book, Urban Latin America, co-authored with John Walton.

== Career ==
After completing his doctorate, Portes spent a year as an assistant professor of sociology at the University of Illinois at Urbana–Champaign before moving in 1971 to the University of Texas at Austin, where he became a tenured associate professor and associate director of Latin American studies. At Texas he began the research on immigration that would become his principal focus, launching a study that compared the experiences of Cuban and Mexican immigrants arriving in Texas and Florida.

In 1975 Portes joined Duke University as a full professor, combining his work on immigration with research on urbanization and development in Latin America. During his years at Duke he spent a year in Brazil as an adviser to the Ford Foundation, studying housing policy in the slums of Rio de Janeiro, and a year as a fellow at the Center for Advanced Study in the Behavioral Sciences at Stanford.

In 1980 he moved to Johns Hopkins University, where he held the John Dewey Chair in Arts and Sciences and chaired the sociology department. At Hopkins he launched a comparative study of the informal economy, co-editing the resulting volume The Informal Economy: Studies in Advanced and Less Developed Countries (1989) with Manuel Castells and Lauren A. Benton. He also led a comparative study of Caribbean urbanization, published as the edited volume The Urban Caribbean: Transition to the New Global Economy (1997), with Carlos Dore-Cabral and Patricia Landolt. In addition, he studied the transformation of Miami in City on the Edge (1993), written with Alex Stepick.

Portes joined Princeton University in 1997 as the Howard Harrison and Gabrielle Snyder Beck Professor of Sociology, a chair he held until becoming emeritus in 2014. In 1998 he co-founded the Center for Migration and Development with Marta Tienda, serving as its director from 1999 to 2012. His research on the immigrant second generation spanned both appointments, beginning at Johns Hopkins, where he developed the theory of segmented assimilation and launched the Children of Immigrants Longitudinal Study with Rubén G. Rumbaut, and continuing at Princeton, where it culminated in Legacies: The Story of the Immigrant Second Generation (2001). He had been elected president of the American Sociological Association in 1997 and served from 1998 to 1999, the first Latin American-born scholar to hold the office; his presidential address, "The Hidden Abode: Sociology as Analysis of the Unexpected," was delivered at the association's 1999 annual meeting.

Since 2011 Portes has been affiliated with the University of Miami, where he has held the Emilio Bacardi distinguished professorship and serves as a research professor of law and distinguished scholar in the arts and sciences. In this later period he returned to the study of Miami, publishing The Global Edge (2018) and Emerging Global Cities (2022) with Ariel C. Armony. He has also served on the board of trustees and the Scientific Council of the IMDEA Social Sciences Institute in Madrid.

== Research ==
Portes's research centers on economic sociology and the sociology of immigration.

=== Ethnic enclaves and immigrant economies ===
His early immigration research grew out of a long-term study, begun while he was at Texas, that interviewed Cuban and Mexican immigrants on their arrival in the United States and followed them over the next several years. With Kenneth L. Wilson, he developed the concept of the ethnic enclave, describing how Cuban exiles in Miami built dense entrepreneurial communities that employed fellow immigrants and offered a path to economic mobility outside the mainstream economy. At Johns Hopkins he extended this interest to informal economies, economic activity that operates outside state regulation, arguing that such activity was not confined to the developing world but also operated within advanced economies, where it shaped urban labor markets and the incorporation of new immigrants. An article he wrote with Saskia Sassen helped establish the subject within the discipline, and the work grew into a five-year, multi-country project published as The Informal Economy: Studies in Advanced and Less Developed Countries (1989).

=== The immigrant second generation ===
In the late 1980s Portes and Rubén G. Rumbaut launched the Children of Immigrants Longitudinal Study, which surveyed several thousand children of immigrants in the Miami and San Diego areas and followed them into early adulthood. The project challenged the assumption that assimilation into the mainstream was the only route to success for immigrants' children and underpinned the theory of segmented assimilation, developed with Min Zhou, which holds that the second generation integrates into different segments of American society, some advancing while others undergo what Portes termed downward assimilation. The study's findings appeared in Legacies: The Story of the Immigrant Second Generation (2001), written with Rumbaut. He later extended the research to Spain through the Longitudinal Study of the Second Generation (ILSEG), conducted with Rosa Aparicio.

=== Transnationalism ===
After moving to Princeton, Portes turned to immigrant transnationalism, the cross-border economic, political, and cultural ties that immigrants sustain between their countries of origin and settlement. He helped define it as a field of study, distinguishing durable transnational activities from occasional cross-border contacts and calling for systematic, comparative research. Much of this work drew on studies of Colombian, Dominican, and Salvadoran immigrant communities.

=== Social capital and economic sociology ===
Portes was also a contributor to economic sociology and to debates over social capital. In a widely cited 1998 review he traced the concept's intellectual origins and cautioned against treating it as an unqualified good, separating its sources from its effects. Working with Julia Sensenbrenner he analyzed how social networks and structures shape economic action among immigrants, introducing concepts such as bounded solidarity and enforceable trust, and in collaboration with Patricia Landolt he examined the "downside" of social capital, the ways close community ties can constrain as well as assist individuals. He brought this work together in Economic Sociology: A Systematic Inquiry (2010).

=== Urban transformation and global cities ===
Throughout his career Portes also studied urbanization and development in Latin America and the United States. His early work examined politics and poverty in Latin American cities, from the shanty towns of Santiago to the favelas of Rio de Janeiro, and he later directed comparative studies of Caribbean urbanization. In City on the Edge (1993) he analyzed how immigration, and the Cuban enclave in particular, reshaped Miami into a multicultural metropolis. He returned to the city decades later, developing with Ariel C. Armony a comparative account of how Miami and comparable cities emerge as global cities.

== Selected works ==
- 1976. Urban Latin America: The Political Condition from Above and Below, with John Walton. University of Texas Press. ISBN 978-0-292-76427-9. OCLC 1531979
- 1981. Labor, Class, and the International System, with John Walton. Academic Press. ISBN 978-0-12-562020-8. OCLC 7459776
- 1985. Latin Journey: Cuban and Mexican Immigrants in the United States, with Robert L. Bach. University of California Press. ISBN 978-0-520-05003-7. OCLC 9827640
- 1989. The Informal Economy: Studies in Advanced and Less Developed Countries, edited with Manuel Castells and Lauren A. Benton. Johns Hopkins University Press. ISBN 978-0-8018-3736-4. OCLC 613899013
- 1990. Immigrant America: A Portrait, with Rubén G. Rumbaut. University of California Press. ISBN 978-0-520-06894-0. OCLC 20566813
- 1993. City on the Edge: The Transformation of Miami, with Alex Stepick. University of California Press. ISBN 978-0-520-08217-5. OCLC 27035218
- 1997. The Urban Caribbean: Transition to the New Global Economy, edited with Carlos Dore-Cabral and Patricia Landolt. Johns Hopkins University Press. ISBN 978-0-8018-5517-7. OCLC 35521534
- 2001. Legacies: The Story of the Immigrant Second Generation, with Rubén G. Rumbaut. University of California Press and Russell Sage Foundation. ISBN 978-0-520-22847-4. OCLC 425622750
- 2010. Economic Sociology: A Systematic Inquiry. Princeton University Press. ISBN 978-0-691-14222-7. OCLC 459210357
- 2018. The Global Edge: Miami in the Twenty-First Century, with Ariel C. Armony. University of California Press. ISBN 978-0-520-29711-1. OCLC 1029062423
- 2021. Los nuevos españoles: La incorporación de los hijos de inmigrantes, edited with Rosa Aparicio. Bellaterra. ISBN 978-84-18684-39-5. OCLC 1311519212
- 2022. Emerging Global Cities: Origin, Structure, and Significance, with Ariel C. Armony. Columbia University Press. ISBN 978-0-231-20516-0. OCLC 1410125571

== Awards and honors ==
Portes was elected a fellow of the American Academy of Arts and Sciences in 1998 and a member of the National Academy of Sciences in 2001, and he is a member of the American Philosophical Society and the National Academy of Education.

His book City on the Edge: The Transformation of Miami (1993), co-authored with Alex Stepick, won the Robert E. Park Award for best book in urban sociology from the American Sociological Association (ASA) in 1995 and the Anthony Leeds Award for best book in urban anthropology. In 2002 his Legacies: The Story of the Immigrant Second Generation received both the Distinguished Scholarly Publication Award and the W. I. Thomas and Florian Znaniecki Award also from the ASA. In 2008 he received the NAS Award for Scientific Reviewing from the National Academy of Sciences.

He holds honorary doctorates from five institutions:

- the New School for Social Research
- the University of Wisconsin–Madison
- the University of Genoa
- Roskilde University
- the University of Lisbon

In 2019 Portes received the Princess of Asturias Award in the social sciences.

== See also ==
- Wisconsin model
