= Teo A. Babun =

Cuban-American businessman and philanthropist

Teo Babun
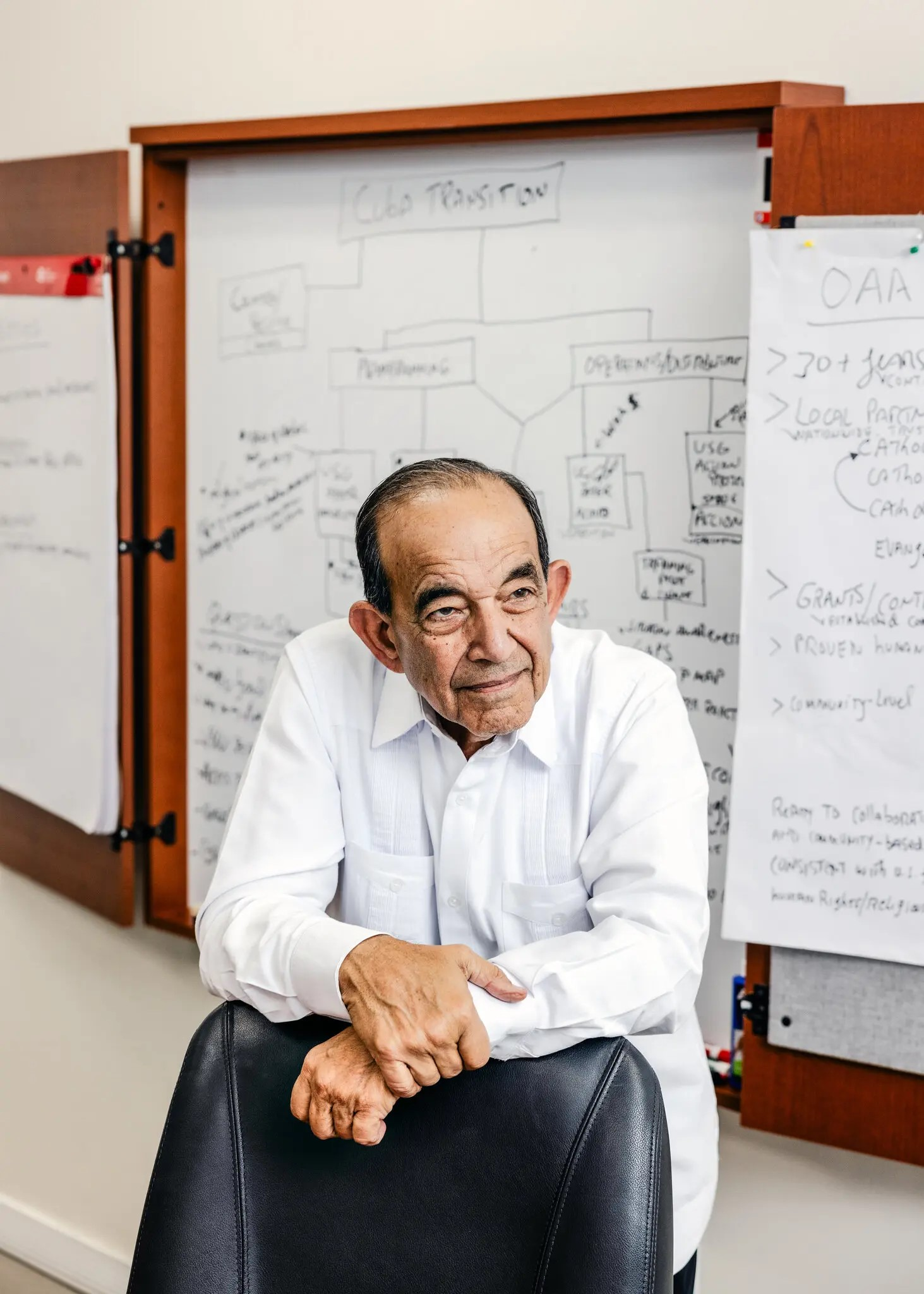
- Babun in 2026
- Born: Teofilo I Babun; 1948 (age 77–78); Cuba
- Education: Michigan Technological University (BA)
- Occupation: Non-profit manager Philanthropist
- Known for: Inventions; Defending religious liberty; Expertise on Cuba's infrastructure
- Awards: Outstanding Young Alumni from Michigan Technological University 1981; Outstanding Community Service Award from the Florida Faith-Based and Community-Based Advisory Council to the governor 2022; Honorary Doctorate in Letters from Miami International Seminary 1991; Inducted into the Electrical and Computer Engineering Academy of MTU 2007; Alumni Outstanding Service "Brother Andres Award" from Immaculata-LaSalle; Keepers of the Flame of Human Rights Lifetime Achievement Award from Americas Chapter of Foundation for the Betterment of Life, Culture, and Society
- Website: Outreach Aid to the Americas

Teo A. Babun (born 1948) is a Cuban-American businessman, evangelical philanthropist, and human rights (freedom of religion) advocate. He is the founder of BG Consultants and Cuba-Caribbean Development Co. and also the head of Outreach Aid to the Americas (OAA) and AmericasRelief.

== Personal life ==
=== Early life ===
Babun's grandparents were born in Bethlehem. His father became a major financial supporter of the Cuban Revolution. Though born in Cuba, Babun has spent most of his childhood and life as a Cuban exile in the United States. Babun's father was tried in a 1960 Communist show trial, intended to confiscate all of his property and belongings. Before the verdict was read in his trial, he escaped to Miami with his wife. The Cuban government later expelled the rest of the family to the United States when Babun was 11 years old. They were deported on June 1, 1960, via the Ignacio Agramonte International Airport. Their family home became a residence for Raúl Castro, future president of Cuba after the retirement of Fidel Castro. The Cuban Government confiscated the Babun family holdings and properties consisting of a cement plant, farms, maritime, lumber/timber, minerals, and other interests after their escape.

=== Education ===
Babun lived in Florida until he attended university at Michigan Technological University (MTU), graduating in 1972 with bachelor's degrees in electrical engineering and business engineering administration. In 2002, he received an Honorary Doctorate in Letters from Miami International Seminary (MTU). He also later received a PhD from non-accredited Vision International University. In 2007, was inducted into the Electrical Engineering and Computer Engineering Academy at MTU.

=== 2000 return visit to Cuba ===
Babun returned to Cuba in October 2000, as an "official observant" to open-air Evangelical Celebrations instituted after the visit of Pope John Paul II in 1999. Following this visit Babun was asked by government officials not to return to Cuba, due to the reaction of the public to his evangelical work.

== Career ==
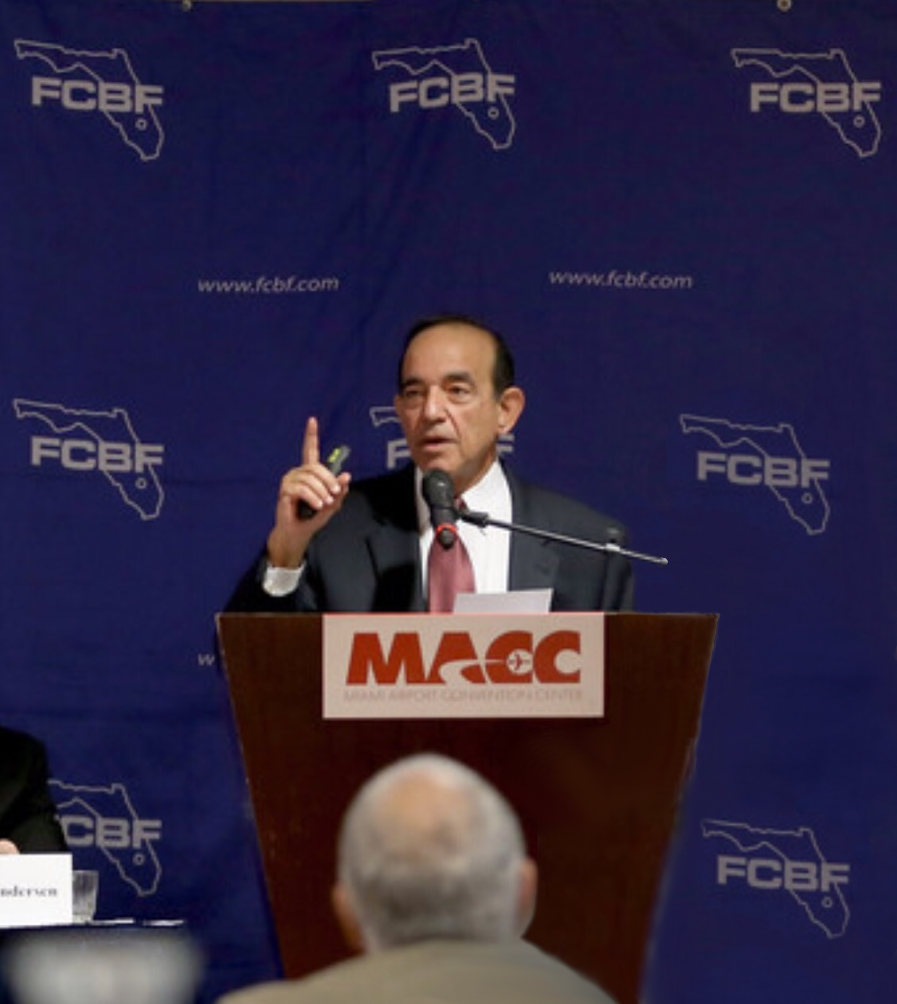
Dr. Teo Babun delivering a keynote speech to the Florida Customs Brokers & Forwarders Association in 2017

Babun began his professional career manufacturing electrical components in Wisconsin and Connecticut. He founded General Electro-Components in 1980 to manufacture electrical relays and solenoids under the brand "Line Electric", serving as president and CEO. In 1981 he developed the TO-5, then known as "The World's Smallest Solenoid." In 1987, he moved back to South Florida in order to work for his father's company, Bahamas Line shipping company. In 1990 Babun founded the Cuba Investment Fund, in order to accumulate investment funds and strategies for when the United States lifts the economic embargo they have levied on the island.

Babun is the founder and head of BG Consultants, located in Miami. He is also the founder and managing partner of the Miami consulting firm Cuba-Caribbean Development Co, a division of his Babun Group Consulting that advises companies on the potential of a future free market in Cuba. In his role with the for-profit company he has advocated for a change in Cuban-US economic relations. Babun's clients have included Baskin Robbins and Royal Caribbean Cruises.

In 1992 he founded the Babun Shipping Corporation in Miami under his holding company T. Babun Co. He was also the founder of Cuba Claims Registry Assistance LLP, a property registry for Cuban exiles to establish claims upon land and other property that was confiscated.

== Ministry, activism, and controversies ==
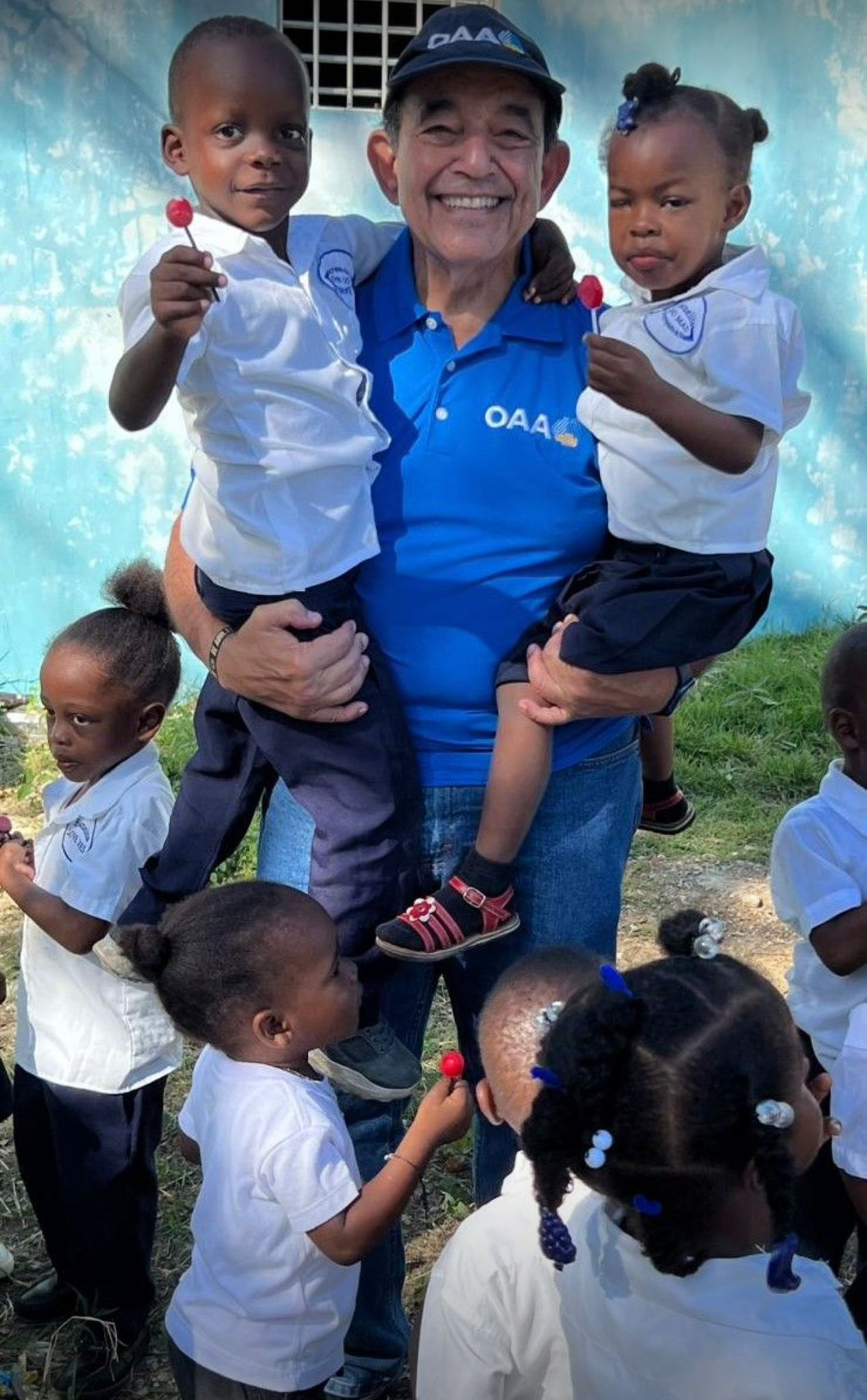
Dr. Teo Babun visiting the community of Los Algodones in the Dominican Republic, which serves mostly Haitian refugee children through schools and clinics, a project supported by Babun's nonprofit

In 1994, Babun decided to dedicate the rest of his life to humanitarian ministry in support of vulnerable persons in the region and the emerging church in Cuba. He founded Outreach Aid to the Americas, Inc. (OAA). The organization responds to the needs of the vulnerable people in the Americas Region through relief and development programs. OAA thru its faith-based initiative “EchoCuba” uses methodologies, tools, and training modules to help advance entrepreneurship, organizational skills, education, religious freedoms, and social services in Cuba.

In 2016 OAA expanded services to Central America, the Caribbean Islands, including Puerto Rico and Southern Mexico to send aid from the US to faith-based organizations and provide business development products to encourage small business creation. As the spokesperson for the organization, he has advocated for religious freedoms, small business ownership as one of the keys to creating the conditions necessary for reducing poverty in Central America, and for more effective disaster resiliency programs to save lives in countries affected by hurricanes.

On February 12, 2019, he was accused of being a “public enemy and a mercenary” of Cuba by Granma, Cuba's official publication of the Central Committee of the Communist Party. He was charged with trying to create discord among Evangelical Church Leaders in Cuba by “providing them with misleading information and enticing them to commit acts of disobedience with promises of humanitarian aid.” In interviews with Radio & Television Marti, Babun defended his efforts to unify the Evangelical Church Leaders around a shared advocacy campaign to obtain greater Freedom of Religion and Belief language in a new constitution scheduled for a referendum on February 24, 2019.

In 2021, OAA expanded its international advocacy work on Freedom of Religion & Belief to include Nicaragua. It also built its local capacity of faith-based partners in the Central American Northern Triangle Countries of Honduras, El Salvador, and Guatemala to participate in The United States Agency for International Development's (USAID) efforts to help address the drivers of irregular migration to the United States.

In 2022, he advocated for religion freedom and belief for Nicaragua and Cuba at the Oslo Freedom Forum in Geneva where he led a panel discussion titled “America’s Wars: How to Defend Human Rights and Religion in Cuba, Nicaragua, and Venezuela”, and at the Summit of the Americas in Los Angeles, where he also spoke at side events against the authoritarian governments of Cuba, Venezuela, and Nicaragua. On October 1 of the same year, Babun received the Outstanding Community Service Award from The Florida Faith-Based and Community-Based Advisory Council, in an event that brought together Miami-Dade County elected officials and faith community leaders to better engage, communicate, and collaborate to help build Miami and its communities.

On June 25, 2024, Babun spearheaded an initiative in Washington, D.C., advocating for the establishment of a commission to develop transition plans for Cuba amidst its ongoing turmoil. The commission aims to draw from the lessons of post-Soviet Union transitions and discuss strategies to address these challenges. With over half a million Cubans immigrating to the U.S. between 2022 and 2023, American interests are closely connected to this issue. The roundtable was attended by more than 30 stakeholders in Cuban affairs and U.S. inter-agency representatives.

On September 24, 2024, Babun lead the formation of a trilateral partnership initiative between the United Nations’ UNITAR, Florida International University (FIU), and Outreach Aid to the Americas to establish an international training center aimed at fostering learning and the exchange of best practices across the western hemisphere, particularly in areas where OAA had extensive experience—disaster relief and sustainable development. The CIFAL-Miami Training Center, (which stands for “International Training Center for Authorities and Leaders”) will be located in FIU's main campus and is only the second in the U.S. and the 34th in the world. Its mission is to strengthen the capacities of public authorities, civil society leaders, and private sector actors across the U.S., Latin America, and the Caribbean. This center will become a hub for knowledge exchange, capacity building, and training, addressing some of the most critical global challenges and empowering local entities to promote sustainable development in line with the UN Sustainable Development Goals (SDGs).

As Chair of CIFAL-MIAMI, Babun participated in UNITAR's Annual Steering Committee Meeting, which took place in December 2024 in Riyadh, Saudi Arabia. Babun and CIFAL-Miami's participation in this event underscored their commitment to enhancing the capabilities of various stakeholders in the U.S., Latin America, and the Caribbean, and advancing their sustainable development in alignment with the UN's SDGs.

In May 2025, despite his USAID-funded programs being frozen for months, the Cuban Government accused Babun of working Elon Musk on "sinister plans". The Cuban outlet Cubadebate conflated Babun's freedom of speech advocacy work in Cuba with Musk's Starlink, and accused the pair of "plotting to bypass state internet control and empower local seminaries through remote conectivity". Babun clarified his organizations do stand for freedom —of speech, of belief, and of opportunity, and for connecting Cubans to the world; however, claims of a covert Starlink invasion are "more science fiction than policy fact".

=== Awards ===
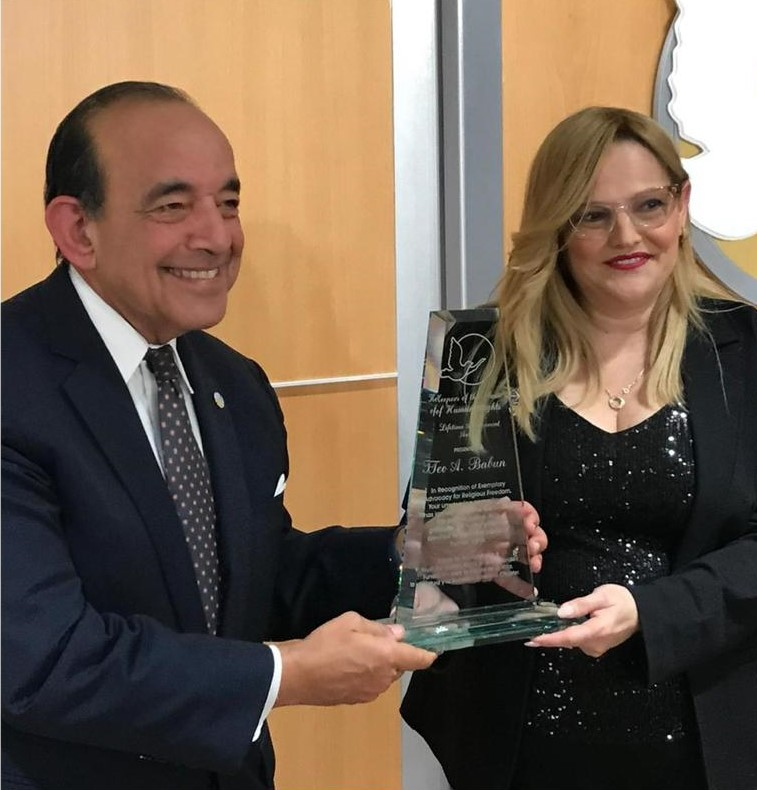
Dr. Teo Babun accepting the prestigious Keepers of the Flame of Human Rights Award in 2023

In 2023, Babun received the Alumni Outstanding Service "Brother Andres Award" from Immaculata-LaSalle High School in Miami, for his provision of food, medical supplies, and oxygen concentrators to Catholic Orders in Cuba during the COVID-19 pandemic.

On December 7, 2023, Babun was bestowed with the "Keepers of the Flame of Human Rights" Lifetime Achievement Award by the Americas Chapter of the Foundation for the Improvement of Life, Culture, and Society, sponsored by the Church of Scientology.

=== Campaigns ===
In 2023, Babun led a campaign to create the Office of Freedom of Religion and Belief (FoRB) Secretariat at the Organization of American States (OAS), arguing that FoRB matters were handled by the Secretariat on Human Rights, thus diluting the efforts and concentration needed to advocate specifically for religious freedom in Latin America. Support was pledged from the countries of Canada, Costa Rica, Ecuador, Dominican Republic, El Salvador, and Guatemala. The United States was scheduled to join the campaign in 2024.

=== Testimony ===
On June 28, 2023, in testimony before the U.S. Commission on International Religious Freedom (USCIRF), Babun gave testimony regarding the Cuban government's repression of religious freedom and other related rights and also provided first-hand accounts of the repressive tactics used by the Cuban government to stifle independent religious communities. This was the commission's first hearing outside of Washington, D.C.

=== Cuban Property Restitution Discussions ===
In April 2026, Babun was featured in a New York Times article examining unresolved property claims stemming from the Cuban government's confiscation of private assets following the 1959 revolution. This article detailed the Babun family's experience of having extensive industrial and residential properties confiscated, as well as Teo's broader perspective on the need for a balanced resolution framework. Babun has argued that any long-term resolution should avoid displacing current residents while addressing the historical grievances of displaced families.

== Publishing ==
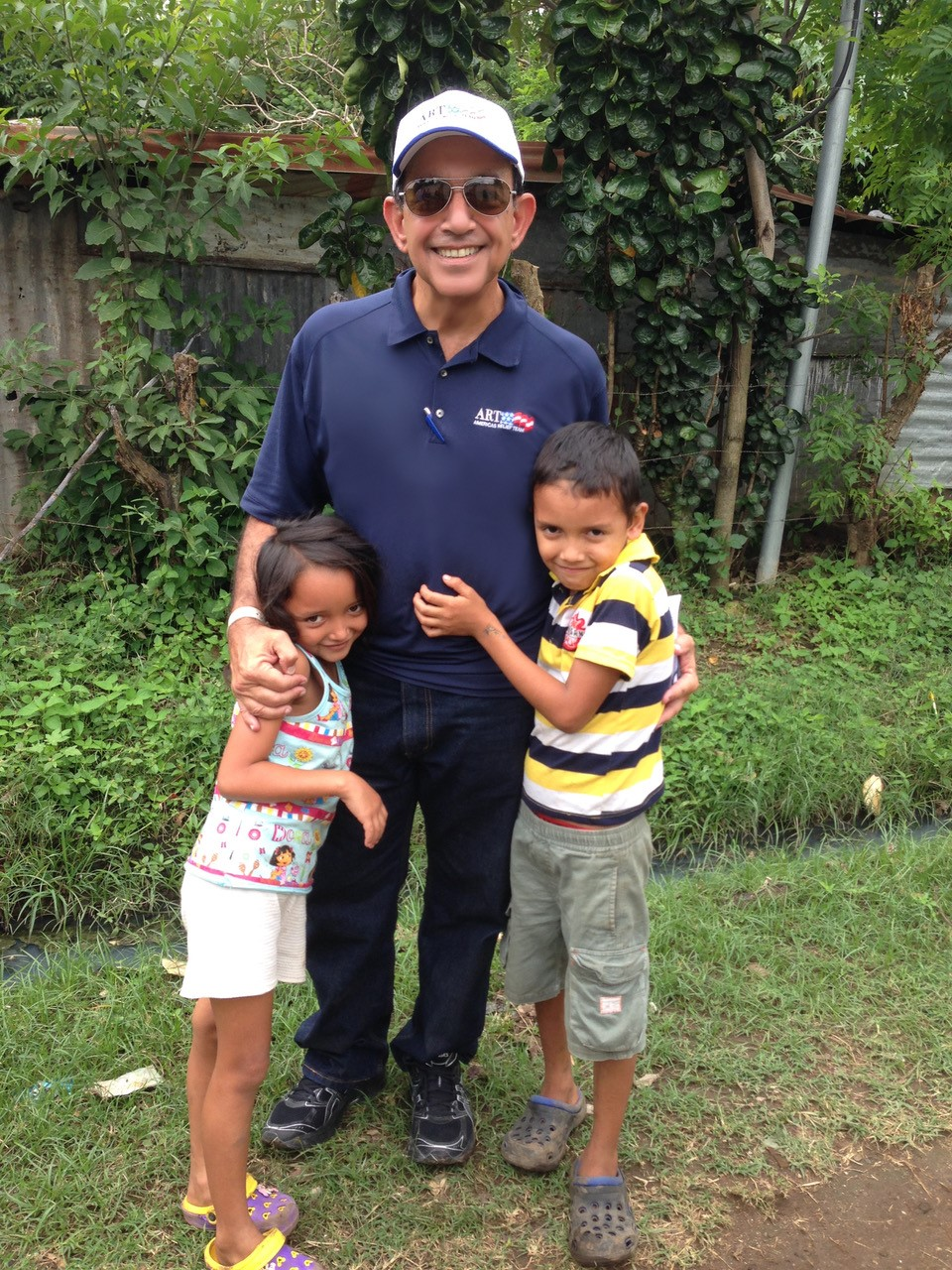
Babun in El Salvador 2016

Babun is the author of The Business Guide to Cuba. The Sun-Sentinel stated that for "foreign companies - and to U.S. entrepreneurs who want the lay of the land ahead of normalized relations - Babun's book provides precious detail for strategic planning".

He also co-authored the book The Cuban Revolution: The Years of Promise with Victor Andres Triay in 2005, using photographs of the Cuban Revolution owned by Babun's father used as the primary focus of the book. José Manuel García reviewed the book in the Arizona Journal of Hispanic Cultural Studies, calling the book "an exceptionally significant contribution to Cuban history through the power of photography". Babun has also self-published the book Dealing with Your Personal Crisis, which presents Christian coping methods for personal traumas. His recent prayer and reflection books also include Practicing His Presence: 8 Minutes of Daily Intimacy with God and Buenos Dias Abba: Sabiduria y Reflexion Para Todos Los Dias. His most recent publication is the book Faith and Freedom in Latin America, which details and exposes violations of religious freedom in Cuba, Nicaragua, and Venezuela.

Babun has been a contributor to newspapers and digital publications including the Chicago Tribune, the Washington Post, The Miami Herald,El Nuevo Herald, The Washington Examiner, The Sun Sentinel, The Hill, The Washington Stand, and The Washington Times.
