= Cuba de ayer =

Mythologized view of pre-revolution Cuba

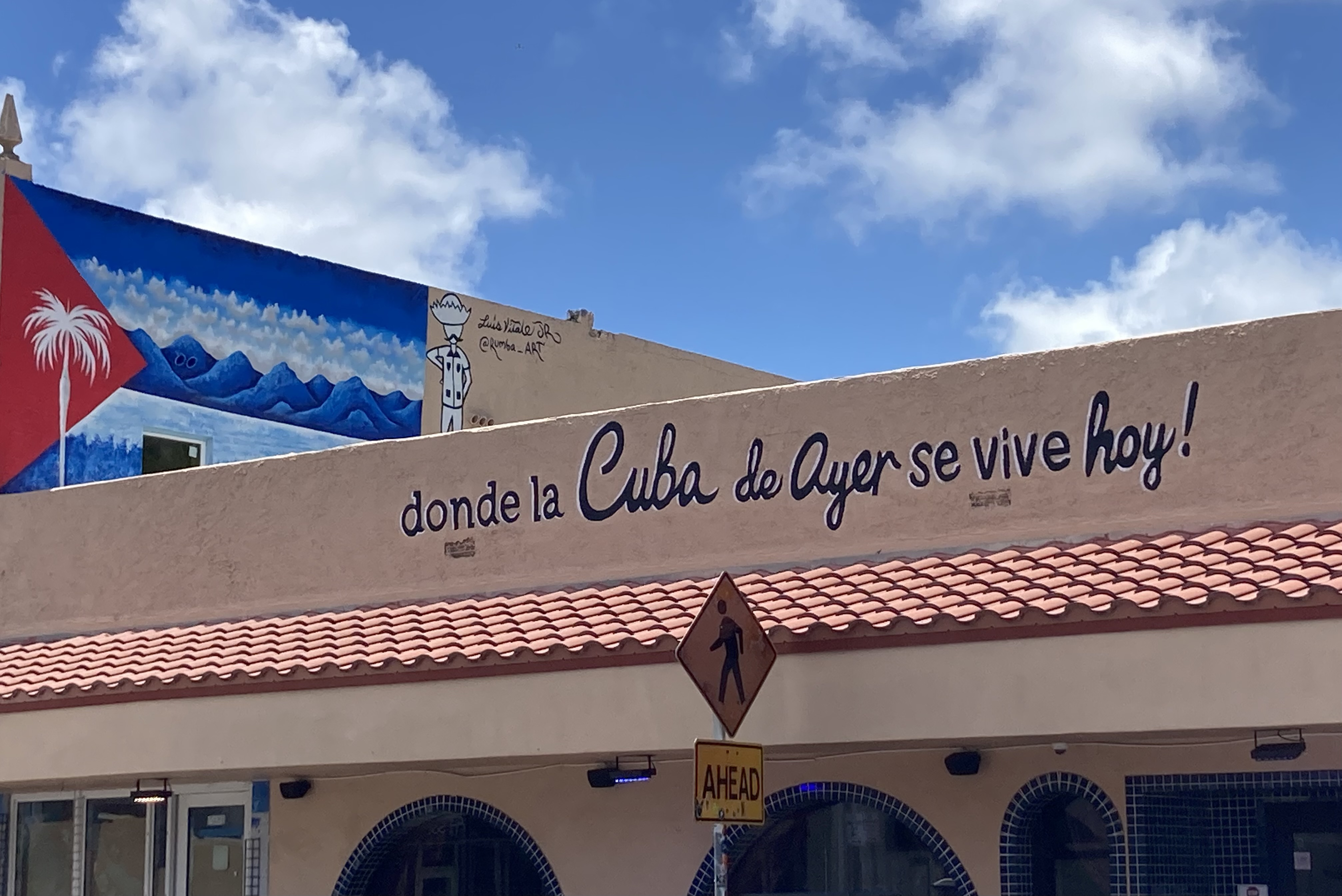
Restaurant roof in Little Havana reading "donde la Cuba de Ayer se vive hoy!", which means in English: " where the Cuba of yesterday is lived today".

The idea of the Cuba de ayer (lit. 'Cuba of yesterday') is a mythologized idyllic view of Cuba before the overthrow of the Batista government in the Cuban Revolution. This idealized vision of pre-revolutionary Cuba typically reinforces the ideas that Cuba before 1959 was an elegant, sophisticated, and largely white country that was ruined by the government of Fidel Castro. The Cuban exiles who fled after 1959 are viewed as majorly white, and had no general desire to leave Cuba but did so to flee tyranny.

Cuban exiles who uphold this image of the Cuba de ayer view their version of Cuban culture as more desirable than American culture, and that it is best to recreate their lost culture of the Cuba de ayer in the United States. Proponents of the image of the Cuba de ayer also view Cuba as a more worthy country to live in than the United States and hope to return Cuba to the Cuba de ayer after the hoped for fall of the government of Fidel Castro. Critics of the idea of the Cuba de ayer claim it is a nationalist myth created for white Cuban exiles that ignores the reality of Cuban life before 1959, and embraces an exotic vision of Cuba.

== History ==
=== Cuba under Fulgencio Batista ===
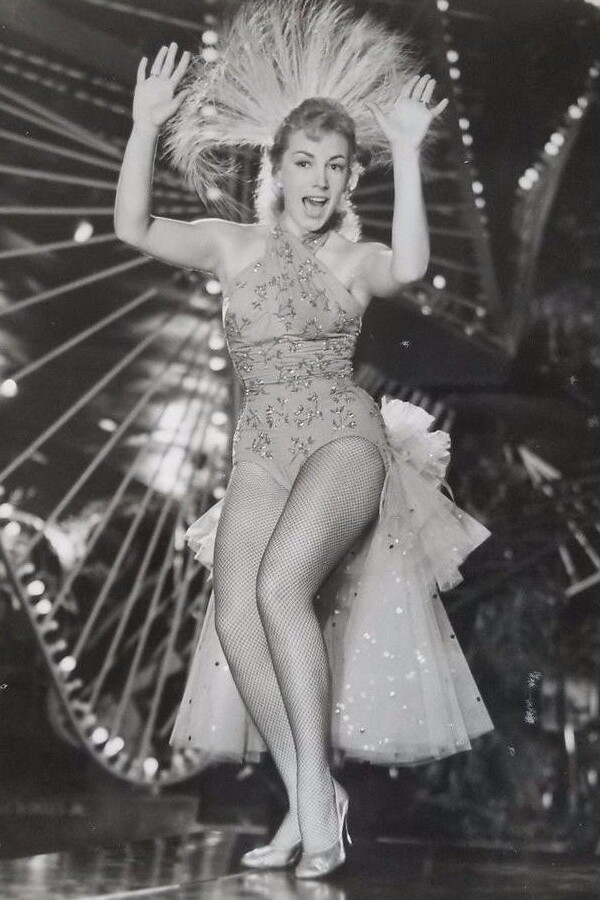
Actress Evangelina Elizondo at the Tropicana Club in Havana, 1950s. An image of the idealized era of Cuba encompassing the Cuba de ayer.

On March 10, 1952, three months before the elections, Batista, with army backing, staged a coup and seized power. He ousted outgoing President Carlos Prío Socarrás, canceled the elections and took control of the government as a provisional president. The United States recognized his government on March 27.

Upon his seizure of power, Batista inherited a country that was relatively prosperous for Latin America. According to Batista's government, although a third of Cubans still lived in poverty, Cuba was one of the five most developed countries in the region. In the 1950s, Cuba's gross domestic product (GDP) per capita was roughly equal to that of Italy at the time, although still only a sixth of that of the United States. Moreover, although corruption and inequality were rife under Batista, Cuban industrial workers' wages rose significantly. In 1953, the average Cuban family only had an income of $6.00 a week, 15% to 20% of the labor force was chronically unemployed, and only a third of the homes had running water. Despite this, according to the International Labour Organization, the average industrial salary in Cuba became the world's eighth-highest in 1958, and the average agricultural wage was higher than some European nations (although, according to one sample from 1956 to 1957, agricultural workers could only find employment for an average of 123 days per year while farm owners, rural tenants and sharecroppers worked an average of only 135 days per year).

Throughout the 1950s, Havana served as "a hedonistic playground for the world's elite", producing sizable gambling, prostitution and drug profits for the American mafia, corrupt law-enforcement officials, and their politically elected cronies. In the assessment of the Cuban-American historian Louis Perez, "Havana was then what Las Vegas has become." Relatedly, it is estimated that by the end of the 1950s the city of Havana had 270 brothels. In addition, drugs, be it marijuana or cocaine, were so plentiful at the time that one American magazine in 1950 proclaimed "Narcotics are hardly more difficult to obtain in Cuba than a shot of rum. And only slightly more expensive." As a result, the playwright Arthur Miller described Batista's Cuba in The Nation as "hopelessly corrupt, a Mafia playground, (and) a bordello for Americans and other foreigners."

On July 26, 1953, just over a year after Batista's second coup, a small group of revolutionaries attacked the Moncada Barracks in Santiago. Government forces easily defeated the assault and jailed its leaders, while many others fled the country. The primary leader of the attack, Fidel Castro, was a young attorney who had run for parliament in the canceled 1952 elections. In the wake of the Moncada assault, Batista suspended constitutional guarantees and increasingly relied on police tactics in an attempt to "frighten the population through open displays of brutality." By late 1955, student riots and anti-Batista demonstrations had become frequent, and unemployment became a problem as graduates entering the workforce could not find jobs. These were dealt with through increasing repression. All youth were seen as suspected revolutionaries. Due to its continued opposition to Batista and the large amount of revolutionary activity taking place on its campus, the University of Havana was temporarily closed on November 30, 1956 (it did not reopen until 1959 under the first revolutionary government). On November 25, 1956, the yacht la Granma carrying the Castro brothers and 80 other rebels including Ernesto "Che" Guevara and Camilo Cienfuegos headed from Mexico to Cuba. On December 2, After arriving and exiting the ship, the band of rebels were attacked by government forces but began to make their way into the Sierra Maestra mountains. The group of survivors included Fidel and Raúl Castro, Che Guevara and Camilo Cienfuegos. The dispersed survivors would link up again with the help of peasant sympathizers and would form the core leadership of a rebel guerrilla army.

=== Cuban Revolution and Golden exile ===
On December 31, 1958, the Battle of Santa Clara took place in a scene of great confusion. The city of Santa Clara fell to the combined rebel forces of Che Guevara, Cienfuegos, and Revolutionary Directorate (RD) rebels led by Comandantes Rolando Cubela, Juan ("El Mejicano") Abrahantes, and William Alexander Morgan. News of these defeats caused Batista to panic. He fled Cuba by air for the Dominican Republic just hours later on January 1, 1959. Comandante William Alexander Morgan, leading RD rebel forces, continued fighting as Batista departed and had captured the city of Cienfuegos by January 2.

After the success of the Cuban Revolution the first to emigrate were those who were associated with or worked for the old Batista regime. The U.S. embassy in Havana and consulate in Santiago would regularly grant visas to Cubans wishing to leave. By the middle of 1959 various new policies enacted by the revolutionary government had affected Cuban life such as the redistribution of property, nationalization of religious and private schools, and the banning of racially exclusive social clubs. Those that began to leave the island were driven by them being negatively affected by new economic policies, their distaste with new national public schools, or anxiety over government supported racial integration. The government would quickly label exiles who left as "racists", discouraging Afro-Cubans to also emigrate. These conditions caused the majority of those who emigrated to be either upper or middle class, white, and catholic. Many middle class emigrants were often professionals that were tied to American companies that were nationalized. Many of the emigrants that would leave believed they would be returning soon to Cuba, believing the U.S. would soon intervene and overthrow the Fidel Castro government.

=== Development of the "Cuba de ayer" myth ===
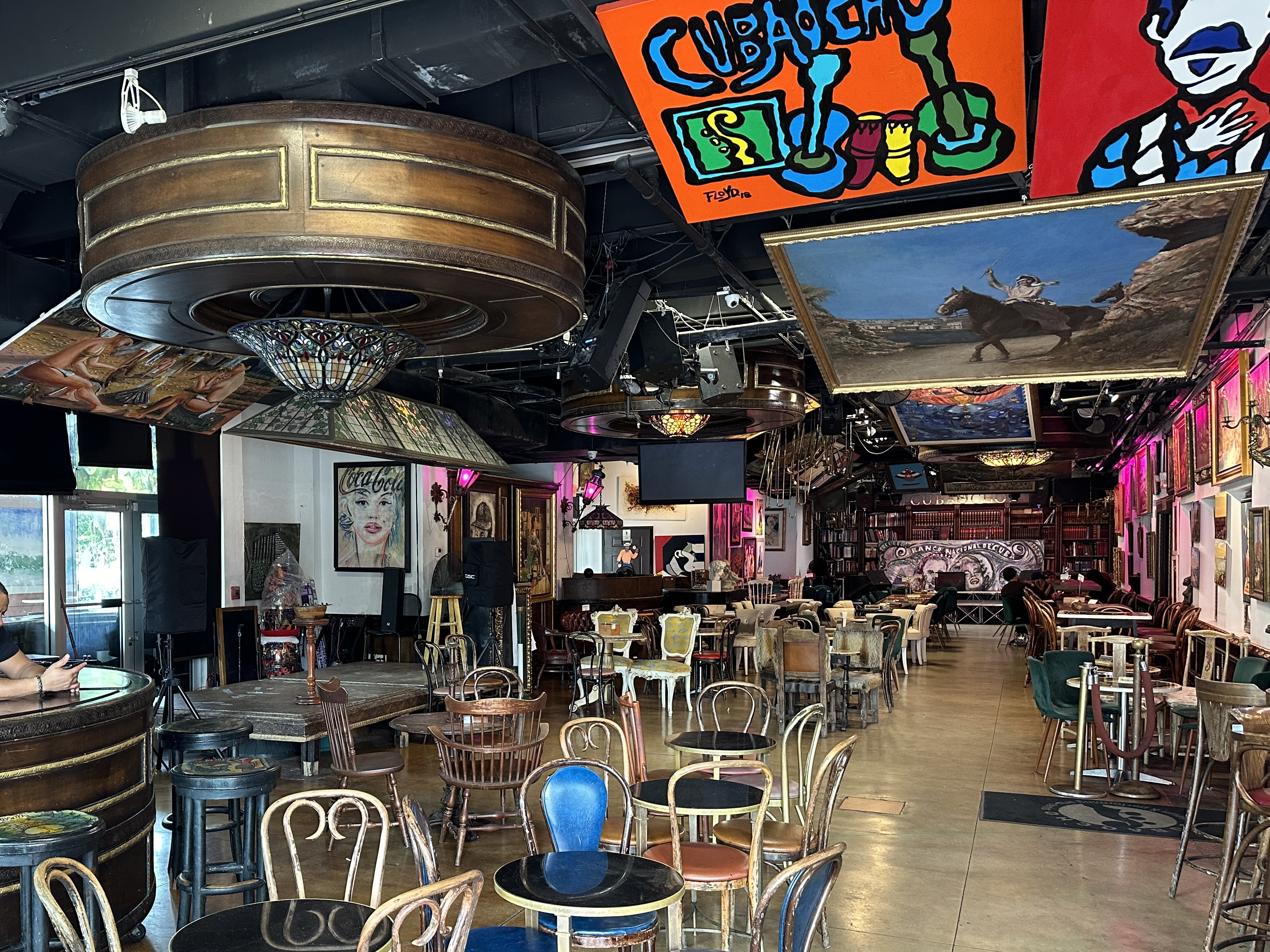
Cubaocho Museum and Performing Arts Center in Little Havana, decorated to celebrate a pre-revolutionary Cuban style.

This first wave of upper-class emigrants from Cuba in the immediate years after the Cuban Revolution would leave the island with only memories of Cuba from the era of Fulgencio Batista. These memories formed the genesis of the idealized image of the Cuba de ayer. The Cuban exiles who came immediately after the revolution were largely shocked by American racism which differed in expression from Cuban racism. In Cuba no formal de jure racial segregation existed. Whatever social manifestations of racism existed in Cuba were often ignored or unknown to the upper-class white emigres arriving in Miami. The sight of formal racial segregation in the American south by Cuban exiles reinforced the idea that the Cuba de ayer was free of racism unlike the United States.

The reconstruction of outlawed businesses and social organizations in Cuba by exiles now in Miami, reaffirmed the memories of the idyllic Cuba de ayer. This reconstruction came from the waning of a hope to return to a Cuba without Fidel Castro in power, so Cuban exiles began to model their communities in the image of the Cuba de ayer. The most notable of these communities is Miami's Little Havana neighborhood. Little Havana became an epicenter for Cuban life in Miami, specifically in how many institutions are Cuban owned and modeled in the image of nostalgia for the Cuba de ayer.

Many Cuban emigres came decades later and sometimes viewed the recreation of Cuba de ayer in Miami as an over-sanitized image of Cuba, but despite this the nostalgia of Cuba de ayer still permeated in many Cuban communities that were established earlier. By the 1990s the image of the Cuba de ayer became quite popular among Cuban Americans due to its promotion in the music of Cuban acts like Gloria Estefan, and Willy Chirino. Cuban nostalgia that permeated Cuban-American culture in the 1990s is theorized by professor Michael Bustamante to have been a reaction to the newer cultural attitudes brought by newer Cuban emigrants from the 1994 Cuban rafter crisis.

== Tenets ==
The propagation of the idea of the Cuba de ayer includes many ideas as to what Cuban society was like before 1959, and the nature of Cuban exiles in the United States.

- The Cuba de ayer was free of mass racism. Some cases of discrimination may have existed but Cuban society was at large far less racist than the United States at the time, and the races in Cuba generally respected one another.
- The Cuba de ayer is also viewed as generally socially cohesive and was without any political repression.
- The Cuba de ayer was much more economically advanced than the Cuba of today. In order to return Cuba to the economic successes of the Cuba de ayer Cuban exiles will have to return and reconstruct Cuba as a capitalistic and democratic society. Resident Cubans lack the economic tools and moral character to reconstruct the Cuba de ayer so Cuban exiles in Miami will have to do it.
- The Cuba de ayer no longer physically exists but should be carried on through the cultural and moral behavior of Cuban exiles.
- Nostalgia for the Cuba de ayer is sophisticated and distinguishes the more civilized Cuban exiles from those without sophistication, such as marielitos and Balseros.
- A Cuban exile is more at home in their true homeland which is the Cuba de ayer rather than the United States which only serves as a subpar temporary home.

== Criticism ==
Miguel A. De La Torre has written on the nature of the idea of the Cuba de ayer and is often critical of it. He has written that the actual Cuba of Fulgencio Batista was not as idyllic as made out to be and was solely designed for American tourists' benefit in that it was mostly populated by brothels and casinos. He has also asserted that nostalgia for the Cuba de ayer is an incredibly restrictive model for Cuban exilic identity.

Alan A. Aja has argued that Cuban exiles desire to maintain a claim to the homeland of the Cuba de ayer which they view as a sophisticated homeland, is an attempt at maintaining racial whiteness and ignoring the racism in Batista's Cuba as well as racism in Miami.
