= Cuban success story =

Stereotype about Cuban Americans

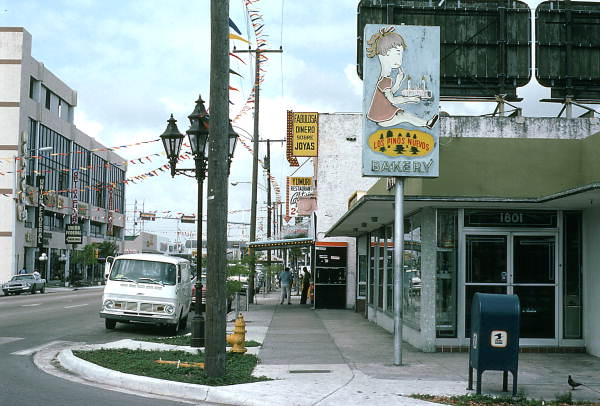
Cuban businesses in the Little Havana neighborhood of Miami (1978), home of the mythologized successful Cuban American business sector.

The Cuban success story, sometimes referred to as the myth of the golden exile, is the idea that Cuban exiles that came to the United States after the 1959 Cuban Revolution were mostly or exclusively political exiles who were white, largely conservative, and financially successful. The idea garnered traction starting in the 1960s via rags-to-riches stories of Cuban exiles in the US news media, and became widely promoted within the Cuban American community. The idea has been criticized as an inaccurate depiction of Cuban Americans that ignores historical fact.

== History ==
=== 1960s ===
In the years 1959 to 1962 various Cuban exiles would leave the island and become referred to as "golden exiles". Most of the exiles in this period were staunchly anti-communist and upper-class who were successful under the regime of Fulgencio Batista and were fleeing the dangers of the successful Cuban Revolution. During the early exodus the US government and national media began promoting an image of the exiles as an exceptional people worthy of Americans' sympathy, and birthed the idea of the Cuban success story. Despite the original upper-class character of many of the first exiles after the Bay of Pigs Invasion of 1961 many unprofessional laborers and clerical workers began to join the exodus from Cuba. Despite the financially successful character of many of the early exiles they often had trouble continuing their professional careers in the United States and often faced economic downturn. By the later Cuban emigration wave starting in 1965 many of the Cuban emigrants were increasingly unskilled workers and from outside the capital of Havana.

Reports about the rising financial success of Cuban exiles became popular in the US media, around the same time as the growth of the African American civil rights movement. This growing image of Cuban Americans as a model minority was often used in Miami to shame African Americans. The image of the successful Cuban was used as an example to demonstrate the ease of rising from poverty and that poverty faced by African Americans was self-inflicted. African American civil rights leaders often lamented that Cuban refugees received undeserved government benefits that were unfairly not granted to African Americans. In Miami some African Americans complained that incoming Cuban refugees were also competing with them in the newly desegregated job market.

=== 1970s–1980s ===
Once in the United States, some Cubans were able to form a successful Cuban business enclave in Miami. Social scholars have reasoned this enclave was able to form for various reasons including the professional skills brought by some early exiles, the close match between jobs available in Miami and the type of workers leaving Cuba, and US aid grants given Cuban exiles. While it is difficult to garner how much money was given to some Cuban exiles by the CIA for their assistance in anti-Castro operations, this theory was a popular rumor in among Anglo business owners in Miami. In 1973 National Geographic published how Cuban exiles had formed an impressive business community in Miami and in doing so helped produce the popular image of the wealthy "golden exile".

The Cuban success story also became popular in Cuban exile circles. The idea that Cubans in the United States were economically successful was embraced as a tool to convince Cubans in Cuba of the advantages of emigrating. The Cuban success story's popularity allowed it to become accepted in various academic circles, policy making groups, and journalist organizations.

By the time of the 1980 Mariel boatlift the image of Cuban immigrants as "golden exiles" began to fade as popular media began to characterize Marielitos as lone males, criminals, and homosexuals. In a Gallup poll of Americans done soon after the Mariel boatlift Cubans ranked dead last among ethnic groups rated for their positive contributions to the United States. To distance themselves from new growing anti-Cuban prejudice older Cuban exiles began to carry the new prejudices against Marielitos to retain a sense of separation from the Mariel arrivals. The narrative of the Cuban success story became repopularized in tandem with older exiles reaction to anti-Marielito sentiment.

== Myth ==
=== Narrative ===
The narrative of the Cuban success story goes that Cuban exiles left the country after the 1959 revolution for solely political reasons. Cuban exiles firmly disagreed with the communist government of Cuba and had no intentions of emigrating for better economic opportunities outside of Cuba. The exiles were mainly middle class and highly skilled, with occupational skill, high education, and language abilities that they brought with them to the United States. Most of the emigrants were pale skinned and encountered little if any racial prejudice in the United States.

In general Cuban exiles were economically successful and conservative becoming a perfect model minority in the United States, and a prime example of the accessibility of the American dream. This attainment of the American dream is often told as a model for others to look up to such as other ethnic minorities in the United States as well as others living abroad. The model is believed to prove American exceptionalist ideas that anyone can become successful and integrated in the United States.

=== Impact ===
The image purported in the Cuban success story myth of Cubans as wealthy and privileged "golden exiles" has various social ramifications. The stereotype presented of Cuban exiles as wealthy emigres encourages the ignoring of poverty within Cuban American communities, especially poverty faced by Cuban refugees who migrated after 1980. The assumption of the privilege of Cuban Americans can also isolate them from the broader Hispanic community who are encouraged to view them as unfairly privileged compared to other Latinos. When the Cuban success story narrative is embraced by Cubans who emigrated in the early 1960s it can result in a feeling of superiority and prejudice directed towards other Latinos as well as Cubans who emigrated later than the "golden exiles".

Apart from the myth's impact in creating prejudices amongst Cuban Americans and other Latinos, the success story is also used to shame African Americans. Since the early Cuban exodus and civil rights movement, the Cuban success story has been used as a model minority myth that stresses the need for hard work to escape poverty. This idea that Cubans have become successful via sheer determination is often used to shame African Americans who face poverty and implies that African American poverty must come from a lack of determination and laziness. African Americans who accept the ideas of the Cuban success story often come to view Cuban refugees as given undeserved government benefits and that Cuban Americans in general are unfairly privileged compared to them.

The myth also utilized by different political groups. The right-wing in the United States often repeats the myth as an example of proof of American exceptionalism and the attainability of the American dream. While leftists often use elements of the myth to portray a staunchly right-wing and politically organized Cuban exile community often dubbed the "Miami Mafia" which is used to demonize and discredit Cuban exiles.

== Criticism ==
=== Political commentary ===
Political scientist Sheila L. Croucher has argued that the propagation of the Cuban success story was a propaganda tool that supported the interest of North American capitalists, the U.S. government, and even some politically opportunistic Cuban exiles.

Sociologists Francisco Hernández Vázquez and Rodolfo D. Torres have asserted that the story also helped ease the worries of xenophobic Americans who may have doubted why the government gave Cubans immigration privileges and federal aid.

Scholar Gregory Helmick has noted that some early Cuban exiles adopted the term "Golden exile" to differentiate themselves from later Cuban exiles such as those of the Mariel boatlift. This identity emphasized their ideological purity, machismo, and racial "whiteness".

Martin Luther King Jr. challenged the image of the Cuban success story and instead argued that all minority groups, including both Cubans and Black Americans, share much in common due to their disadvantaged position in a discriminatory society.

=== Historicity ===
Scholar Maria Vidal de Haymes argued in 1997 that the relevance of the Cuban success story ignores recorded economic realities. The story ignores that general Cuban American household incomes have been recorded as substantially lower than general non-Latino household incomes in the United States. It also ignores the high rates of poverty among recent Cuban immigrants, Afro-Cubans, and Cuban-American children. Scholar Lisandro Perez has noted in 1986 that the Cuban success story popularizes the idea of a skyrocketing economic mobility for Cubans that is not based in fact, but Cubans have been recorded as having a much higher average income that other Hispanic groups in the United States. This disparity is so much so, that it is far greater than the disparity between the incomes of Cubans and non-Latinos.

Scholar Jorge Duany has argued that Cubans are not as economically successful as propagated in the Cuban success story, and Cubans must suffer through cultural assimilation difficulties that every immigrant group goes through. He also argues that the story only resembles the reality of the early Golden exile and not of other working class Cubans that came in later emigration waves.

== See also ==
- Cuba de ayer
- Irish slaves myth
- Lost Cause of the Confederacy
- Vietnam stab-in-the-back myth
