= Victor Andres Triay =

Cuban American historian and writer (born 1966)

Victor Andres Triay (born August 2, 1966) is a Cuban American historian and writer, known for the books Fleeing Castro: Operation Pedro Pan and the Cuban Children’s Program, Bay of Pigs: An Oral History of Brigade 2506, The Unbroken Circle (historical fiction trilogy), and The Mariel Boatlift: A Cuban American Journey.

== Early life ==
Triay was born in Miami, Florida, in 1966. His parents had fled Fidel Castro’s Cuba in 1960. He was raised in Miami and graduated from Christopher Columbus High School in 1984. He obtained a B.A. in History from the University of Florida and an M.A. and Ph.D. from Florida State University. He began teaching History at Middlesex Community College in Middletown, Connecticut in 1992. In 2001 he was awarded the Samuel Proctor History Prize by the Florida Historical Society for his book, Bay of Pigs: An Oral History of Brigade 2506.

== Career ==
Triay’s historical works primarily explore the Cuban exile experience. He especially makes use of personal testimonies from exiles and presents his works using a combination of traditional historical narrative and oral history. Said Triay, “I want to be one of my people who writes our history. After his second book, a Miami Herald article stated, “The book established Triay as a significant researcher of Cuban exile history.”

Triay's first book, Fleeing Castro: Operation Pedro Pan and the Cuban Children’s Program, was the first book length work published about the exodus of more than 14,000 unaccompanied Cuban children from Communist Cuba and the federally-sponsored program that provided them care in the United States. On the question of whether or not the programs were morally justified (in light of the trauma of family separation), Triay emphatically believes that, given the rise of a totalitarian Communist state in Cuba, the parents of the Operation Pedro Pan children were validated in sending their offspring out of the country and to the United States. He said, “Anything that parents feared happened. They were dead on. They were almost prophetic.” He also stated, “They sent their kids into the hands of U.S. agencies and the Catholic Church rather than let Fidel Castro raise them.”

Three years later, Triay published Bay of Pigs: An Oral History of Brigade 2506, a historical account of the Bay of Pigs invasion through the eyes of the men in the U.S.-sponsored liberation army. Triay was awarded the Florida Historical Society's Samuel Proctor Oral History Prize in 2001 for Bay of Pigs. The work was subsequently picked up by Random House for release in Spanish translation, releasing it in 2003 under the title, La Patria Nos Espera. Triay, who knew several Brigade veterans during his upbringing, said of his motives for writing the book, "I felt there was a tremendous distortion in the works others did about the Cuban-American experience, and my goal as a historian has been to be honest about what happened and clarify some of those distortions. Some of what you read made the exiles look like a bunch of blind, maniacal, machete-wielding anti-Communist, anti-Castro fanatics. But it wasn't like that. They were fighting for democracy. They were very idealistic and wanted a revolution in Cuba but felt they had been betrayed by Castro."

In 2005, Triay teamed up with Teo Babún and co-authored Cuban Revolution: Years of Promise, a photographic history of the Cuban Revolution. The images in the book were from a collection belonging to Babún’s late father, whose company photographer was given special access to Castro’s mountain based guerrilla camp. The Arizona Journal of Hispanic Cultural Studies called it, “an exceptionally significant contribution to Cuban history through the power of photography.”

In 2013–14, Triay released the historical fiction trilogy, The Unbroken Circle. The trilogy consists of Book 1 — The Struggle Begins; Book 2 — Freedom Betrayed; and Book 3 — On Freedom's Shores. All three books were highly acclaimed by readers. In September 2019, Triay released The Mariel Boatlift: A Cuban American Journey, about the 1980 exodus that brought more than 125,000 Cuban refugees to the United States. The book received the Gold Medal from the Florida Book Awards (2019, non-fiction category) and an Honorable Mention for the American Association for State and Local History's "Leadership in History" Award in 2020.
