= Marta Tienda =

Sociologist

Marta Tienda is an American sociologist. From 1997 to 2001, she served as the director of the Office of Population Research at Princeton University. She is the co-author and co-editor of many books, including The Hispanic Population of The United States (1987).
