= Ethnic enclave =

Geographical spot with high concentration of certain ethnic groups

Ethnic enclaves
- Binondo, Manila, the world's oldest Chinatown, is an example of an ethnic enclave.

In sociology, an ethnic enclave is a geographic area with high ethnic concentration, characteristic cultural identity, and economic activity. The term is usually used to refer to either a residential area or a workspace with a high concentration of ethnic firms. Their success and growth depends on self-sufficiency, and is coupled with economic prosperity.

Douglas Massey describes how migrant networks provide new immigrants with social capital that can be transferred to other tangible forms. As immigrants tend to cluster in close geographic spaces, they develop migrant networks—systems of interpersonal relations through which participants can exchange valuable resources and knowledge. Immigrants can capitalize on social interactions by transforming information into tangible resources, and thereby lower costs of migration. Information exchanged may include knowledge of employment opportunities, affordable housing, government assistance programs and helpful NGOs. By stimulating social connections, enclaves can generate intangible resources that help to promote the social and economic development of its members.

By providing a space for people who share the same ethnic identity to create potentially beneficial relations, ethnic enclaves can assist members in achieving economic mobility. By reducing their exposure to language and cultural barriers, enclave economies can improve co-ethnics' incorporation into the economy. Enclaves can help to explain the success of some immigrant groups. Additionally, while the ethnic enclave theory was developed to explain immigrant incorporation into the receiving society, it has also been linked to migration processes at large as successful incorporation of immigrants has the potential to lower migration costs for future immigrants, an example of chain migration.

Despite their immediate benefits, the long-term implications of participation in an ethnic enclave are a topic of debate. Enclave economies have been linked to a glass ceiling limiting immigrant growth and upward mobility. While participation in the enclave economy may assist in achieving upward mobility through increased availability of employment opportunities in the enclave labor market, it may also impede acquisition of host country skills that benefit the immigrant over the long-run. Such delays constrain immigrants to activity within the enclave and secludes them from the larger economy. Opportunities available to mainstream society can thus be out of reach for immigrants who haven't learned about them. Thus, the accelerated path toward economic mobility that lures new immigrants into enclave economies may impede success. One 2024 study, for example, found that voluntary relocation from an ethnic enclave led to greater economic outcomes for those who were relocated and their children. Integration into an ethnic enclave may delay and even halt cultural assimilation, preventing the immigrants from benefiting from mainstream institutions.

== History ==
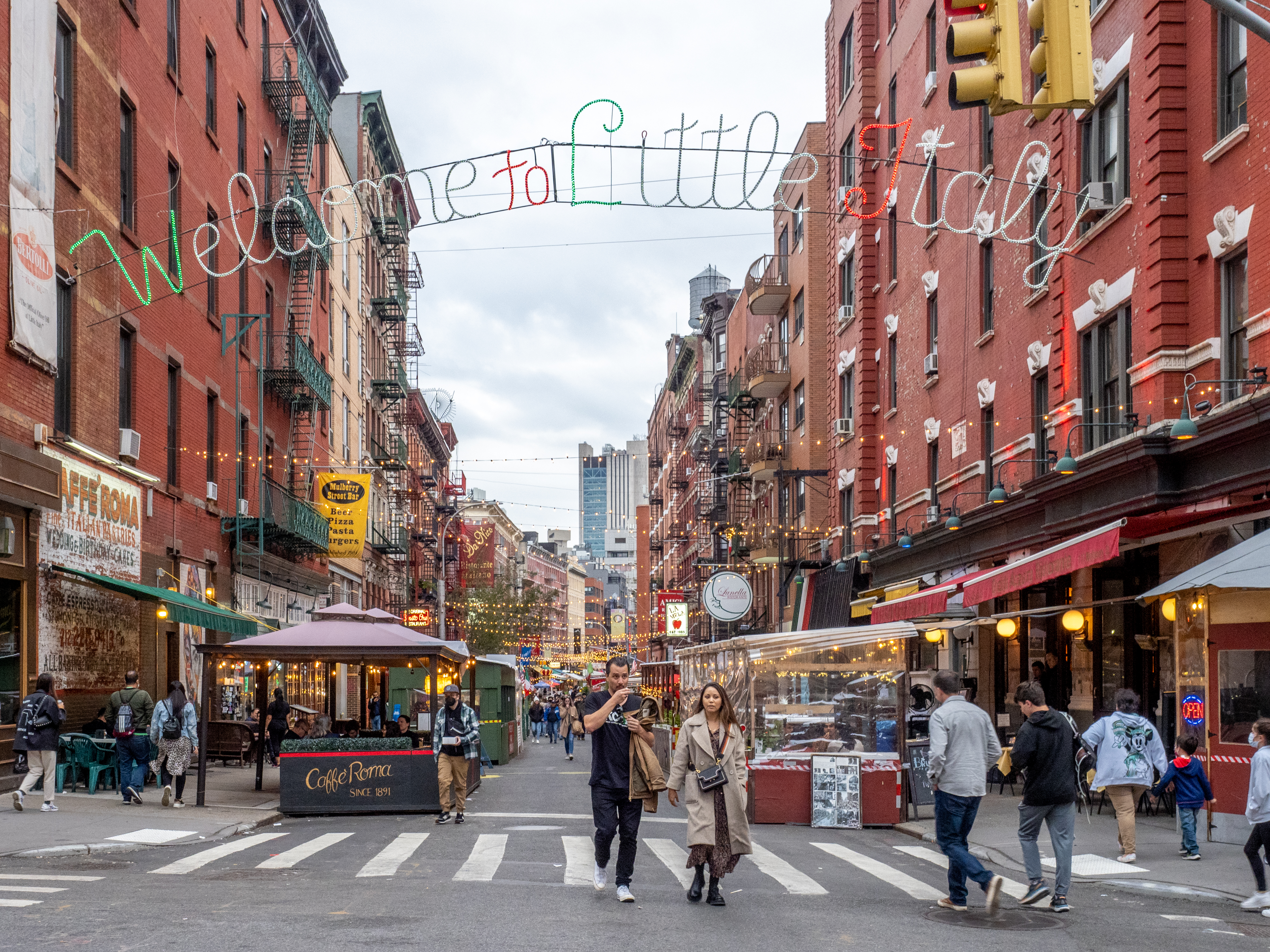
Little Italy in Manhattan, New York City, has been an Italian ethnic enclave for decades. The city also has other Little Italies such as Belmont in the Bronx and Bensonhurst in Brooklyn.

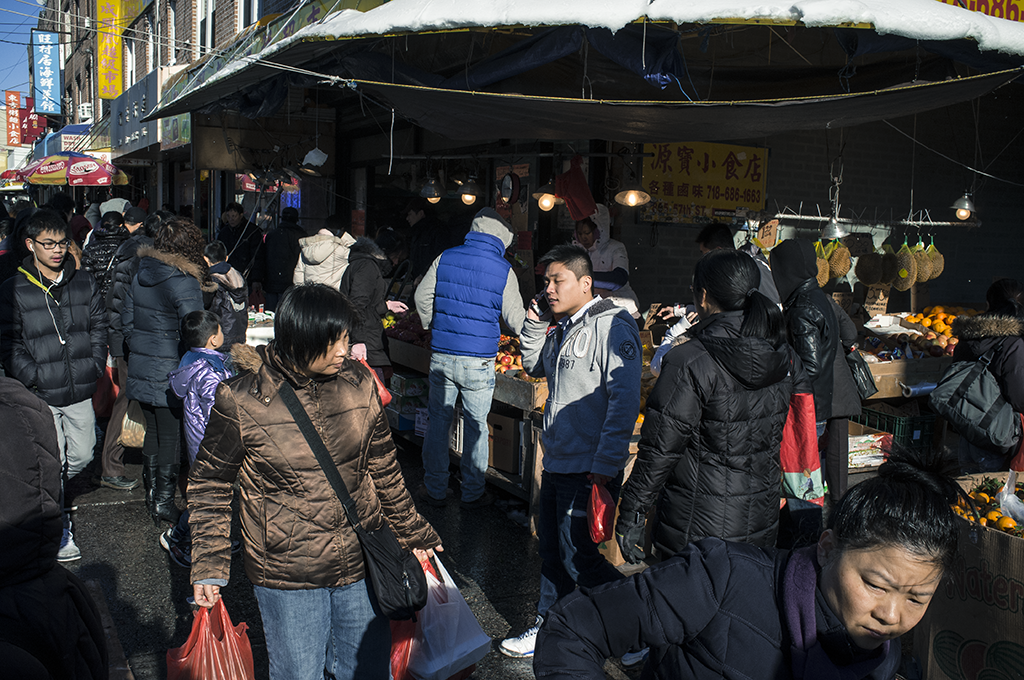
New York City is home to the largest overseas Chinese population of any city proper in the Western Hemisphere, with over half a million. The city has multiple large Chinatowns in Manhattan, Brooklyn (above), and Queens, which thrived as traditionally urban ethnic enclaves, as large-scale Chinese immigration poured into New York after World War II, with the most individuals of Chinese ancestry outside Asia.

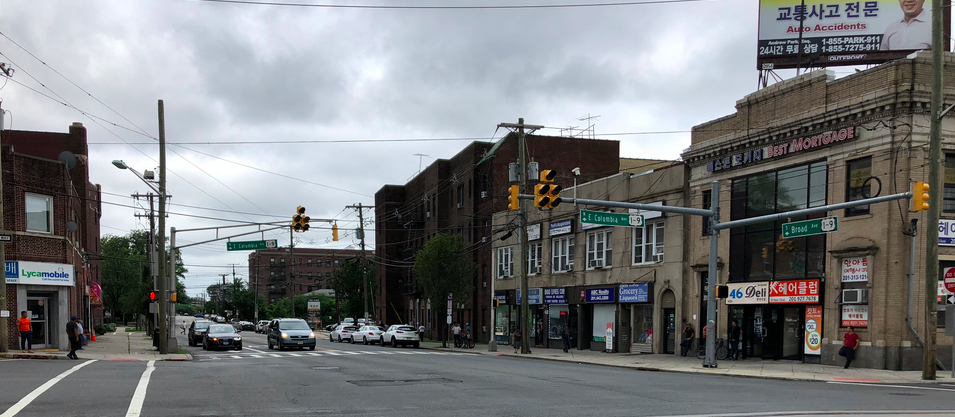
Broad Avenue, Koreatown in Palisades Park, New Jersey, United States, where Koreans comprise the majority (52%) of the population.

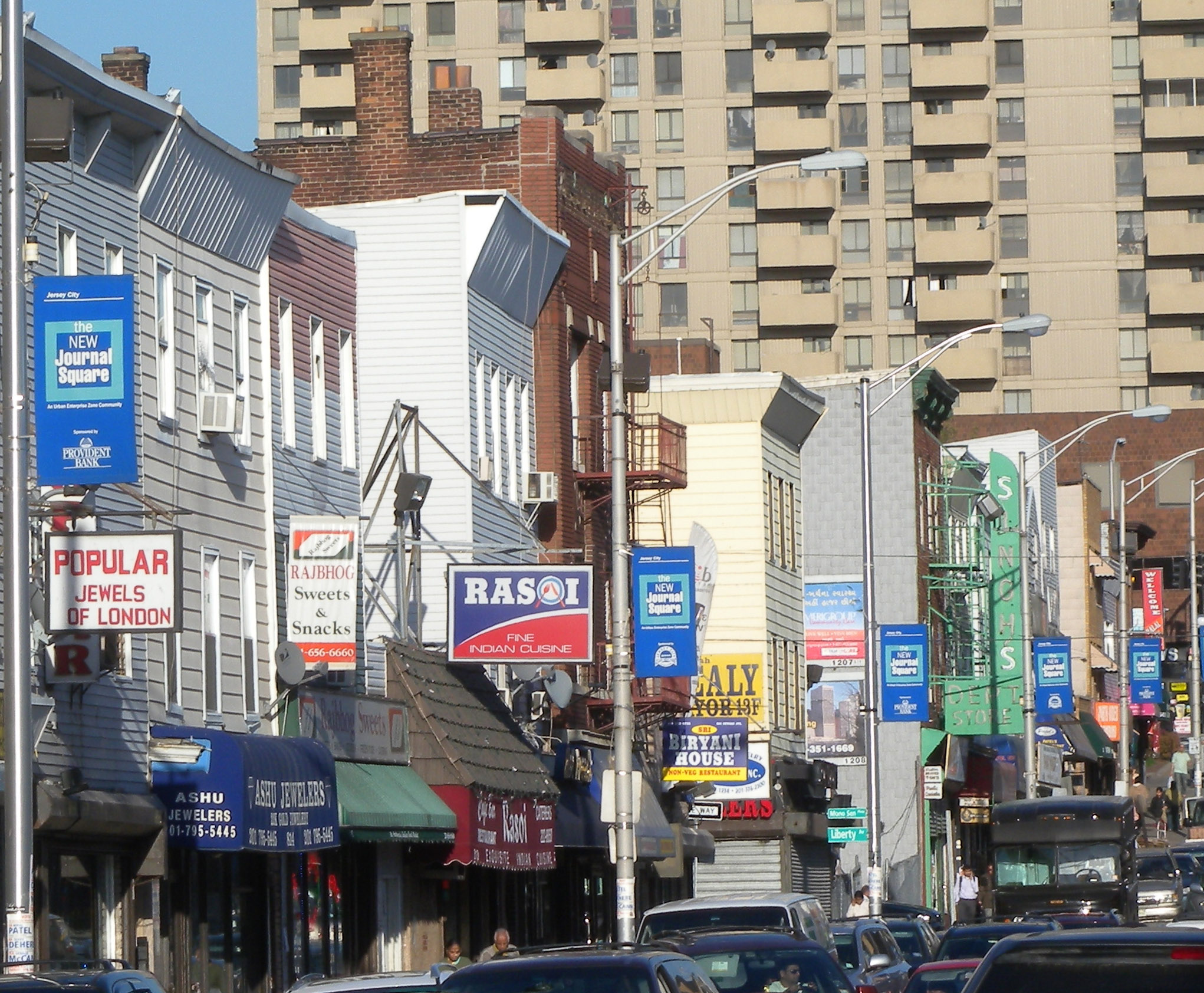
India Square in Jersey City, New Jersey, one of 24 Indian ethnic enclaves in the New York City Metropolitan Area.

Ethnic enclaves have been prominent urban features for centuries. Examples include a new Armenian one near Beirut, an old one in Bucharest, and an even older Armenian Quarter in Jerusalem. Urban quarters have often belonged mainly to residents having a particular sectarian or ethnic origin.

Historically, the formation of ethnic enclaves has been the result of a variety of socioeconomic factors that draw immigrants to similar spaces in the receiving city, state, or country. Cultural diversity brings together people who don't understand each other's language but a group can communicate more easily with neighbors in an enclave. In some cases, enclaves have been enforced by law, as in a ghetto. Roman colonies were established to control newly conquered provinces, and grew to absorb the surrounding territory. Some enclaves were established when a governing authority permitted a group to establish their own new town, as in the English town of Gravesend, Brooklyn in 1645.

The lack of access to economic capital and of knowledge regarding residential neighborhoods can constrain newly arrived immigrants to regions of affordable housing. Social dynamics such as prejudice and racism may concentrate co-ethnics into regions displaying ethnic similarity. Housing discrimination may also prevent ethnic minorities from settling into a particular residential area outside the enclave. When discussing the ethnic enclave as defined by a spatial cluster of businesses, economic success, and growth can be largely predicted by three factors. These factors include 1) the size and population of the enclave, 2) the level of entrepreneurial skills of those in the enclave, and 3) the availability of capital resources to the enclave. Successful enclaves can reach a point where they become self-sufficient, or "institutionally complete" through the supply of new immigrants and demand of goods offered in the market. They only reach this point after first supplying for the needs of co-ethnics and then expanding to meet needs of those in the larger market of the host society.

The term "ethnic enclave" arose in response to a publication by Alejandro Portes and Kenneth Wilson in 1980. Portes and Wilson identified a third labor market in which Cuban immigrants in Miami took part. Instead of entering the secondary labor market of the host society, Portes and Wilson discovered that new immigrants tended to become employed by co-ethnics running immigrant-owned firms. The collection of small immigrant enterprises providing employment to new immigrants was defined as the enclave economy.

== Theories ==
=== Enclave economy hypothesis ===
Observations of the Cuban ethnic enclave economy in Miami led Alejandro Portes and Kenneth Wilson to conclude that participation in an enclave economy provided immigrants with an alternative, speedy option to achieve economic mobility in a host society. The discourse pioneered by Portes and Wilson produced the construct for a body of literature that came to be known by the ethnic enclave hypothesis. While never empirically defined, the term "ethnic enclave" began to be widely used to represent two distinct definitions: that of an enclave economy and that of a residential area of high co-ethnic concentration. The most fundamental concept within the enclave hypothesis is that of social capital, which lays the foundation for the establishment of migrant networks and the advantages associated with them.

=== Cumulative causation ===
With the rise in globalization and ease of international transportation, patterns of immigration show the role of ethnic enclaves for contributing to increased migration over time. New immigrants unintentionally lower costs for future immigration of co-ethnics by pooling together resources for themselves. Thus, by achieving mobility in the receiving country themselves, immigrants create a social structure that makes it easier for future immigrants to become upwardly mobile. According to Douglas Massey, "Networks build into the migration process a self-perpetuating momentum that leads to its growth over time, in spite of fluctuating wage differentials, recessions, and increasingly restrictive immigration policies." Ethnic enclaves thus contribute to continued immigration by providing co-ethnics with a space to make connections that ultimately lower migration costs and promote economic mobility. Many worn path taken by former immigrants are made accessible to enclave members, making immigration easier to future generations. By generating further immigration, migration leads to its own cumulative causation over time.

== Modes of incorporation ==
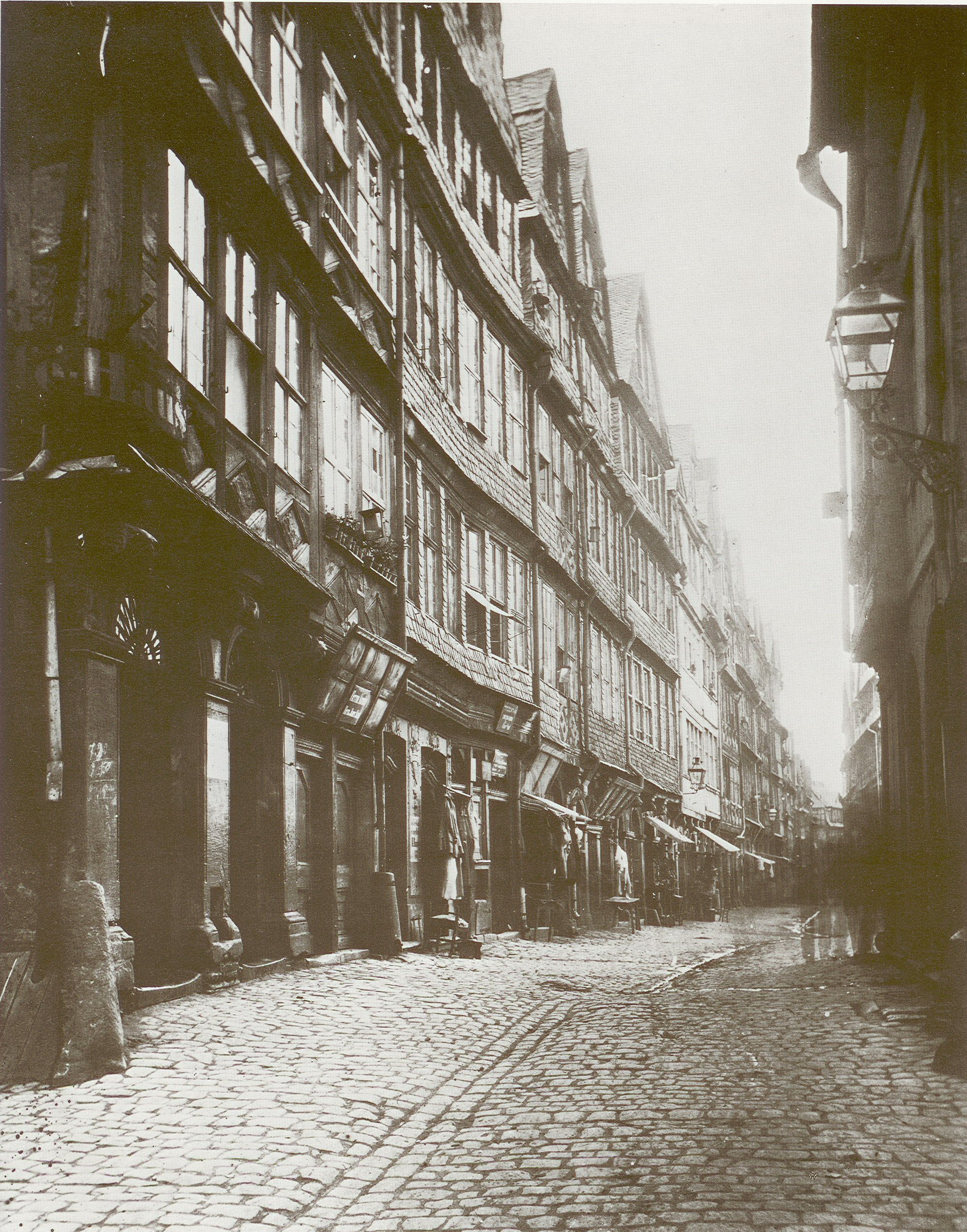
The Jewish Quarter of Frankfurt in 1868

An approach that analyzes ethnic enclaves and their members by their modes of incorporation is preferred to a neoclassical model, which states that the economic success of immigrants depends on the education, work experience, and other elements of human capital that they possess. Sociologists have concluded that these factors do not suffice in explaining the integration and success of immigrants measured by occupational mobility and earnings.

=== Social ===
Upon arrival to a foreign country, immigrants face challenges in assimilation and integration processes and thus experience different modes and levels of incorporation within the host society. Many factors influence the level of ease or challenge experienced by immigrants as they make the transition and undergo physical, social, and psychological challenges. The segmented assimilation model notes that there can exist a "consciously pluralistic society in which a variety of subcultures and racial and ethnic identities coexist"

One influential factor in an immigrant's journey is the presence of relatives or friends in the receiving country. Friends and family, making up a kinship network, who are willing to help the newcomers can be classified as a type of capital commonly referred to as social capital. Upon arrival, many immigrants have limited or no access to human capital and thus rely heavily on any available source of social capital. The cost to immigration is large, however this burden can be shared and thus eased through an immigrant's access to social capital in the receiving country. Kinship networks in the receiving country can provide aid not only for the physical and economic needs of immigrants, but also for their emotional and socio-psychological needs.

==== Quality of kinship networks ====
Access to social capital does not guarantee ease or success for the migrant. Because social capital is rooted in relationships it easily lends itself to conflict and disagreement between parties. The level of economic stability on the side of the receiving party can dictate the level of aid they are willing or able to offer. In addition, the economic condition of the country and the availability of jobs open to the immigrants can largely affect the quality of the support network available to the migrant. If the receiving country provides favorable conditions such as access to social programs, the local economy, and employment opportunities, the network is likely to be of much higher quality. Adversely, kinship networks may break down if much stress is placed on the relationships involved due to economic hardships. The duration and intensity of aid needed can dictate the quality of the kinship network available to the immigrant. Immigrant ideas regarding level of support to be received are often high and left unmet if true economic conditions do not allow for favorable network conditions. Shared norms and relational ties can also lead to obligatory ties which some scholars, such as Tsang and Inkpen, argue restricts an individual's willingness to explore opportunities outside the network.

==== Ethnic identity ====
Methods of assimilation and access to social capital vary between and even within ethnic groups. A variety of factors can influence individuals' ethnic identities including their social class background and the social networks available to them. As theorized by sociologist Mary C. Waters, the involvement level of parents in ethnic organizations or activities heavily influences the development of their children's ethnic identities. This is important to note as second-generation immigrants must actively work to identify themselves with their ethnic group.

==== Enclave networks ====
Enclave networks offer access to a unique type of social capital and act as large kinship networks. Within enclave networks, social capital commonly exists both as a private and public good. Though there is some debate in relation to the long-term benefits offered by these networks, the short-term benefits are universally acknowledged. The socio-psychological challenges faced by the immigrant can be largely reduced through the individual's entrance into an ethnic enclave. Ethnic enclaves can resemble the immigrant's place of origin through physical look, layout, and language employed both written and orally. In addition to increasing the cultural comfort of the migrant, healthy ethnic enclaves offer solidarity and trust among members, and informal training systems within the workplace. The geographic proximity of the enclave network allows for easy flow of knowledge and varying types of assistance between firms as well. Where there is an atmosphere of trust in ethnic enclaves, this transfer of knowledge and sharing of social capital exists as an asset to the firms. Connections with members in an enclave may also afford the newcomer work opportunities. Immigrants may also receive informal training regarding the customs and practices of the larger culture outside the enclave and help navigating challenges in many areas of everyday life. Social hostility may be a challenge faced by immigrants in their host society, therefore to avoid this factor, ethnic enclaves provide a haven where economic success may still be achieved.

=== Economic ===
Ethnic enclave economies are predicated upon aspects of economic sociology and the sociology of immigration. Ethnic Enclaves generate a pool of social capital through which members can access resources that lower the costs of migration. Enclave membership provides economic assistance such as job opportunities and small businesses loans. Small ethnic firms within the enclave provide new immigrants with immediate access to economic opportunities by subverting the secondary sector of the economy and creating numerous low-wage jobs that are easily accessed by members. The ethno-centric nature of businesses and firms provides easy integration into enclave economies. Goods and services tend to be offered in the ethnic group's language, while social and cultural norms specific to the host country are not required of employees in the enclave economy. Thus, the ethno-specific nature of enclave economies makes them attractive to new immigrants who are otherwise unable integrate into the mainstream economy.

Ethnic enclave economies also provide a method for immigrants who enter at lower wage jobs to rise to the status community entrepreneurs own firms within the community. While benefiting from the higher wages that owning a business provides them, these established immigrants continue the cycle of providing attractive (albeit lower income) labor to newcomers within the framework of the ethnic enclave. The ethnic enclave economy allows for a measure of independence for immigrants by creating a path for them to own businesses. Ethnic enclave economies also have the effect of raising the hourly wages of workers within the enclave.

An individual's entrance into the enclave economy is dependent upon the conditions of incorporation they experience. Unfavorable modes of incorporation into the host society provide incentives for immigrants to enter the informal economy. Discrimination, hostility, and a lack of resources may encourage immigrants to enter into informal employment. Ethnic enclaves are rich in informal activities, as the entrepreneurial services making the core of the enclave's founding were historically informal ventures. Informality proves favorable for many immigrant entrepreneurs by bypass regulatory expenses. Additionally, the scope of employment for immigrants is greatly widened by the availability of informal jobs in the enclave economic sector. The informality of the enclave economy simultaneously induces risk and fraud. Informal activities are constantly under risk of detection by the formal sector, which has a negative effect on job security. Furthermore, due to the absence of legal framework, immigrant laborers often remain silent about various forms of exploitation. The most common form of labor exploitation in immigrant economies is unpaid labor. Undocumented immigrants are especially afraid to report violations of labor laws and exploitation.

=== Political and civic involvement ===
Government policy toward immigrants is the first mode of reception to the receiving country. Governments generally enforce measures to reduce the amount of "unwanted" immigrants which may potentially pose a burden on the receiving society and economy.

The granting of different statuses and visas (i.e. refugee, temporary visas for students and workers) to immigrant groups affects the type of reception immigrants will receive. Aside from immigration control policies, some governments also impose measures to accelerate social and political incorporation of new immigrants, and to stimulate economic mobility.

Wayne Cornelius studies two central theses regarding institutional response to increased movement of people across transnational borders. The first of these is the gap hypothesis which describes the dissonance between official immigration policies and real policy outcomes. Policy gaps are the result of unintended consequences and inadequate enforcement by the receiving society. Many reasons can explain unintended consequences of immigration policy. Governments with undefined or ambiguous stances toward immigration may propagate unintended consequences, and the reliance on flawed policies can further reduce the efficacy of institutional measures. Furthermore, political incoherency policy poses a greater challenge for the incorporation and enforcement of effective measures.

A negative public opinion toward immigrants is a good measure of significant policy gaps in the receiving government; however, special interest groups may also constrain political responses to immigration. This is especially true in liberal democracies, where "lobbying by powerful employer groups, religious groups, ethnic and immigrant advocacy groups, and even labor unions leads governments to adopt more expansionary immigration policies, even when the economy goes bad and general public opinion turns hostile to immigrants." Furthermore, governments and special groups in the immigrant-sending country may align themselves with pro-immigration lobbyists in the receiving country. Thus, the policymaking process is complicated by involvement of multiple factions.

The second thesis studied by Wayne Cornelius is the convergence hypothesis, which describes the growing similarity of political responses to immigration among immigrant-receiving countries. These similarities fall into: "(1) the policies that their governments have adopted to control immigration; (2) policies designed to integrate immigrants into host societies by providing them with social services as well as political, economic, and social rights; and (3) attitudes toward immigrants and immigration policy preferences among general publics."

Ethnic groups receive various levels of reception by the host society for various reasons. In general, European immigrants tend to encounter little resistance by host countries, while tenets of racism are evinced by widespread resistance to immigrants of color.

Political incorporation into the host country is coupled with adoption of citizenship of the host country. By studying the diverging trajectories of immigrant citizenship in Canada and the U.S., Irene Bloemraad explains that current models of citizenship acquisition fail to recognize the social nature of political incorporation. Bloemraad describes political incorporation as a "social process of mobilization by friends, family, community organizations and local leaders that is embedded in an institutional context shaped by government policies of diversity and newcomer settlement." This alternative model emphasizes the role of migrant networks in critically shaping how immigrants consider citizenship. Bloemraad shows that friends, family, co-ethnic organizations and local community affect political incorporation by providing a structured mobilization framework. This social structure is most essential for immigrants who face language barriers and may lack familiarity with host institutions.

The extent to which migrant networks promote citizenship depends on the efficacy of government policies on immigrant integration. Governments adopting policies that facilitate the emergence, integration and growth of ethnic economies are presumed to gain support by co-ethnics. Thus, the movement toward political incorporation and citizenship is nested in a larger institutional structure involving economic and social integration policy as these relate to immigrants. Ethnic enclaves have the ability to simultaneously assist in political and civic incorporation of immigrants. By providing a space that facilitates upward mobility and economic integration into the receiving society, enclaves and their members fundamentally influence the perceptions of receiving institutions by co-ethnics. Finally, enclaves may gauge community interest in naturalization and direct immigrants through the process to gaining citizenship

== Ethnic enclave debate ==
Ethnic enclaves have prompted debate among scholars in two related areas of thought. Both areas discuss the role ethnic enclaves play by either offering aid or hindering the economic and social well-being of the enclave's members. One area of thought discusses the role of enclaves in assimilative patterns and upward mobility while the second area of thought argues the economic ramifications associated with membership within ethnic enclaves.

The immediate economic and social advantages associated with membership in an ethnic enclave are undisputed by scholars, however the long-term consequences remain an area of uncertainty. The role these networks play remains uncertain due to the fact that ethnic enclaves allow immigrants to function successfully within the host society without a significant amount of adjustment either culturally or linguistically. As such, they can either help or hinder naturalization within the host country. The relatively low levels of skill required allow immigrants to achieve financial stability which can in turn encourage eventual naturalization and assimilation. Adversely, this same factor can afford enclave members the opportunity to remain considerably segregated and secluded from the host society. As such, members may circumvent the need to acquire skills necessary for life in the larger host society such as knowledge of cultural norms and language.

The debate regarding the economic viability of ethnic enclaves revolves around the enclave-economy hypothesis. The hypothesis as written by Wilson and Portes formulates the idea that "[i]mmigrant workers are not restricted to the secondary labor market." They instead argue that "those inserted into an immigrant enclave can be empirically distinguished from workers in both the primary and secondary labor markets. Enclave workers will share with those in the primary sector a significant economic return past human capital investments" something those who enter the secondary labor market are not able to enjoy. Thus, they assert the enclave economy is not a mobility trap as some would term it, but an alternate mode of incorporation.

In their argument formulated to disprove the enclave economy hypothesis, Sanders and Nee state the need for a distinction between "immigrant-bosses" and "immigrant-workers" as the economic benefits differ along this distinction. They also call for the investigation of economic opportunities available to those in the enclave, believing them to be lesser in quality and supply. Sanders and Nee also assert the idea that segregation and forced entrance of immigrant-workers into low paying jobs is actually aggravated by the existence of ethnic enclaves. Due to these objections, they call for the revision of Portes and Wilson's hypothesis to include an acknowledgement and outline of the entrepreneur/worker economic benefit distinction.

In reaction to Sanders and Nee, Portes and Jensen make the clarification that those in ethnic enclaves need not be wealthier than those who left the enclave for the hypothesis to be supported. They instead assert that this will usually not be the case as the constant entrance of new immigrants into the enclave will actually be somewhat burdensome on the economy; a factor which does not actually represent disadvantage when compared with the other advantages provided. Additionally, Portes and Jensen outline three different conditions to be fulfilled in order to disprove their hypothesis. The first of these conditions requires the demonstration that ethnic entrepreneurship is a mobility trap leading to lower earnings than the immigrant's worth in human capital. The second condition requires data proving the work within the enclave to be exploitative, and the third condition requires data showing employment within the enclave leads to a 'dead end' and offers no chance of upward mobility. They acknowledge that the fulfillment of these three requirements is difficult as there is little data available to accurately test them.

Jennifer Lee adds to the discussion noting the particular niches and types of business immigrant groups enter. She notes that it is most common for immigrants to participate in long hours of physically demanding work in the retail industry. The retail market is a viable option due to the relatively low startup costs and knowledge of the host country's language required. Different niches have different levels of communication, for example the retail and self-service niche, (fruit and vegetable markets, take out restaurants) typically require the lowest level of customer interaction and communication. Lee notes the embeddedness of ethnic enclaves and brings the thought that such practices are good for those within the enclave but harmful to certain groups outside them. She also notes the adverse effects patterns of ethnic embeddedness can have on surrounding ethnic groups by noting the difficulty other groups face in joining the network. She argues that this type of retail niche domination can have positive consequences for co-ethnics, as Portes and Wilson believe, however can also have negative effects on surrounding ethnic groups who face exclusion due solely to their ethnic dissimilarity from the network.

== Ethnic enclaves in the United States ==
Immigration to the United States has occurred in waves that demonstrate the predominance of certain sets of ethnic minorities. As immigrants tended to cluster in certain cities and states, separate waves were responsible for the establishment of ethnic enclaves in separate physical spaces. The best-known ethnic enclaves in American cities began to appear with the arrival of large numbers of Irish immigrants during the first third of the nineteenth century and continued forming throughout that century and the twentieth as successive waves of immigrants arrived in the United States. In the early 20th century, immigrants chose to live in enclave neighborhoods because of language barriers and cost-of-living benefits. Sociologists Robert Park and Edward Burgess integrated a model that studied these patterns in the 1920s. This model showcased how immigrants who arrived in the U.S. in the early 20th century were drawn to urban enclave neighborhoods as they opened up opportunities for social networking and employment.

In 1998, nearly three quarters of all immigrants in the United States lived in California, New York, Texas, Florida, New Jersey or Illinois. Housing discrimination remains a factor in the persistence of racial enclaves in American cities. However, more recent patterns of migration, such as chain migration, challenge traditional methods of enclaves establishment.

A 2023 study found that 43% of the foreign-born population in the United States lived in ethnic neighborhoods in 1970. By 2010, this had risen to 67%. Ethnic neighborhoods tend to have lower average incomes and housing values, as well as more rental housing and more inhabitants that commute without a car.

Most ethnic neighborhoods in the United States disappear within a decade or two, as immigrants gain language abilities, cultural skills, and resources and subsequently move elsewhere.

== Historical ethnic enclaves ==
Ethnic enclaves have become commonplace in modern times, with the increase in the geographic mobility of humankind. However, they have also arisen in historical times, for various reasons. The village of Schandorf, now in Austria, was for centuries a Croatian ethnic enclave, surrounded by areas of Austrian and Hungarian ethnicity. The enclave originated around 1543 when the Hungarian magnate Batthyany sought to repopulate lands that had been emptied by devastating Turkish attacks; he invited Croatian settlers. The town of Alghero in Sardinia still marginally preserves a Catalan ethnic enclave; this dates from a military conquest of the town by Catalans in the 14th century. Ethnic enclaves also arose when a people remained in its original territory but came to be surrounded by a far more numerous majority, as in the case of Vepsians and Russians. The city of Hat Yai in southern Thailand has been an ethnic enclave for Malay Muslims and Chinese immigrants from the 19th century onwards. Budaya Pampang in Indonesia was an ethnic enclave for the Kenyah people who migrated from present-day Malinau and West Kutai in the 1960s, after rejecting to join the newly-formed country of Malaysia.

== See also ==
- List of ethnic enclaves in North American cities
- List of ethnic enclaves in Philippine cities
- Ethnoburb
- Ghetto
- Bantustan
- Language island
