= Rubén G. Rumbaut =

American sociologist

Rubén G. Rumbaut is a prominent Cuban-American sociologist and a leading expert on immigration and refugee resettlement in the United States. He is Distinguished Professor of Sociology at the University of California, Irvine.

== Education and employment ==
Since 2002, Rumbaut has served as on the sociology faculty at the University of California, Irvine. In 2015, he was awarded the title Distinguished Professor of Sociology. He is also formally affiliated with the departments of Education; Criminology, Law and Society; and Chicano-Latino Studies. Previously, he held professor roles at the University of California, San Diego, San Diego State University, and Michigan State University. Rumbaut earned a B.A. in sociology-anthropology from Washington University in St. Louis and an M.A. in sociology from San Diego State University. He received a Ph.D. in sociology from Brandeis University in 1978. He was a visiting scholar at the Russell Sage Foundation in New York City in 1997-98 and a fellow at the Center for Advanced Study in the Behavioral Sciences at Stanford in 2000–01.

== Scholarly work ==
Rumbaut is best known for his research on immigration and refugee movements, generations, and transitions to adulthood. For more than three decades, he has directed seminal comparative empirical studies of the adaptation of immigrants and refugees in the United States. He directed (with Alejandro Portes) the landmark Children of Immigrants Longitudinal Study (CILS), begun in 1991; and, in collaboration with a multidisciplinary team, the Immigration and Intergenerational Mobility in Metropolitan Los Angeles (IIMMLA) study. He also directed the first National Survey of Immigration Scholars (NASIS) in the United States. In the 1980s, he directed the principal studies of the migration and incorporation of refugees from Vietnam, Laos, and Cambodia—the Indochinese Health and Adaptation Research Project (IHARP) and the Southeast Asian Refugee Youth Study. He has traveled to Vietnam and Cambodia, and earlier to Sierra Leone, where he organized a field project on international health and economic development. In the 1990s, he was academic advisor for a 10-part PBS television series, Americas, focusing on Latin American and Caribbean societies, as well as on Mexicans, Cubans and Puerto Ricans in the U.S. In the 2000s, as a member of a panel of the National Academy of Sciences, he worked on two volumes on the Hispanic population of the United States: "Multiple Origins, Uncertain Destinies," and "Hispanics and the Future of America."

Rumbaut is known as one of the original architects of the segmented-assimilation paradigm of immigrant incorporation. Developed in the 1990s, the paradigm argues that the experiences of recent immigrant groups are more diverse than either the classic assimilation or ethnic disadvantage perspectives suggests. It posits three alternative pathways for the children of immigrants.

The first is the conventional upward trajectory toward assimilation. The second is a process called selective acculturation, in which some groups try to inspire achievement in their children by referencing the traditional values of the home country, such as a dedication to education. The third and most controversial pathway is known as downward mobility, in which members of the most disadvantaged groups face substantial structural barriers to advancement, such as poor urban schools and employment discrimination. Children in these disadvantaged contexts may become racialized or turn to attitudes and behaviors considered oppositional to the mainstream, such as rejecting school or joining a street gang. The extent to which downward mobility is occurring remains contested and has inspired many studies. Because educational attainment is a primary marker of immigrant mobility, much of this research focuses on the education of immigrants' children.

He has published over 150 articles and book chapters, and a dozen books, two of which have been translated into other languages. Among his books are the critically acclaimed Immigrant America: A Portrait (with Alejandro Portes; 3rd ed. 2006); and two companion books based on Children of Immigrants Longitudinal Study (also with Portes): Ethnicities: Children of Immigrants in America, and Legacies: The Story of the Immigrant Second Generation.

== Honors and awards ==
In 1998, Rumbaut was elected to the Sociological Research Association. In 2002, Legacies: The Story of the Immigrant Second Generation, won both the American Sociological Association's top award for Distinguished Scholarship and the Thomas and Znaniecki Award for best book in the immigration field. In 2013, Rumbaut was honored with election to the National Academy of Education. In 2014, he received the Distinguished Career Award from the American Sociological Association's Section on International Migration. In 2015, he was named Distinguished Professor of Sociology at the University of California, Irvine, and subsequently elected to the American Academy of Arts and Sciences.

== Service ==
Rumbaut has founded or participated in multiple organizations related to his work. He is the founding chair of the Section on International Migration of the American Sociological Association, and an elected member of the ASA's Council, the Committee on Population of the National Academy of Sciences, the Committee on International Migration of the Social Science Research Council, the MacArthur Research Network on Transitions to Adulthood and Public Policy, and the Sociological Research Association. A native of Havana, Cuba, he has examined the Cuban diaspora and the history of U.S.-Cuba relations, and has been active as a founding director of ENCASA and as a founding member of UC-CUBA. He has testified at Congressional Hearings on Comprehensive Immigration Reform. In addition, he has served on the editorial boards of the American Journal of Sociology, International Migration Review, Sociology of Education, The Sociological Quarterly, Sociological Perspectives, Journal of Immigrant and Minority Health, The American Sociologist, and Contexts, among others.

== Selected books ==
Immigrant America: A Portrait (with Alejandro Portes). New third edition, revised, expanded, and updated. University of California Press. 2006.

On the Frontier of Adulthood: Theory, Research, and Public Policy (with Rick Settersten and Frank Furstenberg). University of Chicago Press. 2005.

Legacies: The Story of the Immigrant Second Generation (with Alejandro Portes). U. of California Press and Russell Sage Foundation. 2001.

Ethnicities: Children of Immigrants in America (with Alejandro Portes). U. of California Press and Russell Sage Foundation. 2001.

Immigration Research for a New Century: Multidisciplinary Perspectives (with Nancy Foner and Steven J. Gold). Russell Sage Foundation. 2000.

Origins and Destinies: Immigration, Race, and Ethnicity in America (with Silvia Pedraza). 1996.

California's Immigrant Children: Theory, Research, and Implications for Educational Policy (with Wayne Cornelius). 1995.

== Selected essays ==
Assimilation's Bumpy Road. 2011.

Immigration and Adult Transitions. The Future of Children. 2010.

Pigments of Our Imagination: On the Racialization and Racial Identities of "Hispanics" and "Latinos." 2009.

The Coming of the Second Generation: Immigration and Ethnic Mobility in Southern California. The Annals. 2008.

On the Past and Future of American Immigration and Ethnic History. Journal of American Ethnic History. 2006.

Ages, Life Stages, and Generational Cohorts. International Migration Review. 2004.

"Immigration Research in the United States: Social Origins and Future Orientations." American Behavioral Scientist. 1999.

"Paradoxes (and Orthodoxies) of Assimilation." Sociological Perspectives. 1997.

Ties that Bind: Immigration and Immigrant Families. 1997.

Unraveling a Public Health Enigma: Why Do Immigrants Experience Superior Perinatal Health Outcomes? (with John R. Weeks). Research in the Sociology of Health Care. 1996.

"The New Californians: Comparative Research Findings on the Educational Progress of Immigrant Children." 1995.

Origins and Destinies: Immigration to the United States Since World War II. Sociological Forum. 1994.

The Crucible Within: Ethnic Identity, Self-Esteem, and Segmented Assimilation Among Children of Immigrants. International Migration Review. 1994.

"Migration, Adaptation, and Mental Health: The Experience of Southeast Asian Refugees in the United States." 1991.

"The Structure of Refuge: Southeast Asian Refugees in the United States." International Review of Comparative Public Policy. 1989.

"Fertility and Adaptation: Indochinese Refugees in the United States." (with John R. Weeks). International Migration Review. 1986.
