= Enrique Ruíz-Williams =

Cuban exile (1922–1996)

Harry Williams
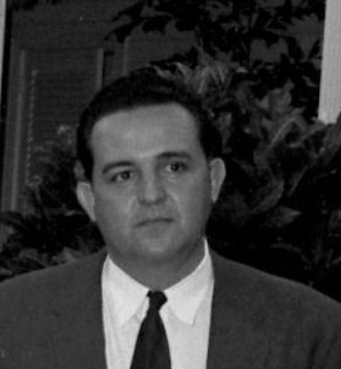
- Ruíz-Williams in 1962
- Born: 1922; Cuba
- Died: March 10, 1996 (Aged 74); United States
- Military career
- Branch: Central Intelligence Agency; United States Army; Brigade 2506
- Conflicts: Cold War; Bay of Pigs Invasion; Playa Giron; Playa Larga
- Other work: Cuban Families Committee

Enrique (Harry) Ruíz-Williams was a Cuban-born exile living in the United States who was second in command of the heavy weapons battalion of Brigade 2506 during the Bay of Pigs Invasion. During the invasion, Williams unsuccessfully attempted a point-blank range assassination of Fidel Castro. Williams infamously set a quota during the invasion that each man of his unit should kill at least fifteen enemy combatants. After the failed invasion, Williams became a close friend of Robert (Bobby) F. Kennedy, and worked with Kennedy and Allen Dulles to release the remaining members of the invasion that were still held in Cuban prisons.

== Early life and mining ==
Williams was born in Cuba in 1922. His father was in the mining business, and was a civil engineer. His father was also at some point the Minister of Public Works.

Williams was trained at the Colorado School of Mines, and graduated in 1945. He was a certified mining engineer by trade. Williams eventually became the general manager of the Matahambre copper mines in Pinar del Río Province, the largest copper mining operation in all of Cuba.

== Cuban Revolution ==
During the Cuban Revolution, Williams worked with Che Guevara to overthrow the Cuban dictator Fulgencio Batista. Williams also hid dynamite in the Sierra Maestra mountains, and helped Fidel Castro and his rebels with supplies.

In December 1958, Williams was discovered by the government and left the country. He moved with his wife and son to Chicago.

In 1959, after the success of the Cuban Revolution, Ruíz-Williams returned to Cuba and "soon became disillusioned with the violence and repression of Castro." This became especially true when Castro seized and nationalized Cuba's mines, including the Matahambre mines.

== Brigade 2506 and the Bay of Pigs ==
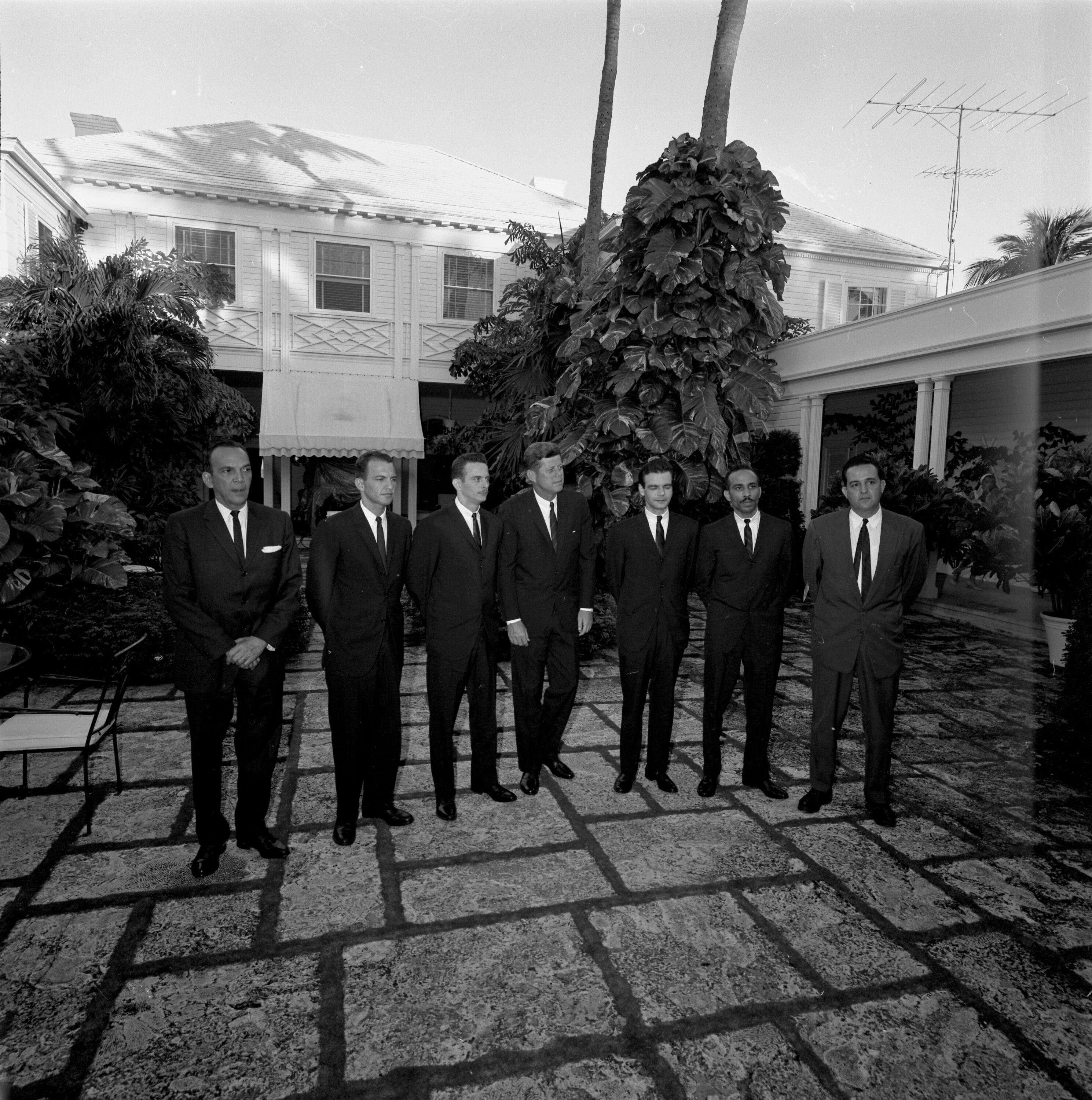
(left to right): Alvaro Sanchez, Jr., Roberto Pérez San Román, Jose Pérez San Román, President Kennedy, Manuel Artime, Erneido Oliva, and Enrique Ruiz-Williams

In 1960, Williams left Cuba and moved permanently to the United States. He worked with Manuel Artime, Tony Varona, Rafael Quintero, Aureliano Arango and Jose Cardona to establish the Movement for the Recovery of the Revolution (MMR).

Members of the MMR joined Brigade 2506 to invade Cuba during the Bay of Pigs Invasion, and Williams was among them.

During the invasion, Williams was hit by shrapnel, hit by mortars, hit by bullets, and was wounded seventy times during the course of the operation. Two of his ribs were broken, he had a hole near his heart, a hole in his neck, and his feet were completely smashed. He was also unable to move his left arm.

Williams was standing next to a man named Oscar Vila when a shell landed on them – Oscar died immediately, but Williams survived.

A casualty evacuation was performed using a jeep, but Williams insisted that his men be taken out first.

One of the men in his unit recalled of Williams:

"I found him in front of me in the jeep, lying there bleeding all over, as if he had exploded inside. He was lying there as a person that is going to die very soon..."

Williams was taken to recover on a cot in a concrete beach house occupied by the invasion forces at Playa Giron. While he was recovering from his wounds, the house was breached by Fidel Castro and several of his police officers. Williams recognized Castro immediately and reached under his pillow to grab a .45 pistol, attempting to kill the Cuban leader. However, the other recovering men in the room remember that Williams only made a gesture to kill Castro, and was so delirious from his wounds that he thought he was holding an actual weapon that misfired.

Fidel Castro said to Williams: "What are you trying to do, kill me?"

Williams replied: "That's what I came here for. We've been trying to do that for three days."

A captain of the militia police patted-down Williams and said: "Take it easy. Take it easy. You're in bad shape."

Fidel Castro's official account of the events at Playa Giron confirms the story of the above encounter.

After discovering that there were no Americans in the house, Castro had Williams and the rest of the recovering men moved to the hospital at Covadonga. By May Day of 1961, Williams had been moved to the hospital at Matanzas. Williams was later moved to the Sanatorio (Sanatorium) prison area of the Castillo del Príncipe, with the rest of Brigade 2506.

Being a wounded prisoner, Williams was one of the first men of Brigade 2506 to return to the United States, landing in Miami, where they issued a statement to the press. Williams was the last one to leave the plane after it landed.

Williams spent the rest of his recovery at Mercy Hospital in Miami, but he still had shrapnel in his body when he left. He had shrapnel in his body for the rest of his life, and doctors would not operate on his smashed feet.

Williams worked with Allen Dulles, James B. Donovan, Bobby Kennedy and Alvaro Sanchez, Jr. to return the rest of the Brigade to the United States. They formed the "Cuban Families Committee," which was the committee dedicated to returning the Bay of Pigs prisoners.

== CIA ==
After the last Brigade 2506 prisoners were returned to the United States, Williams was involved in the CIA's efforts in the Caribbean region and Latin America in some capacity. Both of his handlers, E. Howard Hunt and James W. McCord Jr., asked Williams to call them "Don Eduardo."

== Later life ==
Williams later consoled Bobby after the assassination of his brother, President John F. Kennedy. However, Bobby told Williams over the phone that "One of your men did this." It is as yet unclear who Bobby was referring to.

Williams and many other members of the failed Bay of Pigs operation planned alongside the Central Intelligence Agency and the Kennedy brothers a second invasion of Cuba called AMWORLD – but this operation was cancelled after the assassination of President Kennedy. This operation was also sabotaged by the Mafia.

Williams died on March 10, 1996.
