= 1981 Major League Baseball draft =

Baseball draft of amateur players by Major League Baseball

General information
- Date: June 1981

Overview
- 853 total selections
- First selection: Mike Moore; Seattle Mariners
- First round selections: 26
- Hall of Famers: 2: RF Tony Gwynn; 1B Fred McGriff

The 1981 Major League Baseball draft took place in June 1981. The draft saw the Seattle Mariners select Mike Moore first overall.

== First round selections ==
= All-Star	= Baseball Hall of Famer

The following are the first round picks in the 1981 Major League Baseball draft.

Pick	Player	Team	Position	Hometown/School
1	Mike Moore	Seattle Mariners	Pitcher	Oral Roberts
2	Joe Carter	Chicago Cubs	Outfield	Wichita State
3	Dick Schofield	California Angels	Shortstop	Griffin High School
4	Terry Blocker	New York Mets	Outfield	Tennessee State
5	Matt Williams	Toronto Blue Jays	Pitcher	Rice
6	Kevin McReynolds	San Diego Padres	Outfield	Arkansas
7	Daryl Boston	Chicago White Sox	Outfield	Woodward High School
8	Bobby Meacham	St. Louis Cardinals	Shortstop	San Diego State
9	Ron Darling	Texas Rangers	Pitcher	Yale
10	Mark Grant	San Francisco Giants	Pitcher	Joliet Catholic High School
11	Mike Sodders	Minnesota Twins	Third Base	Arizona State
12	Jay Roberts	Atlanta Braves	Outfield	Centralia High School
13	George Alpert	Cleveland Indians	Outfield	Livingston High School (NJ)
14	Jim Winn	Pittsburgh Pirates	Pitcher	John Brown University
15	Tim Pyznarski	Oakland Athletics	Third Base	Eastern Illinois
16	Vance Lovelace	Chicago Cubs (Note: Pick from Cincinnati Reds as compensation for signing of free agent Larry Biittner)	Pitcher	Hillsborough High School (FL)
17	Ricky Barlow	Detroit Tigers	Pitcher	Woodville High School (Woodville, TX)
18	Darren Dilks	Montreal Expos	Pitcher	Oklahoma State
19	Steve Lyons	Boston Red Sox	Shortstop	Oregon State
20	Johnny Abrego	Philadelphia Phillies	Pitcher	Mission High School (CA)
21	John Cerutti	Toronto Blue Jays (Note: Pick from Milwaukee Brewers as compensation for signing of free agent Roy Howell)	Pitcher	Amherst College
22	Dave Anderson	Los Angeles Dodgers	Shortstop	Memphis
23	Dave Leeper	Kansas City Royals	Outfield	USC
24	Al Lachowicz	Texas Rangers (Note: Pick from Houston Astros as compensation for signing of free agent Dave Roberts)	Pitcher	Pittsburgh
25	Kevin Burrell	Boston Red Sox (Note: Pick from Baltimore Orioles as compensation for signing of free agent Jim Dwyer)	Catcher	Poway High School
26	Frank Castro	San Diego Padres (Note: Pick from New York Yankees as compensation for signing of free agent Dave Winfield)	Catcher	Miami (FL)

== Other notable players ==
- Darrin Jackson, 2nd round, 28th overall by the Chicago Cubs
- Mike Gallego, 2nd round, 33rd overall by the Oakland Athletics
- Mark Gubicza†, 2nd round, 34th overall by the Kansas City Royals
- Mark Langston†, 2nd round, 35th overall by the Seattle Mariners
- Frank Viola†, 2nd round, 37th overall by the Minnesota Twins
- Neal Heaton†, 2nd round, 39th overall by the Cleveland Indians
- Sid Bream, 2nd round, 48th overall by the Los Angeles Dodgers
- John Elway, 2nd round, 52nd overall by the New York Yankees
- Phil Bradley†, 3rd round, 53rd overall by the Seattle Mariners
- Tony Gwynn‡, 3rd round, 58th overall by the San Diego Padres
- Sid Fernandez†, 3rd round, 73rd overall by the Los Angeles Dodgers
- David Cone†, 3rd round, 74th overall by the Kansas City Royals
- Curt Young, 4th round, 92nd overall by the Oakland Athletics
- Paul O'Neill†, 4th round, 93rd overall by the Cincinnati Reds
- Todd Benzinger, 4th round, 96th overall by the Boston Red Sox
- Shane Mack, 4th round, 100th overall by the Kansas City Royals, but did not sign
- Eric Plunk, 4th round, 103rd overall by the New York Yankees
- Bip Roberts, 5th round, 117th overall by the Pittsburgh Pirates, but did not sign
- Mickey Tettleton†, 5th round, 118th overall by the Oakland Athletics
- Bill Wegman, 5th round, 124th overall by the Milwaukee Brewers
- John Franco†, 5th round, 125th overall by the Los Angeles Dodgers
- Devon White†, 6th round, 132nd overall by the California Angels
- Alvin Davis†, 6th round, 144th overall by the Oakland Athletics, but did not sign
- Mike Pagliarulo, 6th round, 155th overall by the New York Yankees
- Mark McGwire†, 8th round, 199th overall by the Montreal Expos, but did not sign
- Steve Lombardozzi, 9th round, 218th overall by the Minnesota Twins
- Fred McGriff‡, 9th round, 233rd overall by the New York Yankees
- Roger Clemens†, 12th round, 289th overall by the New York Mets, but did not sign
- Lenny Dykstra†, 13th round, 315th overall by the New York Mets
- Danny Cox, 13th round, 319th overall by the St. Louis Cardinals
- Bob Tewksbury†, 19th round, 493rd overall by the New York Yankees
- Matt Nokes†, 20th round, 503rd overall by the San Francisco Giants
- Vince Coleman, 20th round, 513th overall by the Philadelphia Phillies, but did not sign
- Al LeBoeuf, 28th round, 705th overall by the Philadelphia Phillies
- Chris Bosio, 29th round, 722nd overall by the Pittsburgh Pirates, but did not sign
- Lance Johnson, 30th round, 742nd overall by the Pittsburgh Pirates, but did not sign
- Cecil Fielder, 31st round, 767th overall by the Baltimore Orioles, but did not sign

† All-Star
‡ Hall of Famer

=== NFL players drafted ===
- John Elway, 2nd round, 52nd overall by the New York Yankees
- Jack Del Rio, 22nd round, 550th overall by the Toronto Blue Jays, but did not sign

Preceded by Darryl Strawberry	1st Overall Picks; Mike Moore	Succeeded by Shawon Dunston
