= Sports Leadership and Management Charter School =

School in Miami, Florida, United States

Coordinates: 25°46′45″N 80°12′54.5″W

Sports Leadership and Management Charter School (SLAM) is a public charter school for intermediate and secondary grade levels in Little Havana, Miami, Florida.

There are two other SLAM campuses: By 2015 the Henderson, Nevada campus opened, and in 2016 the West Palm Beach, Florida campus opened.

The rapper Pitbull founded SLAM, which opened in 2013. He chose to focus the school on vocational studies to attract students who were uninterested in academic subjects. He formed a partnership between the school and the Miami Marlins.

== Programs ==
By 2021 the Miami campus had the only high school student-operated SiriusXM station.
