= Frank Castro =

Cuban exile (1942–2003)

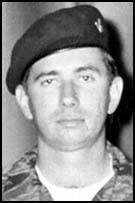
- Born: Eulalio Francisco Castro Paz; 1942; Cuba
- Died: 2003 (aged 60–61); Miami
- Spouse: Martica Pérez
- Children: Frank Pérez Jr.
- Military career
- Branch: Republic of Cuba Air Force; Central Intelligence Agency; United States Army; Brigade 2506
- Nickname: Frank Pérez
- Conflicts: Cold War; Bay of Pigs Invasion

Eulalio Francisco Castro Paz, better known as Frank Castro or Frank Pérez, was a Cuban-American anticommunist revolutionary, gang leader, arms dealer, terrorist group leader, intelligence operative, undercover agent, drug and narcotics smuggler, decades-long jewelry store owner, and pillar of the Little Havana community who has a street named after him in Miami.

Frank was a Cuban-born exile living in the United States who worked for the Central Intelligence Agency and as a member of Brigade 2506 participated in the Bay of Pigs Invasion. Frank was a vocal critic of the Castro regime, and was a staunch anticommunist and anti-Castro activist (activista anticastra). Castro hated Fidel Castro most of all, and spent his adult life in exile trying to topple his government in Cuba.

== Life ==
Prior to the Cuban Revolution, Frank was a pilot in the Republic of Cuba Air Force. After the Revolution, Frank Castro escaped to Chicago, where he lived until the Bay of Pigs Invasion. After the invasion failed, the members of brigade 2506 were held in Cuban prison until John F. Kennedy was able to negotiate their release from prison.

Frank, who went by Frank Pérez in his civilian life (the surname Castro often caused confusion), quickly became a jewelry store owner and community leader in Little Havana. The jewelry store that Frank started after being released from Cuban prison was called "Frank Joyeria," and is still managed by his two sons. In May 2024, city of Miami Commissioner Joe Carollo designated a street in the community to be named "Frank Perez Avenue."

Eventually, Frank became the leader of the Cuban National Liberation Front (FLNC), and planned several bombings in the Caribbean. The United States Attorney's Office would call him the "most [dangerous] militant Cuban exile" in the world. Frank was also the leader of CORU.

According to the Federal Bureau of Investigation:

"Cuban National Liberation Front is a Cuban exile terrorist organization which was formed on October 1973, when several leaders from different groups participated in a sea attack against a Government of Cuba fishing boat. FLNC has claimed credit for about 25 acts of terrorism...

...Frank Castro, present leader of CORU... has reportedly stated that CORU needs to plant magnetic type bombs on communist country ships in four different ports, and on simultaneous dates of departure. Further, such devices should have 24 hour delay activators causing explosions well after the victim ship leaves the port. This would increase any chances for the destruction of any evidence."

While he was the leader of CORU, the organization planned kidnappings, bombings, targeted assassinations, and funded their activities through illegal smuggling of drugs, weapons, and narcotics. Frank was known to many as a drug kingpin, and is known to have had associations with Pablo Escobar and other narcotics dealers in the region. However, from direct sources, Frank readily admitted that he was only selling drugs to raise money for "the Revolution," and the overthrow of Fidel Castro. In 1976, Frank created two satellite branches of CORU: in Miami, the Youth of the Star, and in New York City, the "F-14."

He is recognized today by the government of Cuba as a terrorist. He was implicated in the CORU terrorist bombing of Cubana de Aviación Flight 455 in October 1976 over Barbados, having been himself a co-founder and the leader of CORU. He was later implicated in the Iran–Contra affair, however there is no evidence that he was a Contra - but he did sell narcotics to raise money for the Contras, and he did find the weapons to arm the guerrilla movement.

He has been accused of being involved in the Watergate scandal, as the FLNC was involved in the break-in.

The mercenary Karl Penta writes in his memoirs that Frank Castro was also a leader of Alpha 66:

"All the weapons came out: MAGs, Minimees, they even had a fifty-calibre mounted on an observation tower set up at the airfield. All the boys looked the part in uniforms with jungle boots and webbing full of ammunition, all courtesy of Frank Castro."
