= Bay of Pigs Museum =

Museum in Florida

Coordinates: 25.764989°N 80.225059°W

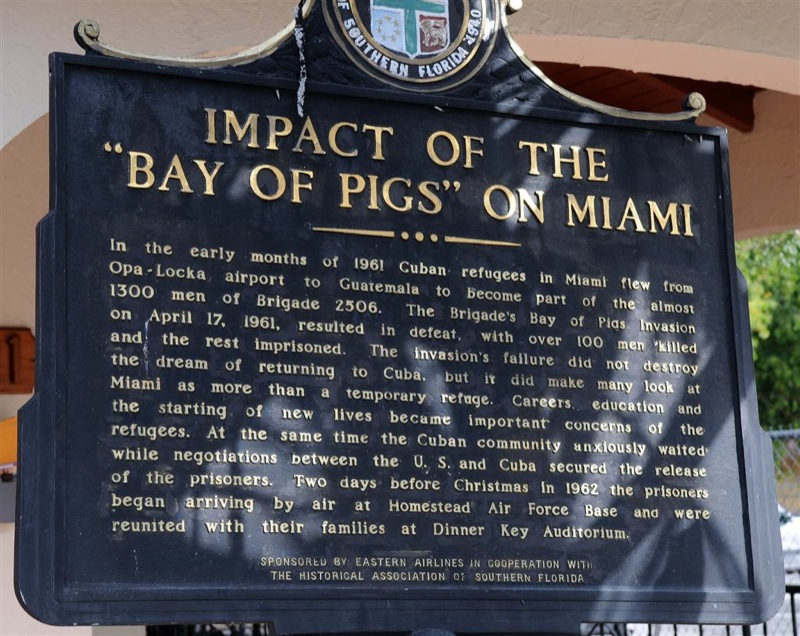
- Historical marker

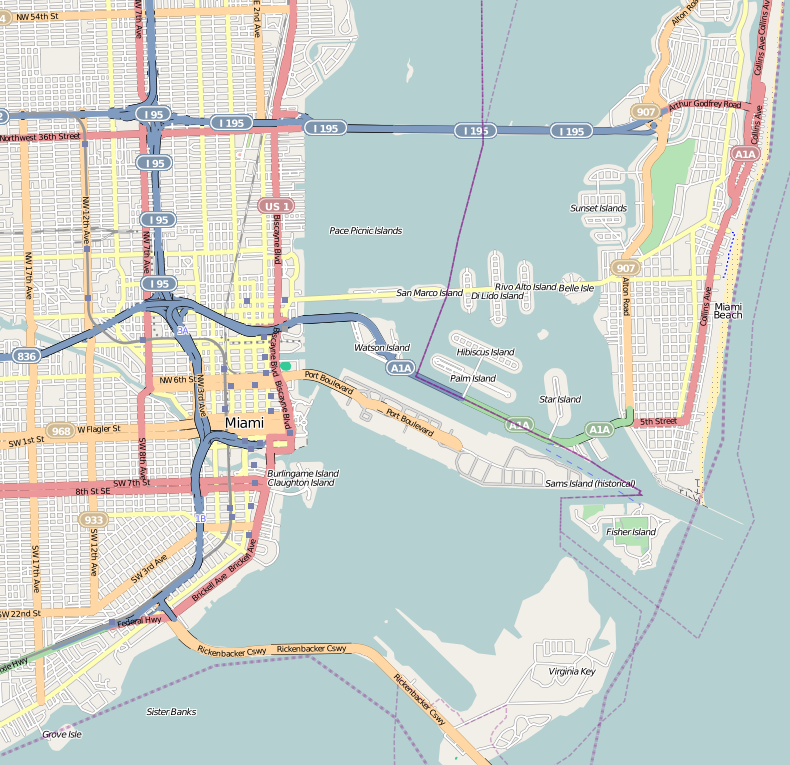
- Location within Central Miami Location within Florida
- Established: 1988
- Location: Miami, Florida, US

The Bay of Pigs Museum, also known as the Brigade 2506 Museum and Library, is the official museum in memory of the Bay of Pigs Invasion's Brigade 2506 in Little Havana, Miami, Florida.

== History ==
In September 1987, Arnhilda Gonzalez-Quevedo, the Republican member of the Florida House of Representatives for Coral Gables, presented the museum founders with $75,000 from the state of Florida for its construction. The museum was inaugurated on April 17, 1986, at 1821 SW 9th Street in Little Havana, Miami by over 400 attendees, including politicians, Brigade 2506 veterans and Cuban exiles.

The Bay of Pigs Board of Directors who inaugurated the Bay of Pigs Museum and Library consisted of the following members: Miguel M. Alvarez y Gimeno (President), Luis Arrizurieta (Vice President), Antonio Zaora (Secretary), Raul Vallejo (Vice Secretary), Javier Souto (Organization Secretary), Guillermo Toledo Nieble (Vice Organization Secretary), Fulgencio Castro (Social Assistant), Luis Lamar (Treasurer), Feliciano Foyo (Vice Treasurer), Julio Gonzalez Rebull (Press & Propaganda), Agustin Navarro (Vice Press & Propaganda)

In 2015, Frank de Varona, a veteran and author, attempted to nominate the building for historic registration, only to withdraw the nomination due to opposition from other veterans.

== Collections ==
According to Time Out Miami, the museum has "a small but interesting collection of ephemera and memorabilia" about the Bay of Pigs Invasion, including the Brigade 2506 flag held by Democratic president John F. Kennedy in his 1962 address.

== Political visits ==
The museum was visited by Republican presidential candidate Fred Thompson in December 2007. In October 2016, Republican presidential candidate Donald Trump visited the museum. The museum was also visited by Republican gubernatorial candidate Ron DeSantis in September 2018. As governor, DeSantis again visited the museum on February 8, 2021, to introduce the COVID-19 vaccination program for veterans.

== See also ==
- Bay of Pigs Monument
