= Máximo Gómez Park =

Park in Miami, Florida

Máximo Gómez
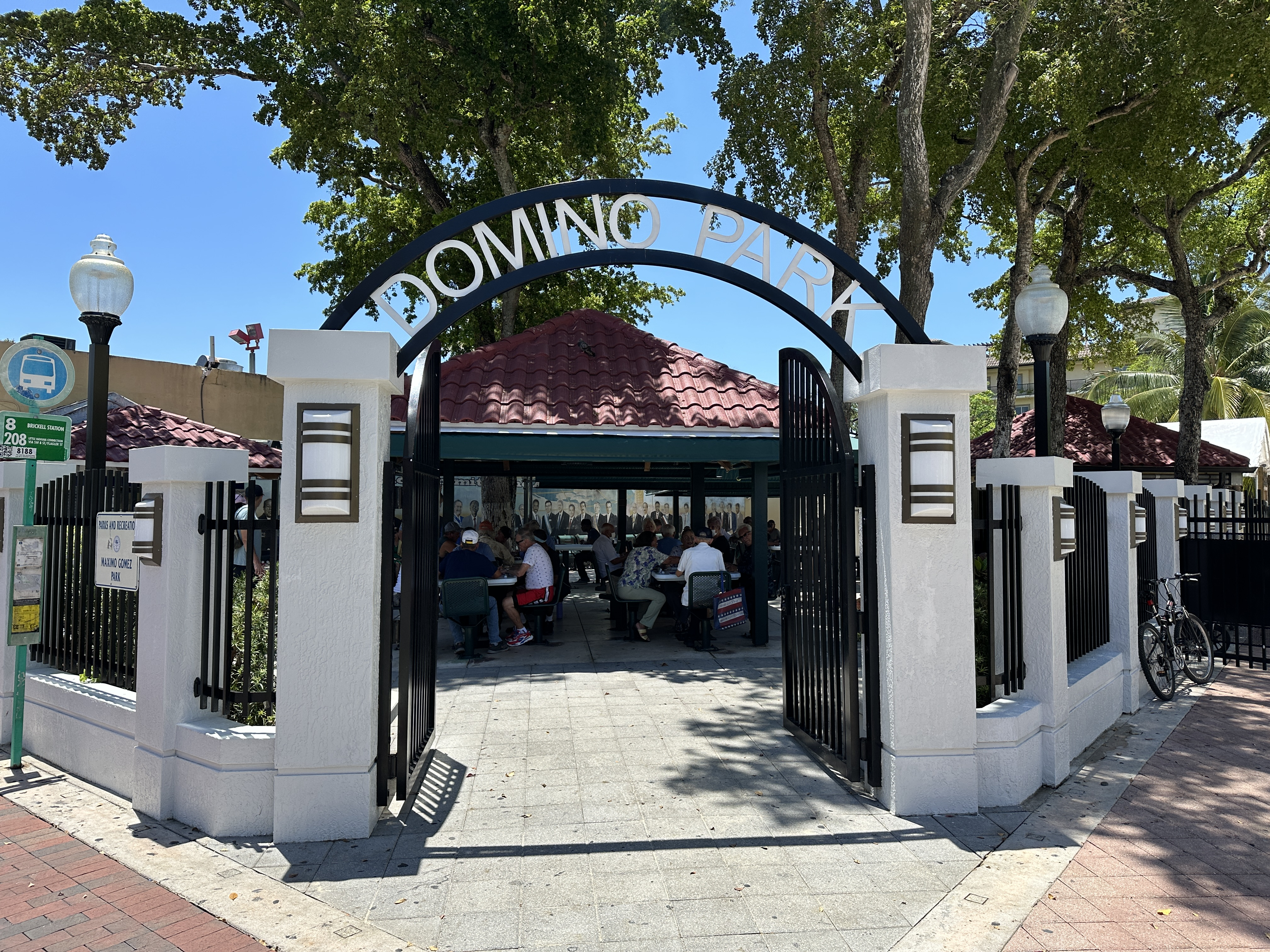
- Domino Park in Little Havana, Miami, in 2024
- Interactive map of Máximo Gómez

Maximo Gomez Park is a small park located on the historic Calle Ocho (8th Street) in Little Havana, Miami, Florida. The park is named after a hero of Cuba's War of Independence, Máximo Gómez. It is also nicknamed "Domino Park" and is a gathering place for Cuban immigrants.

Since the early 1970s, Máximo Gómez Park has been an place for Cuban immigrants to gather, drink coffee, smoke cigars, and play dominos. The park has also become a tourist destination, where non-Cubans can engage with immigrants. The small green space plays host to not only to domino players but also to food tours, art festivals and other cultural events in Little Havana.

== See also ==
- Cuba–United States relations
- Cuban Americans
- Ethnic enclave
- Little Havana
