= Brigade 2506 =

Group of Cuban exiles who attempted to invade Cuba

- Active: May 1960 – December 1962
- Country: Cuba
- Allegiance: United States; Cuban DRF
- Branch: CIA
- Type: State-sponsored paramilitary organization
- Role: Guerrilla warfare
- Size: 1,511
- Garrison/HQ: JMTrax, Guatemala
- Engagements: Cold War; Bay of Pigs Invasion

Insignia
- Brigade flag

Brigade 2506 (Brigada Asalto 2506) was a CIA-sponsored group of Cuban exiles formed in 1960 to attempt the military overthrow of the Cuban government headed by Fidel Castro. It carried out the abortive Bay of Pigs Invasion landings in Cuba on 17 April 1961.

== History ==
In November 1960, with Gregorio Aguilar Matteo spearheading training with 430 men, the leaders were chosen and the group was named Brigade 2506, using the membership number of Carlos (Carlyle) Rafael Santana Estevez, who had died in a training accident in September 1960; it was also known as the Blindado Battalion among members. The principal commanders were appointed as follows:

- Manuel Francisco Artime Buesa: Political leader
- José Alfredo Pérez San Román "Pepe": Military commander
- Erneido Andrés Oliva González: Military second-in-command
- Manuel Villafaña Martínez: Commander of the air force
- Ramón J. Ferrer Mena: Chief of staff
- Enrique Ruíz-Williams, 2nd in Command of the Heavy Weapons Battalion
- Higinio "Nino" Díaz, Commander of the "Special Battalion" and "Operation Mars"
- Francisco Pérez Castro "Brillo": Infantry battalion
- Alejandro del Valle Martí: 1st Paratroop Battalion
- Hugo Sueiro Ríos: 2nd Infantry Battalion
- Noelio Montero Díaz: 3rd Battalion
- Valentín Bacallao Ponte "Pipo": 4th Armoured Battalion
- Ricardo Montero Duque: 5th Infantry Battalion
- Francisco Montiel Maciera Rivera: 6th Infantry Battalion
- Roberto Pérez San Román: Heavy Gun Battalion

About 1,334 men traveled on a seaborne force from Guatemala, of which about 1,297 actually landed in Cuba, plus an additional 177 airborne paratroops. An estimated 114 drowned or were killed in action, and 1,183 were captured, tried and imprisoned. Private sympathizers in the United States eventually negotiated to give $53 million worth of food and medicine in exchange for release and repatriation of Brigade prisoners to Miami starting on 23 December 1962. On 29 December 1962, President John F. Kennedy hosted a 'welcome back' ceremony for captured Brigade 2506 veterans at the Orange Bowl in Miami. Some of its members have gone on to found the Brigade 2506 Veterans' Association, which own the Bay of Pigs Museum & Library in Miami.

== See also ==
- Cuban dissident movement
- James B. Donovan
- Escambray rebellion
