= Erneido Oliva =

Cuban-American military officer (1932–2020)

- Born: Erneido Andres Oliva Gonzalez; June 20, 1932; Aguacate, Havana Province, Cuba
- Died: January 30, 2020 (aged 87); Baltimore, Maryland, U.S.
- Military career
- Allegiance: United States of America
- Branch: United States Army; District of Columbia National Guard; Cuban Constitutional Army; Cuban Revolutionary Army; CIA: Brigade 2506
- Service years: 1951–1993
- Rank: Major General (DCNG) (1992); Brigadier General of the Line (USA) (1984); MP Brigade Commanding Officer (1982)
- Units: District of Columbia Army National Guard (Deputy Commanding General); 82nd Airborne Division; Assault Brigade 2506 –Bay of Pigs Invasion (Second in Command)
- Conflicts: Bay of Pigs Invasion; Dominican Republic Intervention
- Awards: Legion Of Merit Medal (1OL); Army Meritorious Service Medal (4OL); Army Commendation Medal (1OL); Army Achievement Medal (1OL); Army National Guard Achievement Medal (4OL); National Defense Service Medal; Armed Forces Expeditionary Medal; Humanitarian Service Medal; Armed Forces Reserve Medal; DCNG Distinguished Service Medal (1OL); Combat Infantry Badge; Senior Parachute Badge

Erneido Andres Oliva Gonzalez (June 20, 1932 – January 30, 2020) was a Cuban-American who was the second-in-command of Brigade 2506 land forces in the abortive Bay of Pigs Invasion of Cuba in April 1961.

== Biography ==
In 1954 Oliva was commissioned as a second lieutenant in the Cuban National Army after graduating from the Cuban Military Academy, "the Cadet School." After graduating with honors from the Artillery Academy in 1955 he was appointed professor of Artillery in the Cadet School until 1958. From 1958 to 1959 he was a student, also graduating with honors, and an instructor at the U.S. Army Caribbean School in the Canal Zone, Panama. In late 1959 after the Castro revolution overthrew General Batista, the Cuban army was "purged", but Oliva was appointed General Inspector at the INRA. In May 1960 he was one of a group of former Cuban officers planning a campaign against the Castro regime. They were all graduates of Cuba's military academy. He left the army early in August 1960 and flew to Miami. On August 29, 1960, Oliva and about 40 young Cuban exiles, recruited by the Central Intelligence Agency were transported via CIA C-54 aircraft to San José, Guatemala to perform guerrilla training that later became conventional.

Oliva was appointed second-in-command of Brigade 2506, the assault brigade of Cuban exiles, that landed at the Bay of Pigs on April 17, 1961, under the command of Jose (Pepe) San Roman. San Roman landed at Playa Giron and Oliva, commanding a brigade task force, established a beachhead at Playa Larga about 20 miles east of Giron. After the Brigade had ceased fighting on April 19, 1961, due to lack of air support promised by the Kennedy administration, Oliva organized all the Brigade's men that were withdrawing to Playa Giron and, with men of the 2nd and 6th battalions, tried to reach the Escambray mountains. However, Castro's air attacks forced the Brigadistas to scatter into the woods and swamps near Girón. He was captured by Cuban militia on April 23, 1961, and sentenced to 30 years in prison during a mass treason trial. Oliva was released from prison and flown to Miami on December 24, 1962, after the U.S. Government paid a ransom of $500,000 for each of the three leaders of the Brigade.

On December 29, 1962, Oliva was on stage next to the US president, John F. Kennedy, at the Orange Bowl in Miami, during the 'welcome back' ceremony for ransomed Brigade 2506 veterans and he addressed the veterans. On behalf of the members of the Brigade, 1,500 of whom were in formation at the stadium, he presented the Brigade flag to the President who said: "Commander I assure you that this flag will be returned to this Brigade in a free Havana." Since his arrival in the United States, Oliva developed a close relationship with U.S. attorney general Robert F. Kennedy. Bobby Kennedy involved him in the Cuban Project (Operation Mongoose), a White House-organized counterrevolutionary unit led by Manuel Artime based in Costa Rica and Nicaragua that staged commando raids on Cuban shore installations. In March 1963 Oliva was commissioned in the US Army as a second lieutenant and was appointed by President Kennedy to represent Cuban-American personnel serving throughout the US armed forces. In 1965, he was promoted to Captain at the Pentagon by Cyrus Vance, then Secretary of Defense. The Special Army Training for the officers of Brigade 2506 was terminated by President Johnson two months after the assassination of President Kennedy. At the White House in February 1964, in the presence of the then attorney general, Robert Kennedy, President Johnson informed Oliva of his decision to end all Cuban anti-Castro projects sponsored by the government including the one led by Oliva in the U.S. Army.

Oliva underwent infantry training at Fort Benning, Georgia, and artillery training at Fort Sill, Oklahoma. He participated in the U.S. intervention of the Dominican Republic where he served over a year. In 1969, he requested to be transferred to the US Army Reserve. In 1970, he joined the District of Columbia National Guard as a major. In August 1984, Oliva was promoted to brigadier general of the line in the US Army Reserve and commanded a Military Police Brigade. He earned a master's degree in international affairs from the American University, Washington, DC and attended the Program for Senior Executives in National and International Security at Harvard University. In July 1987, US president Ronald Reagan, appointed him to the position of deputy commanding general of the D.C. Army National Guard. In December 1992, he was promoted to major general in the District of Columbia Army National Guard. After his retirement on January 1, 1993, Oliva remained active in the anti-Castro effort, though largely steering clear of exile politics. In 1996, he founded the private Cuban-American Military Council (CAMCO), to promote cooperation between all Cuban military veterans, whether members of the Brigade 2506, the US Army or the Cuban army under Batista or Castro. Oliva was a member of all four. In January 2008, he was honored with the Heritage Award, a nationally recognized award of Heroes and Heritage which was presented to him by the vice-chairman of the Joint Chiefs of Staff. He was later appointed by President George W. Bush to serve as a member of the board of governors of the United States Organizations, Incorporated (USO) for a three-year term. Oliva lived with his wife, Graciela Ana Portela Avila, in the Washington Metropolitan Area. They had a daughter and a son and two grandsons.

He died on January 30, 2020, aged 87, in Baltimore, Maryland.

== Awards and decorations ==
Combat Infantry Badge
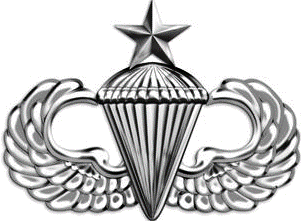
Senior Parachutist Badge
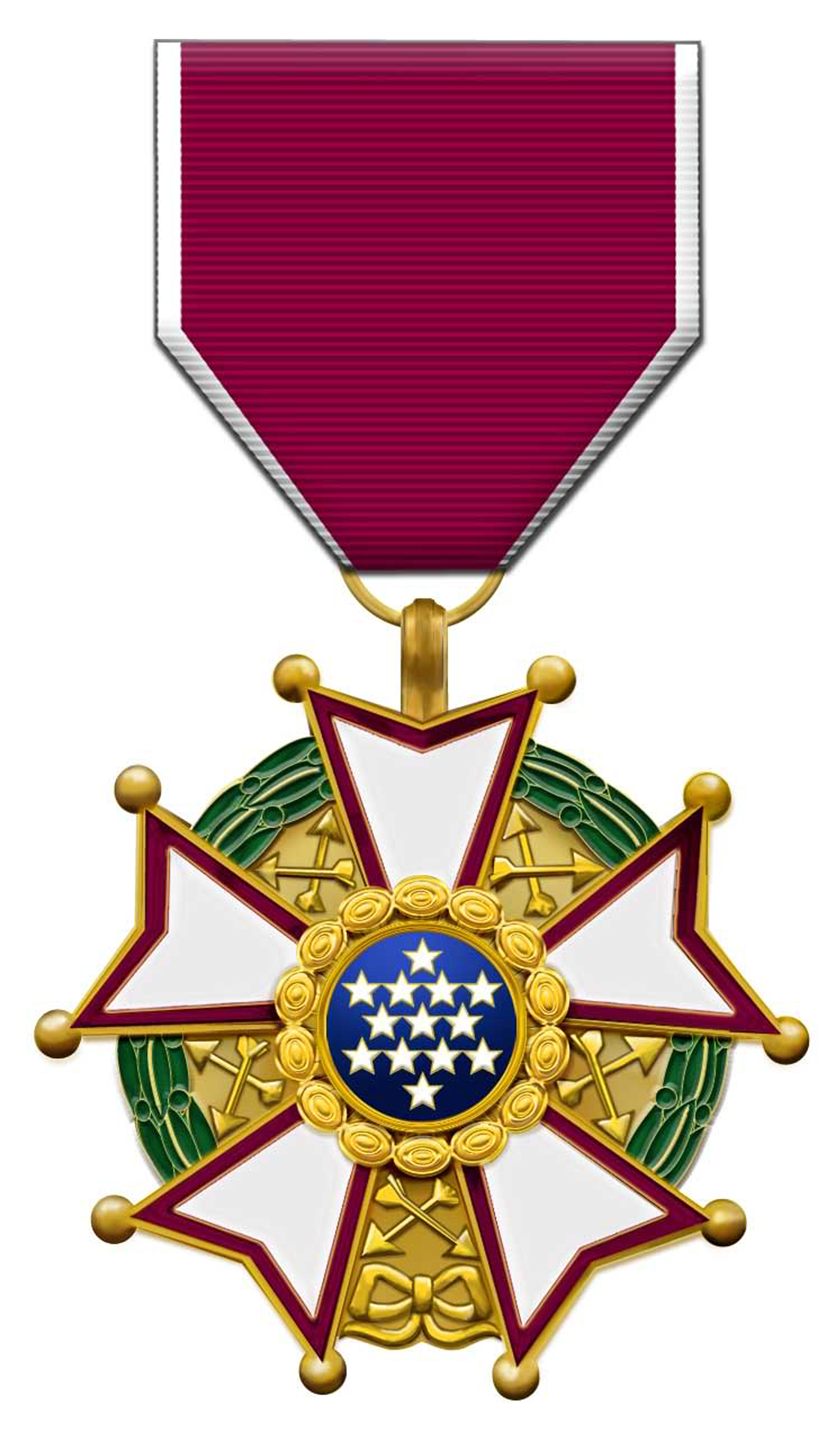
Legion of Merit, Legionnaire Degree (with one oak leaf cluster)
Meritorious Service Medal (with four oak leaf clusters)
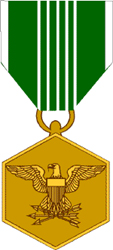
Commendation Medal (with one oak leaf cluster)
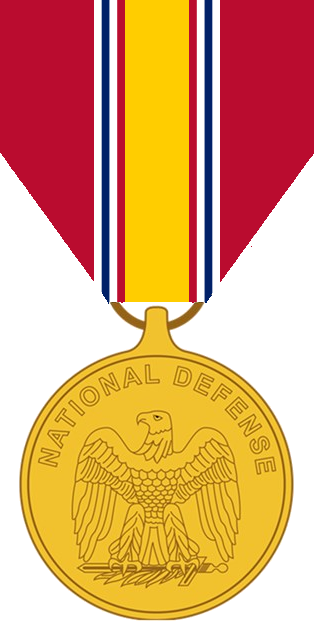
National Defense Service Medal (with one oak leaf cluster)
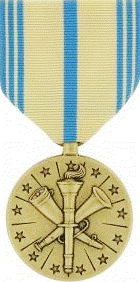
Armed Forces Reserve Medal

Army Reserve Good Conduct Medal (with four oak leaf clusters)
Armed Forces Expeditionary Medal
Humanitarian Service Medal
Army Service Ribbon
Army Overseas Service Ribbon
Army Reserve Components Overseas Service Ribbon
District of Columbia Distinguished Service Medal (with one oak leaf cluster)
District of Columbia Meritorious Service Medal
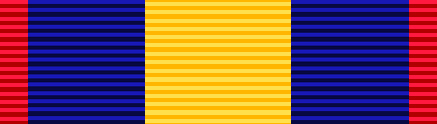
District of Columbia Long and Faithful Service Medal (with silver oak leaf cluster)
District of Columbia Emergency Service Ribbon
District of Columbia Community Service Ribbon (with silver oak leaf cluster)
District of Columbia Active Duty Ribbon
District of Columbia Attendance Ribbon (with one oak leaf cluster)
Army Presidential Unit Citation
Army Meritorious Unit Commendation
District of Columbia Commanding General's Outstanding Unit Award

== Sources ==
- Johnson, Haynes. 1964. The Bay of Pigs: The Leaders' Story of Brigade 2506. W.W. Norton & Co Inc. New York. ISBN 0-393-04263-4
- Lynch, Grayston L. 1998. Decision for Disaster: Betrayal at the Bay of Pigs. Bassey's. Washington. ISBN 1-57488-237-6
- Rodriguez, Juan Carlos. 1999. Bay of Pigs and the CIA. Ocean Press Melbourne. ISBN 1-875284-98-2
- Wyden, Peter. 1979. Bay of Pigs – The Untold Story. Simon and Schuster. New York. ISBN 0-671-24006-4 ISBN 0224017543 ISBN 978-0-671-24006-6
