= Ricardo Montero Duque =

Cuban exile (born 1925)

Ricardo Miguel Montero Duque (born July 4, 1925) is a Cuban exile who was a military battalion commander in the invading forces of Brigade 2506 during the Bay of Pigs Invasion of Cuba in April 1961.

== Biography ==
Montero Duque was born in Matanzas, Cuba. In 1950, he graduated from the Military Academy of the Cuban Army with the rank of Second Lieutenant, eventually assuming the rank of Major. His military career can be traced to battles against the guerrilla forces of Fidel Castro. In 1956, Major Duque was instrumental in leading the Cuban Army during the regime of Fulgencio Batista against Castro and his rebel forces in the mountains and forests of the Sierra Maestra in Oriente Province. After the Cuban Revolution of January 1, 1959, Duque was wanted by the revolutionary courts, accused of having committed human rights abuses against the civilian population during his service in Oriente. He fled Cuba, assisted by Pepe San Román.

During the Bay of Pigs invasion in 1961, he commanded the Infantry Battalion No.5 of Brigade 2506. He was one of 1,189 members of Brigade 2506 captured by Cuban government forces. Duque was sentenced to 30 years in prison for murders committed before Castro's takeover. The Cuban government agreed to release all but nine of them a year later, when the United States ransomed the prisoners for $53 million in food and medicine. Eight men remained, and later, the Cuban government released six more. One died and the second-to-last, Montero Duque (having spent 25 years in a Havana prison), was finally released in 1986. The last prisoner, Ramon Conte Hernandez, was released later that year.

On June 8, 1986, Duque was released from prison in Cuba and reunited with his family in Miami, Florida and later Union City, New Jersey. He has served as Director and Editor of the newspapers El Cuba Libre and La Semana. He has twice been elected to serve as President of the Union of Former Cuban Political Prisoners.

Duque has been a real estate agent since 1987. He was married to Esther, his wife of fifty years, who died in 2007.

== Bibliography ==
- Johnson, Haynes. 1964. The Bay of Pigs: The Leaders' Story of Brigade 2506. W.W. Norton & Co Inc. New York. ISBN 0-393-04263-4
- Lynch, Grayston L. 1998. Decision for Disaster: Betrayal at the Bay of Pigs. Brassey's . Washington ISBN 1-57488-237-6
