= Bay of Pigs Monument =

Monument in Miami, Florida, USA

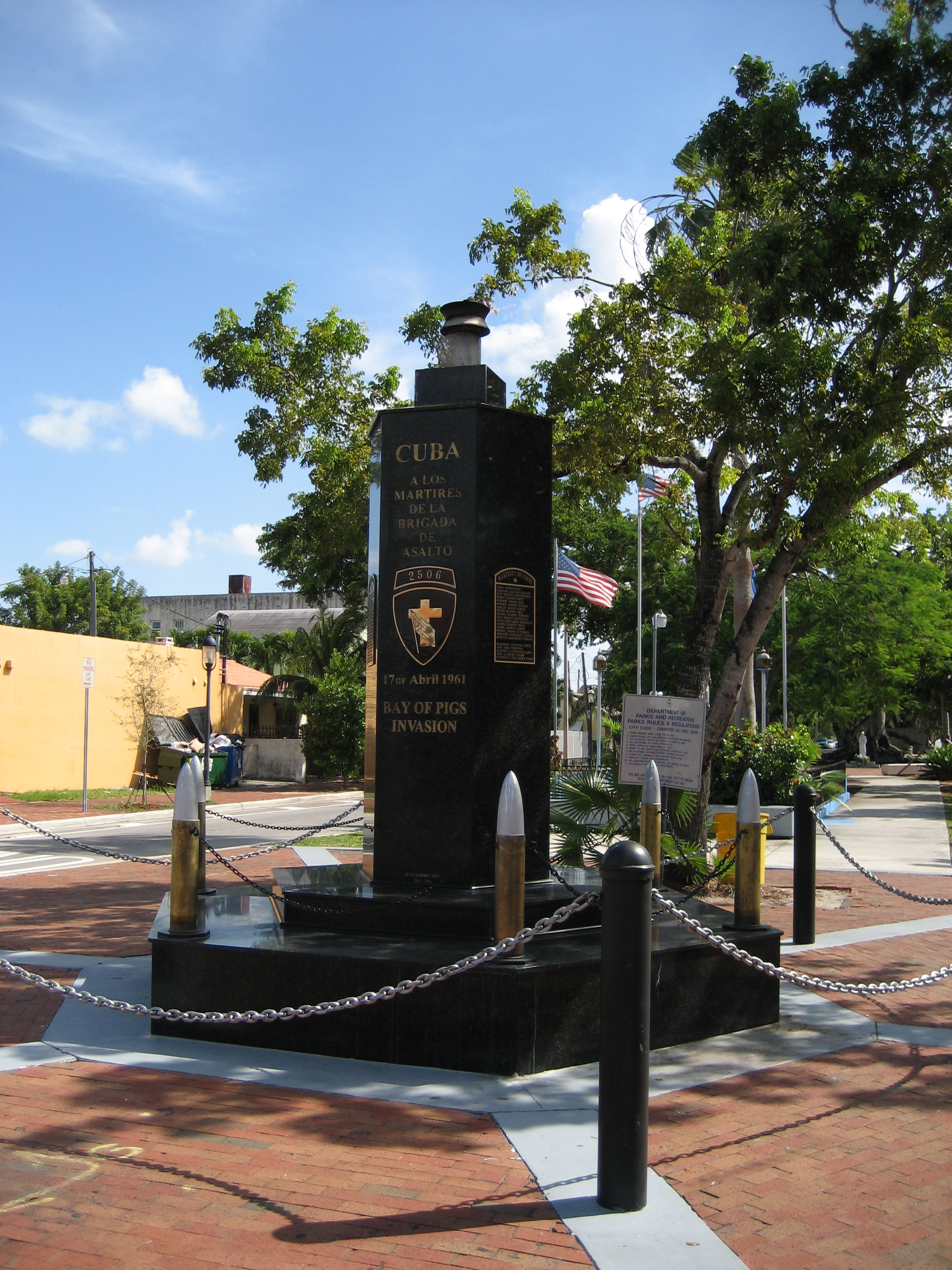

- Completion date: 1971
- Location: Miami, Florida
- 25°45′56.3″N 80°12′59.3″W

The Bay of Pigs Monument is a monument in honor of the fallen of the Bay of Pigs Invasion in Little Havana, Miami, Florida. Their names are engraved on the monument, and there is an eternal flame at the top. The monument was dedicated on April 17, 1971, by "several hundred Cuban exiles" as well as Miami Mayor David T. Kennedy and then-Senator Lawton Chiles. President Richard Nixon "cabled his best wishes" for the occasion.

== See also ==
- Bay of Pigs Museum
- Bay of Pigs Invasion
