= Rolando Escalona =

American politician

- Escalona in 2025

Member of the Miami City Commission from District 3
- Incumbent
- Assumed office 17 December 2025
- Preceded by: Joe Carollo

Personal details
- Born: Havana, Cuba
- Citizenship: American
- Party: Republican
- Education: Miami Dade College; Florida International University (Political Science and International Relations)
- Occupation: Politician, restaurant manager, real estate broker

Rolando Escalona is an American politician and member of the Republican Party serving as a member of the Miami City Commission representing District 3 since 17 December 2025. He won a runoff election on 9 December 2025 against former commissioner Frank Carollo, ending the long-standing Carollo family representation of the district. Although Miami City Commission elections are officially nonpartisan, Escalona is a registered Republican.

== Early life and education ==
Escalona was born in Havana, Cuba. He immigrated to the United States and settled in Miami about 11 years before his election (around 2014). He arrived speaking little English and began working in the restaurant industry, starting as a busser.

He attended Miami Dade College and later earned degrees in political science and international relations from Florida International University. He also obtained a real estate license.

== Career ==
Escalona worked his way up in Miami's restaurant industry, eventually becoming general manager of Sexy Fish, a high-profile restaurant in Brickell, where he managed a staff of approximately 150 people.

In 2025 he ran as a political newcomer for the open District 3 seat on the Miami City Commission (covering Little Havana, East Shenandoah, West Brickell, Silver Bluff, The Roads and surrounding areas). He placed second in the general election and then defeated Frank Carollo in the December 9 runoff with 53.1% of the vote.

He assumed office on 17 December 2025. His campaign and early tenure focused on accountability, neighborhood services, affordability, small business support, and improved city permitting.

== Personal life ==
Escalona became a father of twins during his 2025 campaign.

== Early life and education ==
Escalona was born in Havana, Cuba. He immigrated to the United States and settled in Miami about 11 years before his election (around 2014). He arrived speaking little English and began working in the restaurant industry, starting as a busser.

He attended Miami Dade College and later earned degrees in political science and international relations from Florida International University. He also obtained a real estate license.

== Career ==
Escalona worked his way up in Miami's restaurant industry, eventually becoming general manager of Sexy Fish, a high-profile restaurant in Brickell, where he managed a staff of approximately 150 people.

In 2025 he ran as a political newcomer for the open District 3 seat on the Miami City Commission (covering Little Havana, East Shenandoah, West Brickell, Silver Bluff, The Roads and surrounding areas). He placed second in the general election and then defeated Frank Carollo in the December 9 runoff with 53.1% of the vote.

He assumed office on 17 December 2025. His campaign and early tenure focused on accountability, neighborhood services, affordability, small business support, and improved city permitting.

== Personal life ==
Escalona became a father of twins during his 2025 campaign.
