= Pepe San Román =

Cuban soldier (1930–1989)

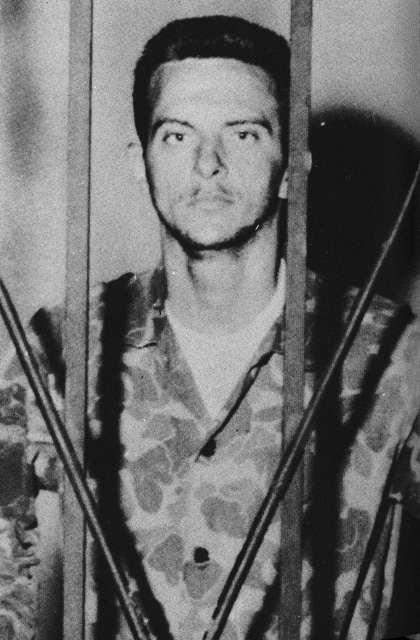
- Born: 1930
- Died: 10 September 1989 (age 58–59); Miami, Florida, U.S.
- Cause of death: Suicide
- Children: 4
- Military career
- Allegiance: Republic of Cuba (1949–1959); United States (1960–1962)
- Branch: Cuban Constitutional Army; CIA
- Service years: 1949–1962
- Unit: Brigade 2506
- Conflicts: Cuban Revolution; Bay of Pigs Invasion

José Alfredo Pérez San Román (1930 – 10 September 1989), better known as Pepe San Román, was a Cuban military officer and the commander of Brigade 2506 ground troops in the Bay of Pigs Invasion of Cuba in April 1961.

== Biography ==
He enlisted in the Cuban Constitutional Army in 1949 after graduation from high school, when financial problems forced him to give up studying architecture at the University of Havana. In 1950, he was accepted as a cadet at the Military Academy, and, three years later, graduated with honors and was promoted to second lieutenant in the infantry. Soon afterwards, he left for the United States, in a program of US assistance to the Cuban Armed Forces. In the United States, he took a combat engineering course for field officers. He spent some time at Fort Belvoir, Virginia. During the next four years, from 1954 to 1958, San Román was an instructor in the combat engineering corps. In 1956, he was promoted to first lieutenant, second in command of a company. He went to the US Army Infantry Center at Fort Benning, Georgia, where he graduated from the infantry course for field officers. In 1957, in Cuba, an incipient guerrilla army was challenging the regular troops. For several months, San Román commanded a company in the zone of operations. There, he felt an aversion toward those military officers who carried out abuses and excesses against the civilian population.

In 1958, he was appointed a professor at the Military Academy. That same year, he was promoted to captain and named G-3 of the Infantry Division, a post equivalent to lieutenant colonel. He was arrested in December 1958, accused of conspiring against the powers of the state. He had been involved in an assassination attempt against Fulgencio Batista. Because of that and his clean service record, San Román was later released and regained his rank after the Cuban Revolution. He formed part of the commission that was created to cleanse the Armed Forces, but was arrested and accused in Case 39/59 in April 1959. San Román had helped former Commander Ricardo Montero Duque to leave the country. Montero Duque was wanted by the revolutionary courts, accused of having committed abuses against the civilian population during his service in Oriente. In November 1959, Pérez San Román left for the United States.

In May 1960 he was one of a group of ten former Cuban officers in Miami, Florida, who were planning a campaign against the Castro regime. They were graduates of Cuba's military academy, the Cadet School. On 2 June 1960, San Román and nine fellow 'recruits', including his brother Roberto San Román, were transported by CIA agents to Useppa island off Fort Myers, Florida, for physical and psychological assessments. On 22 June 1960 San Román and 27 others were taken by land and air to Fort Gulick in Panama for paramilitary training. On 22 August 1960 he flew via CIA C-54 aircraft to San José, Guatemala. At the CIA-run infantry training base known as 'Trax Base' in the mountains near Retalhuleu, Pepe San Román was in charge of weapons and demolition training. Around November 1960, he was appointed Brigade 2506 commander with about 430 recruits in training.

During the Bay of Pigs invasion Román radioed for back-up, although no help arrived.

Do you people realize how desperate the situation is? Do you back us up or quit? All we want is low jet cover… I need it badly or cannot survive. Please don’t desert us.

After the brigade had ceased fighting on 19 April 1961, the third day of the Bay of Pigs Invasion, San Román and his men scattered into the woods and swamps. He was captured by Cuban militia on 25 April 1961. Román was sentenced to 30 years in prison in a mass trial for treason, along with everyone else who was captured. He was released from prison and flown to Miami on 24 December 1962. On 29 December 1962, Pepe San Román was on stage next to the 35th US president, John F. Kennedy, at the Orange Bowl in Miami during the homecoming ceremony for captured Brigade 2506 veterans. The other leaders of the Brigade also on stage at the occasion were José Miró Cardona and Manuel Artime. Román felt betrayed by the U.S. and was extremely bitter, he stated that "I hated the United States and I felt I had been betrayed. Every day it became worse. Then I was getting madder and madder and I wanted to get a rifle and come and fight against the U.S."

Pepe Perez San Román committed suicide by taking an overdose in Miami, Florida, on 10 September 1989. He was survived by two sons, Alfredo and Robert; two daughters, Marisela and Sandra; a brother, Roberto Pérez San Roman, a sister, Laly de la Cruz, and five grandchildren.
