= Robert Wesley Mason =

American actor and singer

Robert Wesley "Wes" Mason (born in Norfolk, Virginia) is an American actor and singer known for originating the baritone role of Reinaldo Arenas (as Wes Mason) in the world premiere of Jorge Martín's opera adaptation of Before Night Falls.
