= Dolores M. Koch =

Cuban-American literary critic and translator (1928–2009)

Dolores Mercedes Koch (née Gonzalez; 1928 – 11 June 2009) was a Cuban American literary critic and translator who was a pioneer in the area of microfiction.

== Biography ==
Koch was born in Havana, Cuba in 1928.

Koch completed her higher education at the Graduate Center of the City University of New York. She received her PhD in Latin American Literature in 1986, and in addition to her work on microfiction, translated to English several important Spanish-language works, including those of Laura Restrepo, Jorge Bucay, Alina Fernández, Emily Schindler, Enrique Joven, and her compatriot Reinaldo Arenas, whose work Before Night Falls was adapted to a film of the same name.

Her article (in Spanish) "El micro-relato en México: Torri, Arreola, Monterroso y Avilés Fabila", published in 1981, is the first critical work on microfiction in the Spanish-speaking world.

Koch died at her home in New York on 11 June 2009.
