= Sexología y Sociedad =

Sexología y Sociedad (English: Sexology and Society) is a medical journal published in Cuba. The journal was first published in 1994, and is currently published by the Cuban National Center for Sex Education. The journal is published in both English and Spanish languages. The editor is Mariela Castro.
