= Johannes Pache =

German composer and organist

Johannes Johann Fürchtegott Pache (9 December 1857, Bischofswerda – 24 December 1897, Limbach) was a German composer and organist.

== Life ==
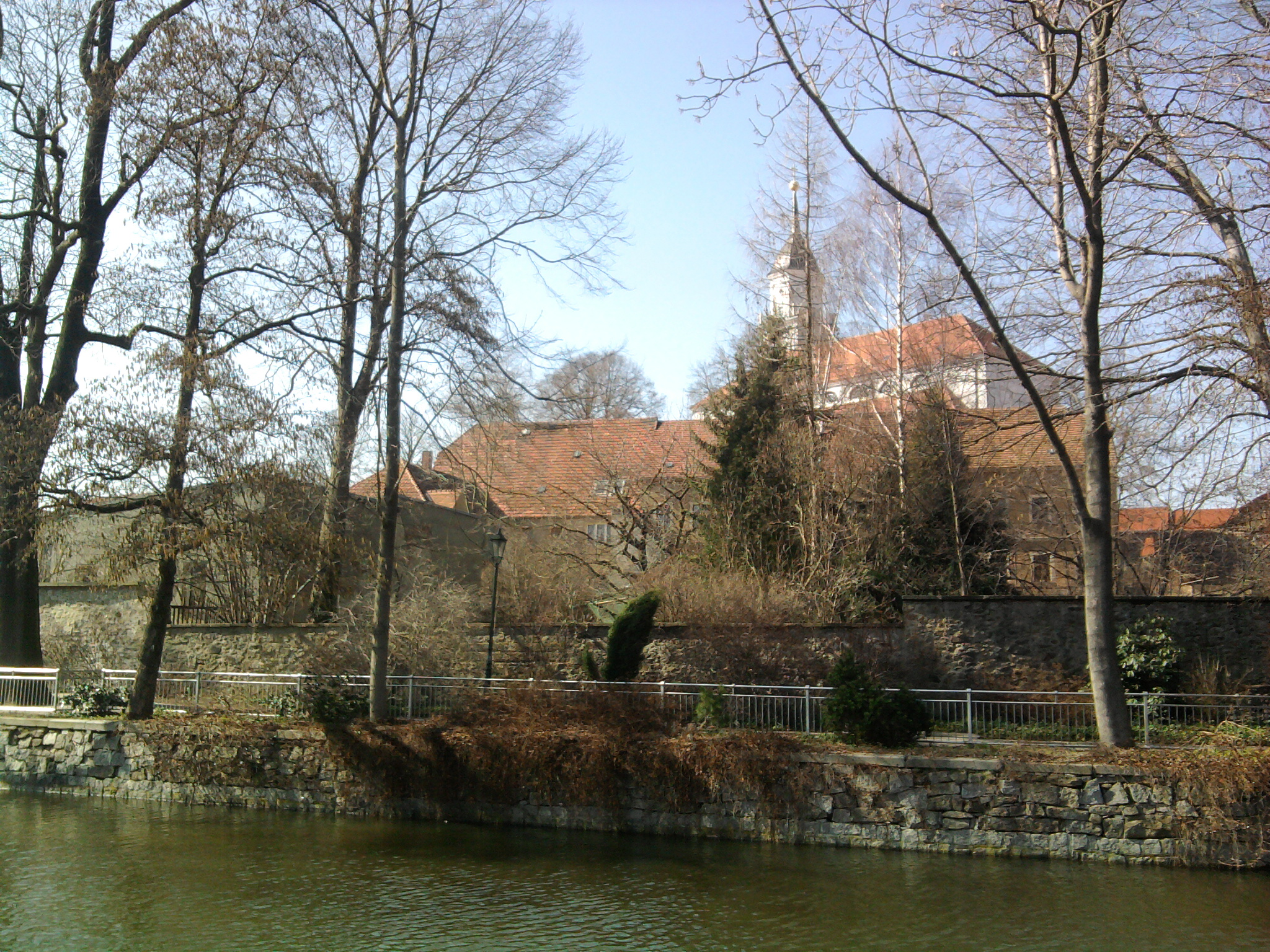
Pache's birthplace left in front of Christuskirche by Gottlob Friedrich Thormeyer.

Pache was born in Bischofswerda, Upper Lusatia, as son of a teacher. It was his father wish that Johannes should become a theologian as his two elder brothers did. Pache attended the school in Zittau, where his love to music awoke. He played piano, sang in a chorus and accomplished the first compositions. However, he neglected his school duties and stayed down. The father tried to convince him to become a teacher, all in vain. Pache resumed school in Bautzen, where he gave some music lectures and composed his first known pieces. Finally he convinced the father to let him study music in Dresden.

In 1879 Pache got in Herisau his first appointment as organist and music director. Two years later he returned to Dresden, where he earned his money with casual engagements. In 1884 he moved to Leipzig, where he became known as concert pianist and composer. In Naumburg he was appointed music director and founded a widely known chorus. In these years Pache achieved material prosperity, especially after music publishers in Leipzig engaged him as advisor.

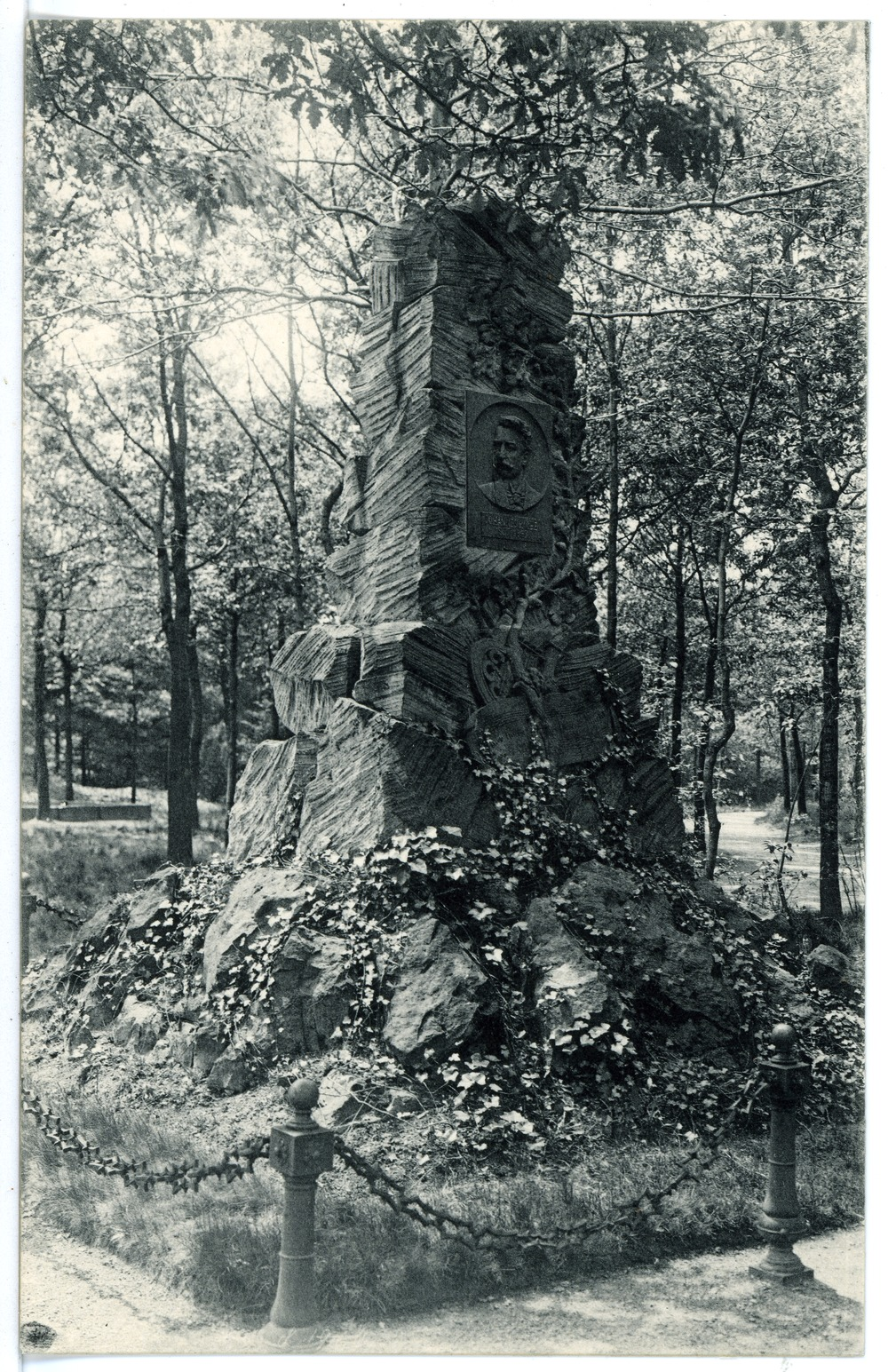
Pache Memorial in Limbach (1913)

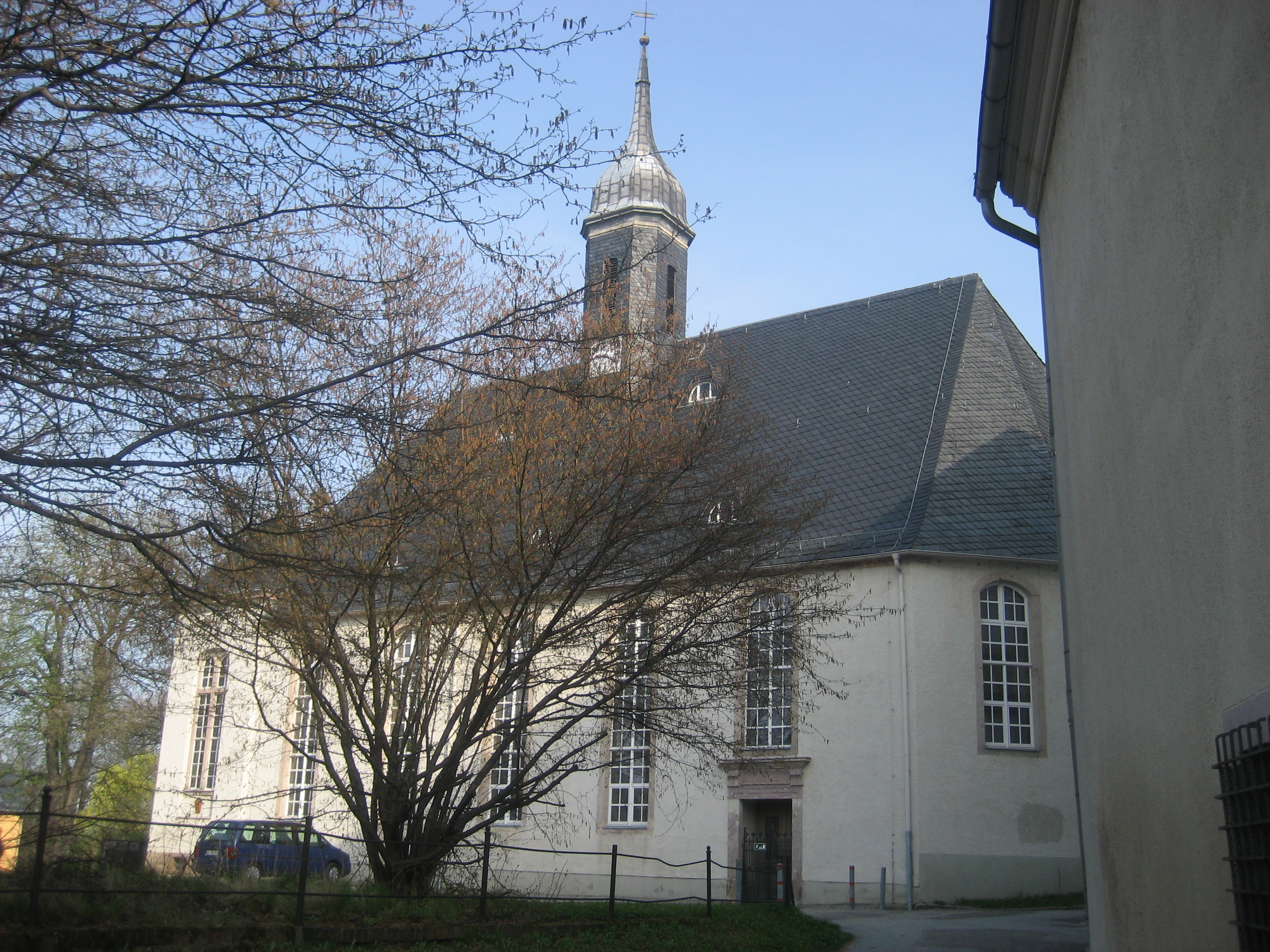
Limbach Municipal Church.

Pache moved to Limbach, where he was appointed cantor in 1889. During the few remaining years Pache gained high reputation. He founded a chorus, composed, and he is still today considered the originator of the widely known church music tradition there. In 1902, grateful citizens erected a monument in the town park.

== Work ==
Pache his best known for his chorus compositions, especially for men. Many of his works were sung nationwide at his time. Among them is Die Germanenschlacht (op. 106), which Pache dedicated to Hermann Kretzschmar and his chorus in Leipzig. Moreover, Pache's choruses were highly estimated as memories by the German immigrants in the United States.

Some instrumental pieces for violin and piano reached wide acknowledgment too. Still in 1936, Gamble Hinged Music Chicago published Pache in Graded masterworks for strings together with Edvard Grieg and Charles Gounod. Moreover, Pache treated selected master pieces. His opera Tobias Schwalbe was based on Der Nachtwächter by Theodor Körner.

== Literature ==
- International lexicons of musicians: American Guild of Organists, Novello, Ewer & co, 1906; The Musiclover's Handbook, New York, University Society, 1911 ff.; Alfred Remy & Theodore Baker: Baker's biographical dictionary of musicians, New York, G. Schirmer, 1919; Tobias Norlind: Allmant musiklexikon, Stockholm, Wahlstrom & Widstrand, 1927–28; Carlo Schmidl: Dizionario universale dei musicisti, Milan, Sonzogno, 1937; Paul Arma, Yvonne Tiénot: Nouveau dictionnaire de musique, Éditions ouvricres, 1947; Joaquin Pena: Diccionario de la musica labor, Barcelona, 1954; Laird, Ross, Brunswick-Balke: Brunswick Records: A Discography of Recordings 1916-1931, Collender Company, Brunswick Radio Corporation, 2001
- Hans Volkmann. Johannes Pache, ein Meister des deutschen Chorliedes. Unsere Heimat, Beilage zum Sächs. Erzähler. Nr. 49. 6 December 1937
- Frank Fiedler, Uwe Fiedler: Lebensbilder aus der Oberlausitz: 60 Biografien aus Bautzen, Bischofswerda und Umgebung. Books on Demand, 2017, ISBN 978-3-7448-7197-6, pp. 260–265 (Digitalisat in the Internet Archive)
