= Pentagonia =

The Pentagonia is the collective title of a series of five novels by Cuban author Reinaldo Arenas. It was subtitled by its author "the secret history of Cuba." The novels were written from the mid-1960s through the late 1980s, and indeed, as was recounted in Arenas's autobiography Before Night Falls, were rewritten many times as manuscripts were lost, destroyed, and/or confiscated by Cuban authorities. Each of the novels is semi-autobiographical and has Arenas as one, if not more than one, of the major characters.

== Book One ==
The first volume, Singing from the Well, was originally published as Celestino antes del alba in 1967, the only Arenas novel to be published in Cuba. The book recounts the history of a young child, Celestino, growing up in the province of Oriente, Cuba. Celestino was a child ostracized by his family because of his literary talents. He would write on trees and in retaliation his grandfather denuded the forest.

== Book Two ==
The second volume, Palace of the White Skunks, focuses on adolescent Fortunato who was raised in a house of frustrated aunts, a primal grandmother, and an emasculated grandfather. Set during the 1959 Cuban Revolution, the novel follows the main character as he clumsily joins the rebels. The acclaimed editor, Thomas Colchie, has written, that in this work, “Arenas has created a haunting family portrait, combining the lyrical empathy of a Tennessee Williams toward his characters’ troubled lives with a radically fractured narrative that pays dark tribute less to Faulkner than to the schizophrenia of life under any dictatorial extreme.” (Colchie 2001)

== Book Three ==
The Third volume, Farewell to the Sea, is a divided novel, telling the story of a married couple on a six-day vacation on the Cuban coast. The first half is a prosaic stream-of-consciousness narrative of the troubled wife demonstrating her love and inability to understand her husband, Hector. The last half of the novel is composed of six poetic cantos sung in silence to the sea by Hector, a poet who is no longer allowed to write and who has been compelled to enter into a sham marriage to avoid the charge of homosexuality. It is a story of a marriage of two people who, while sharing genuine affection, are so different and incompatible that they not only cannot communicate but also fail to speak in the same terms, one in prose and the other in poetry.

== Book Four ==
In the fourth volume, The Color of Summer, Arenas appears as three characters: Gabriel, the dutiful "straight" son; Reinaldo, the expatriate author; and Skunk in a Funk, the "picaro" – faggot – who seeks merely to live and work as an artist in Castro’s Cuba while engaging in anonymous sex. The novel is set in a carnival celebrating the 50th anniversary of the revolution and breaks many, if not all of the norms of narrative storytelling (the "Foreword" appears on page 252). In that foreword, Arenas states that the novel is a "grotesque and satirical (and therefore realistic) portrait of an aging tyranny and the tyrant himself..." He adds that the novel “is not a linear work, but circular, and therefore cyclonic, with a vortex or eye – the Carnival – towards which all vectors whirl."

== Book Five ==
The fifth and final volume, The Assault, is a dark and Kafkaesque vision of a future Cuba, where homosexuality is punishable by death, told by a repressed homosexual turned government agent for the "Bureau of Counterwhispering" as he searches to destroy all whispers, homosexuals, dissidents and most particularly his own mother.

== Overview ==
Writing about the entire Pentagonia, Arenas wrote, in the foreword to The Color of Summer:

In all of these novels, the central character is an author, a witness, who dies but in the next novel is reborn under a different name yet with the same angry rebellious goal: to chant or recount the horror and the life of the people, including his own. There thus remains, in the midst of a terrible, tempestuous time, a life raft, a ship of hope, the intransigence of man the creator, the poet, the rebel –standing firm before all those repressive principles which, if they could, would destroy him utterly – one of those principals being the horror that he himself exudes.
