= Monika Krause-Fuchs =

German university teacher (1941–2019)

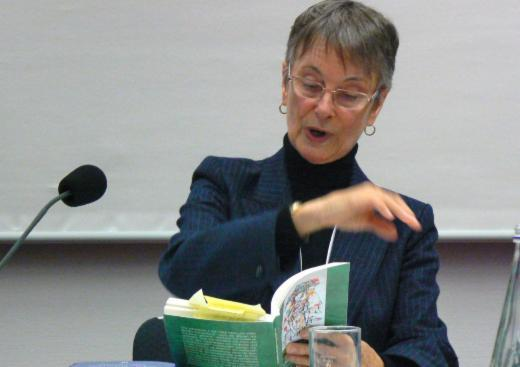
- Born: Monika Krause; 8 April 1941; Schwaan, Germany
- Died: 20 May 2019 (aged 78); Flensburg, Germany
- Other name: Queen of Condoms
- Education: University of Rostock; University of Havana
- Occupations: Teacher, sociologist, sex educator
- Children: 2
- Website: https://queen-of-condoms.com/the-author

Monika Krause-Fuchs (Monika Krause in Cuba; April 8, 1941 – May 20, 2019) was a German sociologist and sex educator who lived and worked in Cuba between 1962 and 1990. She was the first director of the Cuban National Center for Sex Education (CENESEX) and played a key role in the development and implementation of a modern, scientific and effective national program for sex education and family planning in Cuba.

== Biography ==
=== First years in Cuba ===
In 1961, as a young student at the University of Rostock, Monika Krause met her future husband Jesús Jiménez, a Spanish captain in the Cuban merchant marine who grew up in Cuba.

The authorities of the German Democratic Republic obstructed Monika Krause's plans to marry. At that time, Cuba was not yet considered "socialist"; she was threatened with the termination of her studies. Diplomatic intervention by the Cuban government, with which her fiancé had good links, made the marriage possible after all.

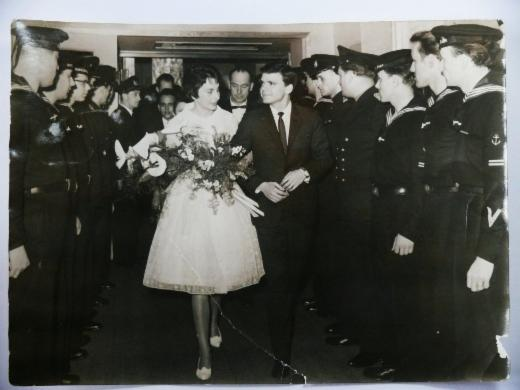
Monika Krause's wedding with the Spanish-Cuban naval captain Jesús Jiménez Escobar in 1962 in Rostock-Warnemünde, East Germany.

After arriving in Cuba, Monika worked mainly as an interpreter. She resumed her studies after being delayed twice due to the birth of her two children and foreign missions on her husband's side. In 1970 she graduated from the University of Havana with a Master of Arts (licenciatura) in Spanish Language and Literature.

After successfully completing her studies, she was employed at the headquarters (Dirección Nacional) of the Federation of Cuban Women (FMC), whose president was Vilma Espín, the wife of Raúl Castro. At FMC, Monika became a policy officer for international relations.

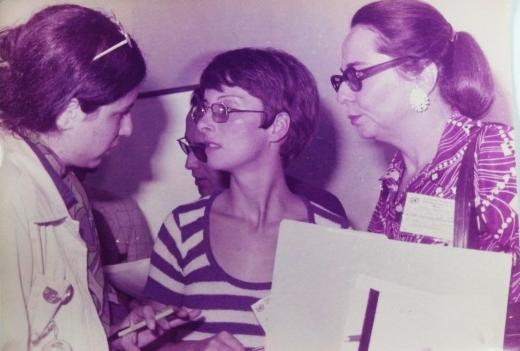
Monika and Vilma Espín, President of the Federation of Cuban Women, at UN World Conference on Women, Mexico City, 1975, International Year of Women.

=== Activity as a sex educator ===
In 1976, Monika Krause suffered a broken neck in a serious car accident. Thereupon, she was unable to take up regular work (often involving travel) for several months. She was then commissioned by the president of the Federation of Cuban Women, Vilma Espín, to review international literature that could be useful in developing a sex education program in Cuba. Among other fateful events of that year, she met Prof. Dr. Celestino Álvarez Lajonchere and Prof. Dr. Siegfried Schnabl. She would work with Dr. Lajonchere, an eminent Cuban gynecologist, in the coming years forming a highly effective team. Dr. Schnabl, a world-renowned sexologist, would provide inspiration with the successful sex education program he had developed in East Germany.

In 1977, the National Working Group for Sex Education (GNTES) was founded and Monika appointed its coordinator. GNTES was later upgraded in the National Center for Sex Education (CENESEX), of which Monika was the first director, a position she held until her return to Germany in November 1990.

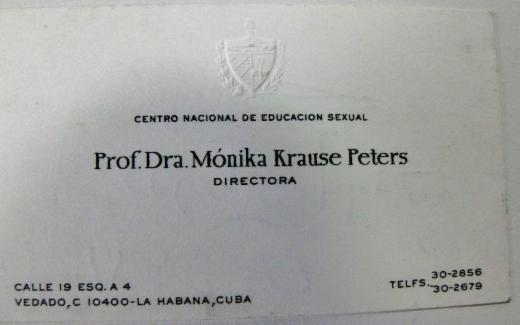
Business card from Prof. Dr. Monika Krause Peters (her full official name in Cuba) as the first director of the National Center for Sex Education CENESEX, 1989

In 1983, Monika Krause received her Ph.D. Summa Cum Laude in the field of Sex Education at the University of Rostock. After her habilitation in 1986, she became a professor at the School of Medical Sciences of Havana.

Monika Krause considered teenage pregnancy a serious problem of the Cuban society of the time. In her opinion, this was caused by the fatal combination of machismo, which establishes a reactionary gender/role model, and the boarding schools where almost all of the island's youth aged between 12 and 18 went to school, away from their parents. It is no wonder that she repeatedly would encounter resistance to her work from the Ministry of Education.

A key achievement of GNTES/CENESEX was the publication of numerous standard works on sexuality by renowned authors, both for health professionals and for the general public, in editions of hundreds of thousands of books that sold out immediately and had a profound social impact. Monika invested years of persistence in this endeavor. Books such as "Man and Woman, Intimate by Dr. Siegfried Schabl, which dealt with the subject of homosexuality comprehensively and with a modern approach, were made available to Cuban readers.

Monika carried out an extensive teaching and advocacy activities using the media, including her own TV and radio programs, becoming a public celebrity. On Cuban state television she showed a condom for the first time in the 1980s and explained how it worked, which earned her the nickname Queen of Condoms.

"Dr. Krause has not been daunted by Cuban male's abhorrence of contraceptive responsibility. She enthusiastically promotes condoms as the best all-around contraceptive device. After discussing the merits of prophylactics on television and press, she has been dubbed Cuba's "queen of condoms" by a bemused public.

— Lois M. Smith, "Progress, Science and Myth: The Health Education of Cuban Women", Cuban Studies Vol. 19. University of Pittsburgh Press (1989)

Monika was a strong advocate of women's rights and a staunch fighter against institutionalized homophobia. She increasingly used her prominence to openly criticize state-imposed discrimination and oppression of gays.

In the Cuban macho society, she earned hostilities. But she received even more recognition from the grassroots, especially for her coherent, humble stance on the thorny issue of sexuality. Monika Krause merited several nicknames, hostile and friendly: "Youth Corrupter", "Monica the Terrible", "Queen of Condoms", "Monica of Sex Education".

Monika was elected member in 1985 and 1990 of the National Committee of the Federation of Cuban Women. In 1989, she was elected member of the World Association for Sexual Health.

=== Return to Germany ===
Disillusioned with the Cuban Revolution and after a broken marriage, she and her two Cuban-born children finally returned to Germany in November 1990, under the pretext of a vacation trip to see her mother. Monika Krause married a second time Dr. Harry Fuchs and lived in Glücksburg on the Baltic Sea, and in the former West until her death. She wrote several books about her life and lifework in Cuba, gave lectures, and held workshops.

Monika Krause-Fuchs died in May 2019 at the age of 78.

== Filmography ==
- Silvana Ceschi and Reto Stamm: La reina del condón (Switzerland 2007), documentary about Monika Krause-Fuchs (Trailer)

== Books ==
- Daniel and Dictys Jimenez Krause (Eds.): Monika Krause, Queen of Condoms. Memoir of a Sex Educator in Revolutionary Cuba (2022). ISBN 978-05-7834-013-5. Iliada Ediciones, Miami and Berlin.
- Monika Krause-Fuchs: Monika y la Revolución. Una mirada singular sobre la historia reciente de Cuba (2002). ISBN 978-8479264024. Centro de la Cultura Popular Canaria. Spain.
- Monika Krause-Fuchs: Cuba: mi infierno y mi paraíso (2020). ISBN 979-8663119627. Ilíada Ediciones, Berlin.
- Monika Krause-Fuchs: ¿Machismo?, no gracias. Sexualidad en la revolución (2007). ISBN 978-84-8382-112-1. Ediciones Idea. Colección Letras de Cuba. Santa Cruz de Tenerife, Spain.
- Monika Krause-Fuchs: Cuba – Meine Hölle, mein Paradies. 30 Jahre Fidel Castro und ein Ende (2008). ISBN 978-3-86634-623-9. Projekte-Verlag-Cornelius GmbH, Halle/Saale, Germany.
- Monika Krause-Fuchs: Machismo ist noch lange nicht tot! Kuba: Sexualität im Umbruch (2008). ISBN 978-3-86634-469-3. Projekte-Verlag-Cornelius GmbH, Halle/Saale, Germany.

== Articles ==
- El embarazo en la adolescente. Editorial Científico-Técnica, La Habana, 1983.
- El problema del niño no deseado; Sexualidad e igualdad; Nosotros y el amor. Guiones para una serie de la televisión cubana (1985–1986).
- Planificación familiar en Cuba. Aspectos políticos y legales. Cuba Internacional, La Habana, 1986; Informationen, Academia de Ciencias Sociales, Berlin, 1988.
- Educación sexual. Selección de lecturas. Editorial Científico-Técnica, La Habana, 1988.
- Educación sexual en Cuba. Cuba Internacional. La Habana, 1987; Informationen, Academia de Ciencias Sociales, Berlin, 1987; Boletín del CORA, México D.F., 1989.
- Conocimientos y actitudes del médico de la familia sobre la sexualidad y la planificación familiar. Evaluación de una investigación. Informationen. Academia de Ciencias Sociales, Berlin, 1989.
- Interview: En sexo todo es normal. Revista Alma Mater No 325, 6/7 1990.
- Para mí una muchacha vírgen es como un coche nuevo. Marianne Braig, Karin Gabbert, Wolfgang Gabbert (Hrsg.). Geschlecht und Macht. Jahrbuch Lateinamerika Band 24. Münster, 2000.
- Die kubanische Sexualpolitik zwischen Anspruch und Wirklichkeit. Ottmar Ette, Martin Franzbach (Hrsg.), Kuba Heute. Politik, Wirtschaft, Kultur. Frankfurt am Main, 2001.
