= LGBTQ rights in Cuba =

- Cuba
- Legal status: Legal since 1979
- Gender identity: Gender change allowed since 2008; Surgery not required since 2013
- Military: LGBT people allowed to serve openly since 1993
- Discrimination protections: Constitutional protections based on sexual orientation and gender identity since 2019

Family rights
- Recognition of relationships: Same-sex marriage since 2022
- Adoption: Full adoption rights since 2022

Lesbian, gay, bisexual, transgender, and queer (LGBTQ) rights in Cuba have significantly varied throughout modern history. Cuba is now considered progressive, with vast improvements in the 21st century for such rights. Following the 2022 Cuban Family Code referendum, there is legal recognition of the right to marriage, unions between people of the same sex, same-sex adoption and non-commercial surrogacy as part of one of the most progressive Family Codes in Latin America, as well as amongst communist countries. Until the 1990s, the LGBT community was marginalized on the basis of heteronormativity, traditional gender roles, politics and strict criteria for moralism. It was not until the 21st century that the attitudes and acceptance towards LGBT people changed to be more tolerant.

In 2018, the National Assembly of People's Power voted to legalize same-sex marriage, with a constitutional referendum to be held in February 2019; it was later removed from the draft constitution. In May 2019, the government announced that the Union of Jurists of Cuba was working on the new Family Code, which would address same-sex marriage. On 7 September 2021, the government announced that the new Family Code would be brought to the National Assembly for approval, and then be put to popular vote to legalize same-sex marriage if approved in the referendum. The referendum was approved in April 2022 and took place in September 2022, with the referendum passing. Discrimination on the basis of sexual orientation and gender identity is illegal in Cuba.

Historically, public antipathy towards LGBT people was high. This has eased since the 1990s. Educational campaigns on LGBT issues are currently implemented by the National Center for Sex Education (locally known as "CENESEX"), headed by Mariela Castro, daughter of former president and First Secretary of the Communist Party of Cuba, Raúl Castro and revolutionary Vilma Espín. Pride parades in Havana are held every May, to coincide with the International Day Against Homophobia, Biphobia and Transphobia, with attendance having grown every year. In 2022, Cuba became the first Latin American country to mark LGBT History Month. In 2016, 2019, 2022 and 2025, Cuba voted in favor of renewing the mandate of the United Nations independent expert on sexual orientation and gender identity at the United Nations Human Rights Council.

== History ==
=== Pre-revolution Cuba ===
Pre-revolutionary Cuba was a place of intolerance toward the LGBT community. Due to the emphasis on traditional heteronormativity, there were few enclaves where the LGBT community could congregate together in a common space. The job market was uneven at the time and the "Afro-Hispanic culture was very patriarchal and emphasized a compulsory toxic and heterosexual society, especially in rural areas." Most of the community migrated toward Havana in search of jobs and sexual liberation. Moreover, rural communities would often alienate their LGBT community or family members deeming them the "village queer" or the "village idiot." Due to the uneven job market, Havana around the 1950s allowed for closeted occupational life and the underground job sector continued to grow aside from tourism like drug distribution, gambling, and prostitution. This job sector curtailed homosexual desire into the "Havana Underworld, which was run by the Cuban homosexual bourgeoisie." Homosexuality was a component of the thriving industry of prostitution in Cuba, with many gay men drawn into prostitution largely for visitors and servicemen from the United States. Homosexuality also was linked to gambling and crime. Therefore, while the LGBT community did not have official visibility, they had success in the job market for US tourists who were looking for homoerotic experiences. There were few LGBT-friendly bars in Cuban cities, such as the St. Michel, the Intermezzo Bar, the Dirty Dick, and El Gato Tuerto in Havana. However, despite the vibrancy of the Underworld and the breadth of its influence, Cuba still had laws that oppressed homosexuality and targeted gay men for harassment. Socially, gay men were considered outcasts. Families were often heard calling their family members "locas" meaning queens, "maricones" meaning faggots or "tortilleras" meaning dykes. The homosexual culture was purely recognized as an economic strategy where the Underworld fostered a sense of reliance on homoerotic desires by US tourists and other niche interests that the community took part in.

[D]iscrete lesbian or gay male identities in the modern sense - identities that are based on self-definition and involve emotional as well as physical aspects of same-sex relations - were rare. Erotic loyalty (and, in the case of women, subservience) to the opposite sex was assumed to be normal even by homosexuals. Hence, for many Cubans of this era, homosexuality was a mere addendum to customary marital roles. Among others, it was just a profitable commodification of sexual fantasy. For the vast majority, homosexuality made life a shameful and guilt-ridden experience.

=== Post-revolution Cuba ===
Following the emergence of Fidel Castro's régime in 1959, the visibility of the LGBT community only worsened. The revolutionary leaders were typically white middle-class men who were raised under the traditional sexual ideology. Furthermore, the Marxist–Leninist framework that the regime utilized prioritized a change in production and class relations, with an emphasis on family and sexuality. In addition, the government emphasized the youth as the future of the Revolution which was a fundamental aim of the 1960s. Education was used to promote "moralism" along with a sense of total commitment to the Revolution. Accordingly, anti-Revolutionary tactics were criticized and penalized, and listening to American music, wearing mini skirts, and men with long hair were all considered forms of anti-Revolutionary tactics along with homosexuality. The Revolution defined a qualified citizen as one who promotes a productive labor force and homosexuality along with prostitution were deemed nonproductive and related to American decadence. Furthermore, oftentimes, men who had sex with other men were caught in bar raids to crackdown on commercial sex and drugs in the 1960s. Consequently, the Committees for Defense of the Revolution began to report homosexual people in the 1960s to authorities in response to a possible US invasion. It was plain to see that homosexual individuals in Cuba were painted as anti-Revolutionary threats to the regime.

In 1965, the Ministry of Health stated that homosexuality was learned and therefore they began to implement preventative measures for children to learn of typical and traditional heterosexual normalities. "Effeminate" boys were taught to play sports, self-defense and military exercise. In addition, if men were deemed too feminine, they would be subject to expulsion from mass organizations such as the Young Communist League. There was even a sign held up on University of Havana's campus saying "no homosexual represents the Revolution, which is a matter of men, fists and not feathers, of courage and not trembling, of certainty and not intrigue, of creative valor and not of sweet surprises." Fidel Castro also stated in 1966 that "no homosexual could ever embody the conditions and requirements of conduct that would enable us to consider him a true revolutionary, a true communist militant." Overall, the homophobia that was established in the 1960s and persisted until the 2000s was a result of a combination of traditional heterosexual masculinity combined with socialist morality that identified certain sexual behaviors as non-productive. The Revolutionary Offensive was also a campaign that sought to nationalize private business in 1968, and was also a part of a greater scheme to promote morality within the political and economic campaign, which allowed Cuba to create its path as a socialist state.

==== Homophobia and labor camps during the 1960s ====
After the revolution, the superficial tolerance of LGBT persons by the strongly homophobic Cuban society quickly evaporated. Emigration to Miami began immediately, including lesbians and gay men who had worked for United States firms or had done domestic work for the native bourgeoisie. LGBT people who already had lived largely abroad moved away permanently.

[T]he homophobia and heterosexism that already existed ... became more systematized and institutionalized. Gender and sexuality explicitly entered political discourse even as vaguely worded laws increasingly targeted gender-transgressive men who were believed to be homosexual ... whereas lesbianism remained unnamed and invisible. Between 1959 and 1980[,] male homosexuals suffered a range of consequences from limited career options to detention in street sweeps to incarceration in labor camps. ... Long hair, tight pants, colorful shirts, so-called effeminate mannerisms, "inappropriate clothing," and "extravagant hairstyles" were seen as visible markers of male homosexuality. Such visible markers not only facilitated enforcement of homosexual repression; more broadly, visibility and gender transgressions themselves constituted a central part of the problem identified by the revolution. Even during the severest period of enforcement, Marvin Leiner reminds us, private homosexual expression was never the main target. Rather, "... the major concern, as it had always been, was with the public display of homosexuality."

Many of the progressive LGBT persons who remained in Cuba became involved in counter-revolutionary activities, independently or through encouragement of the Central Intelligence Agency (CIA), and were jailed. The 1961 Bay of Pigs invasion, commando attacks from Florida bases, and internal CIA-sponsored subversion created in Cuba an increased concern over national security. Realistic fears gave rise to paranoia, and anyone who was "different" fell under suspicion. Homosexual bars and La Rampa cruising areas were perceived as centers of counter-revolutionary activities and they began to be systematically treated as such. The gay community was seen as a threat to the military order.

Cuba's new ally, the Soviet Union, had hostile policies towards gays and lesbians, seeing homosexuality as a product of the decadent capitalist society prevailing in Cuba in the 1950s. Fidel Castro made insulting comments about homosexuality. Castro's admiring description of rural life in Cuba ("in the country, there are no homosexuals") reflected the idea of homosexuality as bourgeois decadence, and he denounced "maricones" as "agents of imperialism". Castro explained his reasoning in a 1965 interview:

[W]e would never come to believe that a homosexual could embody the conditions and requirements of conduct that would enable us to consider him a true Revolutionary, a true Communist militant. A deviation of that nature clashes with the concept we have of what a militant Communist must be.

According to Ian Lumsden, traditional Spanish machismo and the Catholic Church have disdained effeminate and sexually passive males for centuries. The homophobia exposed during the revolution was a mere continuation of the well-established culture of machismo and the rigid gender roles of pre-revolutionary Cuba. Barbara Weinstein, professor of Latin American history at New York University and co-editor of the Hispanic American Historical Review, said that gay people were defined as deviant and decadent but not weak or sick. She also claimed that the way that the Cuban revolution came to power gave it a stronger sense of masculinity than other revolutions. The guerrilla experience pervaded the political structure and the guerrilla army itself became the nucleus of a new society.

Cuban gay writer Reinaldo Arenas wrote, "[T]he decade of the sixties ... was precisely when all the new laws against homosexuals came into being, when the persecution started and concentration camps were opened, when the sexual act became taboo while the 'new man' was being proclaimed and masculinity was being exalted."

LGBT persons, particularly effeminate males, were frequently arrested and imprisoned without charge or trial, and confined to forced labor camps.

Camps of forced labour were instituted with all speed to "correct" such deviations ... Verbal and physical mistreatment, shaved heads, work from dawn to dusk, hammocks, dirt floors, scarce food ... The camps became increasingly crowded as the methods of arrest became more expedient ...

In 1965, the countrywide Military Units to Aid Production (Unidades Militares de Ayuda a la Producción; UMAP) program, located in the Camagüey Province, was set up as an alternative form of military service for members of pacifist religious groups, such as Jehovah's Witnesses, hippies, conscientious objectors, and gay men. It was believed that the work, together with the strict regimes operating within the UMAP camps, would "rehabilitate" the participants. The camps became notorious both inside and outside Cuba. Although the camps ended up targeting gay men more than most, "there is no evidence that [they] were created with homosexuals exclusively in mind." There is a debate whether or not these camps were labor or concentration camps. That being said, these camps were notorious for holding prisoners for up to three years without a charge.

A homosexual man who worked in a UMAP camp described the conditions there as follows, "[W]ork is hard because it's nearly always in the sun. We work 11 hours a day (cutting marble in a quarry) from seven in the morning to seven at night, with one hour's lunch break." In 1968, the camps closed. Castro said, "They weren't units of internment or punishment.... However, after a visit I discovered the distortion in some places, of the original idea, because you can't deny that there were prejudices against homosexuals. I personally started a review of this matter. Those units only lasted three years."

Many gay artists and intellectuals like Reinaldo Arenas were attracted to the socialist promise of an egalitarian society, which would pave the way for cultural and sexual freedom and social justice. Gay writers largely wrote the popular journal Lunes de Revolución. Its radical ideas seemed to enjoy the favor of the Cuban Government. But a couple of years after Castro's rise to power, this journal was closed down amidst a wave of media censorship. Its gay writers were publicly disgraced, refused publication, and dismissed from their jobs. Some were reassigned to work as janitors and labourers.

This period was dramatically documented in the 1980s documentary Improper Conduct, by Reinaldo Arenas in his 1992 autobiography, Before Night Falls, as well as in his fiction, most notably The Color of Summer and Farewell to the Sea.

==== Negative attitudes during most of the 1970s ====
Homophobia in Cuba persisted in the 1970s, with more tolerant attitudes beginning to appear in the mid-1970s.

After a discussion of homosexuality at the Cuban Educational and Cultural Congress in April 1971, homosexuality was declared to be a deviation incompatible with the revolution. Gay and lesbian artists, teachers, and actors lost their jobs. Gay and lesbian people were expelled from the Communist Party, prohibited from having contact with children and young people, not allowed to represent their country, and students were expelled from university.

A more tolerant policy slowly began to emerge in 1975.

In 1975, the People's Supreme Court found in favor of a group of marginalised gay artists who were claiming compensation and reinstatement in their place of work. The court's ruling was the initial change in official attitudes towards gays and lesbians. In the same year, a new Ministry of Culture was formed under the leadership of Armando Hart Dávalos, resulting in a more liberal cultural policy. In addition, a commission was established to investigate homosexuality, leading to the decriminalization of private, adult, non-commercial and consensual same-sex relationships in 1979.

==== Gradual liberalization during the 1980s ====
Cuban gays took the opportunity to leave Cuba during the 1980 Mariel boatlift. From the early stages of the massive exodus, the Government described homosexuals as part of the "scum" that needed to be discarded so the socialist society could be purified. Some homosexuals were given the ultimatum of either imprisonment (or extended terms for those already imprisoned) or leaving the country, although Fidel Castro publicly denied that anyone was being forced to leave.

In 1981, the Ministry of Culture stated in a publication entitled "In Defence of Love" that homosexuality was a variant of human sexuality. The ministry argued that homophobic bigotry was an unacceptable attitude inherited by the revolution and that all sanctions against gays should be opposed.

In 1986, the National Commission on Sex Education publicly opined that homosexuality was a sexual orientation and that homophobia should be countered by education. Gay author Ian Lumsden has claimed that since 1986 there is "little evidence to support the contention that the persecution of homosexuals remains a matter of state policy".

In 1988, the Government repealed the Public Ostentation Law of 1938 (Spanish: Ley de ostentación pública de 1938) and the police received orders not to harass LGBT people. In a 1988 interview with Galician television, Castro criticized the rigid attitudes that had prevailed towards homosexuality.

Toward the end of the 1980s, literature with gay subject matter began to re-emerge.

==== More rapid acceptance since 1990 ====
In a 1993 interview with a former Nicaraguan government official, Tomás Borge, Fidel Castro declared that he opposed policies against LGBT people as he considered homosexuality to be a natural tendency that should be respected. The same year, a series of sex education workshops were run throughout the country carrying the message that homophobia was a prejudice. That same year, the Government lifted its ban on allowing LGBT persons from serving openly in the military. Since 1993, lesbian, gay, bisexual and transgender persons may serve openly in the Cuban Revolutionary Armed Forces.

In 1994, the feature film Strawberry and Chocolate, produced by the government-run Cinema of Cuba and Tomás Gutiérrez Alea, featured a gay main character. The film criticized the country's narrow, doctrinaire ways of thinking in the 1970s and discussed anti-gay prejudice and the unjust treatment suffered by gays. The film provoked a great deal of comment and discussion among the public.

In 1995, Cuban drag queens led the annual May Day procession, joined by two gay delegations from the United States. In the same year, Fidel Castro recanted his previous anti-LGBT sentiment, saying: "I am absolutely opposed to all forms of oppression, contempt, scorn, or discrimination with regard to homosexuals".

According to a Human Rights Watch report, "the government [in 1997] ... heightened harassment of homosexuals, raiding several nightclubs known to have gay clientele and allegedly beating and detaining dozens of patrons." Spanish filmmaker Pedro Almodóvar was reported to be among several hundred people detained in a raid on Havana's most popular gay discothèque, El Periquiton. According to a United States government report, Cuban customers of the club were fined and warned of imprisonment if they did not stop publicly displaying their homosexuality. The foreigners who were detained were released after a check of their documents. Many of the Cuban gay and lesbian clientele were reportedly beaten by police. This crackdown extended to other known gay meeting places throughout the capital, such as Mi Cayito, a beach east of Havana, where gays were arrested, fined, or threatened with imprisonment.

After this crackdown, Cuban gays and lesbians began keeping a lower profile amid intermittent sweeps of gay and lesbian meeting places. Castro's apparent criticism of Tomás Gutiérrez Alea and his last film Guantanamera during a speech in February 1998 seemed to cast a further chill over Cuba's gay community. Still, a number of clandestine gay clubs continued to operate sporadically in private homes.

In December 2000, half of all the Latin American films shown at the Havana Film Festival had gay themes. Gay and lesbian film festivals are now run in a number of Cuban cities, and in October 2005, a Sexual Diversity Cinema Week was held in Pinar del Río.

Yet, in 2001, the police operated a campaign against gay and trans people, and prevented them from meeting in the street, fined them and closed down meeting places.

In 2004, the soap opera El jardín de los helechos (Garden of Ferns) included a lesbian couple as part of its plot. That same year, however, the BBC reported that "Cuban police have once again launched a campaign against homosexuals, specifically directed at travestis (transvestites) whom they are arresting if they are dressed in women's clothing."

Carlos Sanchez, the male representative of the International Lesbian, Gay, Trans and Intersex Association for the Latin America and Caribbean Region, visited Cuba in 2004. While there, he asked about the status of lesbians and gays in the country and asked the Cuban Government why it had abstained from the vote on the "Brazilian Resolution", a 2003 proposal to the United Nations Commission on Human Rights that would symbolically recognize the "occurrence of violations of human rights in the world against persons on the grounds of their sexual orientation." The Government argued that the resolution could be used to further attack and isolate Arab countries, consistent with "North American aggression against Afghanistan and Iraq". Sanchez also asked about the possibility of creating an LGBT organization in Cuba. The Government said that the formation of the organization would distract attention from national security in light of constant threats from the United States. After meeting with some Cuban LGBT people, Sanchez reported the following observations:

1. "Neither institutional nor penal repression exists against lesbians and homosexuals."
2. "There are no legal sanctions against LGBT people."
3. "People are afraid of meeting and organizing themselves. It is mainly based on their experience in previous years, but one can assume that this feeling will disappear in the future if lesbians and gays start to work and keep working and eventually get support from the government. (The National Center for Sexual Education is offering this support)."
4. "'Transformismo' (drag performance) is well accepted by the majority of the Cuban population."
5. "There is indeed a change in the way people view homosexuality, but this does not mean the end of discrimination and homophobia. The population is just more tolerant of lesbians and homosexuals."
6. "Lesbians and gays do not consider fighting for the right to marriage, because that institution in Cuba does not have the same value that it has in other countries. Unmarried and married people enjoy equal rights."

In 2006, the state-run Cuban television began running a serial soap opera titled La Otra Cara De La Luna (The Other Face of the Moon) in which a married man "discovers himself" through a sexual relationship with a male friend.

In 2012, Adela Hernández became the first known transgender person to hold public office in Cuba, winning election as a delegate to the City Council of Caibarien in the central province of Villa Clara.

==== Fidel Castro admits responsibility ====
In his autobiography My Life, Fidel Castro criticized the machismo culture of Cuba and urged for the acceptance of homosexuality. He made several speeches to the public regarding discrimination against homosexuals.

In a 2010 interview with Mexican newspaper La Jornada, Castro called the persecution of homosexuals while he was in power "a great injustice, great injustice!" Taking responsibility for the persecution, he said, "If anyone is responsible, it's me.... We had so many and such terrible problems, problems of life or death. In those moments, I was not able to deal with that matter [of homosexuals]. I found myself immersed, principally, in the Crisis of October, in the war, in policy questions." Castro personally said that the negative treatment of gays in Cuba arose out of the country's pre-revolutionary attitudes toward homosexuality.

==== Incidents 2019–2020 ====
In May 2019, the state-run National Center for Sex Education, or Cenesex, abruptly canceled its 12th annual march against homophobia (pride parade). CENESEX, led by Mariela Castro, said only that "international and regional tensions" meant the parade had to be cancelled. According to the Miami Herald, this abrupt change was also motivated by increasing resistance to LGBT protections by Christian groups in Cuba, with the government hoping to avoid violent confrontations with more conservative elements. LGBT Activists condemned the cancellation and organised their own demonstration, largely through social media. Cenesex told activists not to attend the event, with some reporting receiving calls from state security. The march went on, but after setting out the marchers came up against a large number of police and state security forces. At least three were arrested with the rest ordered to disperse.

In August 2019, Leandro Rodríguez García, director of the Cuban Foundation for LGBTI Rights, was pulled from the departure lounge at the José Martí International Airport while awaiting a flight to Miami, Florida. Officials told him he was not allowed to leave Cuba and prevented him from boarding, despite him having obtained a US visa. In December, Journalist Maykel González Vivero, director and one of the founders of Tremenda Nota, the Spanish media partner for the Washington Blade, was prohibited from traveling outside the country by the Cuban Interior Ministry. Nelson Julio Álvarez Mairata, an LGBTI YouTuber who had recently worked as a reporter for Tremenda Nota, was similarly prohibited from travel outside of Cuba. A series of hacks in 2019 targeted LGBTI reporters social media pages, with posts referencing their sexual orientation in a negative way and the release of private photos, often having sexual content.

In 2020, the state-run Cuban Institute of Radio and Television censored out the kiss scene between the lead male character and another boy in the 2018 U.S. film Love, Simon. Activists criticized the decision and began to organize a "kiss-in" protest of the censorship. The government, shortly before the kiss-in, published an apology for the "mistake" of editing out the gay kiss and organizers cancelled the protest.

=== Machismo and homophobia ===
Where machismo and patriarchy are often conflated, they are not the same. Patriarchy is a structure that allows for male superiority and male dominance but is generic whereas machismo has cultural implications that combines Latin American and Caribbean colonial history. Machismo is specific to Latin American culture. As a result of this culture, female sexuality was "mystified" and misunderstood, allowing many lesbians to escape prejudice where gay men could not.

== Legality of same-sex sexual activity ==
Private, non-commercial sexual relations between same-sex consenting adults 16 and over have been legal in Cuba since 1979.

The Social Defence Code, which characterized "homosexual practices" as a "social threat" and imposed preventive measures to combat it, was repealed in 1979 by the Penal Code of Cuba. This Code did not criminalize homosexuality per se. However, Article 359(1) criminalized those who made "public display of their homosexual condition" or bothered or solicited others with "homosexual requests". The crime of "public display of homosexual condition" was repealed in 1987 and the crime of bothering or soliciting with "homosexual requests" was amended in 1997 to refer only to "sexual" requests.

=== Prostitution ===
Prostitution in Cuba has always been legal but has gone through periods of restriction and regulation over the years. Because of this, sex tourism in Cuba blossomed in the post-colonial era, giving way to a different type of chosen family. However, prostitution in Cuba began a period of significant decline in 1998 and was no longer widespread or openly seen in Cuban tourist hotspots by 2007. In 2015, Anthropological Quarterly reported that through sex work, many gay Cuban men are able to gain autonomy and sex tourists sometimes ultimately support them and their families. The dynamic between sex workers and clients reportedly evolves into a gay kinship that expands to the Cuban family. This unique relationship is important to understand the connection between finances, gay Cuban men, and sex tourists.

== Recognition of same-sex relationships ==
The Cuban Constitution does not ban same-sex marriage. Until 2019, Article 36 contained language defining marriage as between a man and a woman. This was repealed in a February 2019 referendum. The current Constitution states that "marriage is a social and legal institution. ... It is based on free will and equality of rights, obligations and legal capacity of the spouses."

A major public campaign by LGBT groups began in late 2017 to amend the Constitution to allow same-sex marriage. In July 2018, the National Assembly approved a new draft constitution which recognized same-sex marriage in Article 68. Amidst pressure from evangelical churches who opposed same-sex marriage—even though President Miguel Díaz-Canel expressed his support for same-sex marriage that September—the National Assembly withdrew the language on 18 December 2018. As a result of removing the article, same-sex marriage is neither prohibited nor regulated by the new Cuban Constitution. Had the article remained in the draft, it would have needed to go to a referendum in February 2019. Nevertheless, media outlets spoke of a "revolution within a revolution" or of a "rainbow revolution", and pointed out how quickly the political and societal landscape for LGBT rights has changed.

The National Assembly and Mariela Castro have stated that same-sex marriage will be legalized through a Family Code amendment instead. In March 2019, the Government began popular consultations to look into legalizing same-sex marriage in the Family Code. A referendum on the proposed new Family Code, which would include same-sex marriage, civil unions, adoption by same-sex couples and altruistic surrogacy, was held in September 2022, and passed. The new family law was signed by Cuban president Miguel Díaz-Canel on 26 September 2022, and came into effect the following day, after being published on the Official Gazette.

== Discrimination protections ==
Employment discrimination on account of sexual orientation is prohibited by law. The Labor Code (Código de Trabajo) does not cover gender identity, and LGBT discrimination in other sectors of society – such as education, housing and public accommodations – is not addressed by the law. Mariela Castro, director of the National Center for Sex Education, had also sought to ban employment discrimination on the basis of gender identity, HIV status and disability, but this was rejected.

In July 2018, a same-sex couple, Brian Canelles and Arián Abreu, were kicked out of a Havana bar after taking a selfie of themselves kissing. A worker at the bar asked them to leave, saying: "The bar isn't interested in the gay public. We don't want that reputation." The case was widely criticized. Merely two days after the incident, Cuba's official gazette published a decree outlining that any private business found to discriminate against clients based on their gender or sexual orientation can be fined 1,000 Cuban pesos (around 847 Euros or 1000 USD) and shut down.

The Cuban Constitution, amended in 2019, prohibits all discrimination on the basis of gender, gender identity and sexual orientation, among others. Article 42 reads as follows:

All people are equal before the law, receive the same protection and treatment from the authorities, and enjoy the same rights, liberties, and opportunities, without any discrimination for reasons of sex, gender, sexual orientation, gender identity, age, ethnic origin, skin color, religious belief, disability, national or territorial origin, or any other personal condition or circumstance that implies a distinction injurious to human dignity. (Note: In Spanish: Todas las personas son iguales ante la ley, reciben la misma protección y trato de las autoridades y gozan de los mismos derechos, libertades y oportunidades, sin ninguna discriminación por razones de sexo, género, orientación sexual, identidad de género, edad, origen étnico, color de la piel, creencia religiosa, discapacidad, origen nacional o territorial, o cualquier otra condición o circunstancia personal que implique distinción lesiva a la dignidad humana.)

== Gender identity and expression ==
Since June 2008, qualifying Cubans have been able to have free sex reassignment surgeries under Resolución 126 ("Resolution 126"). The resolution consisted of 11 articles that outlined the ways in which the Cuban Government aimed to improve their treatment of the trans community. Article 5 explicitly states, that the state should provide comprehensive health care to "all transsexual citizens" and it is also relevant that "one of the articles contains a glossary that defines various terms associated with health care for transsexual and transgender persons."

As many scholars suggest, the Cuban Government treats trans rights and sex reassignment surgeries as a health issue. Cuba operates under the idea that healthcare is a right to all, allowing trans people access to public health care.

In 1979, the Ministry of Public Health (MIN-SAP) established the Multidisciplinary Commission for Attention to Transsexuals to provide both specialized health care and social services. Mariela Castro Espín describes it: "specialists in the care of transsexual persons, and ... adopted internationally approved diagnostic and therapeutic procedures, which were incorporated as services offered free of charge by the [National Public Health System], along with courses to train sex therapists."

In July 2025, the National Assembly passed a law allowing people to change their gender and surnames in the national civil registry without reassignment surgery. The law also gave legal recognition to common-law marriages.

== Blood donation ==
Individuals seeking to donate blood must be in good health, have a regular pulse and must not have had a viral infection (catarrh or pharyngitis) within the past seven days. Men who have sex with men are not explicitly banned from donating.

== Social conditions ==
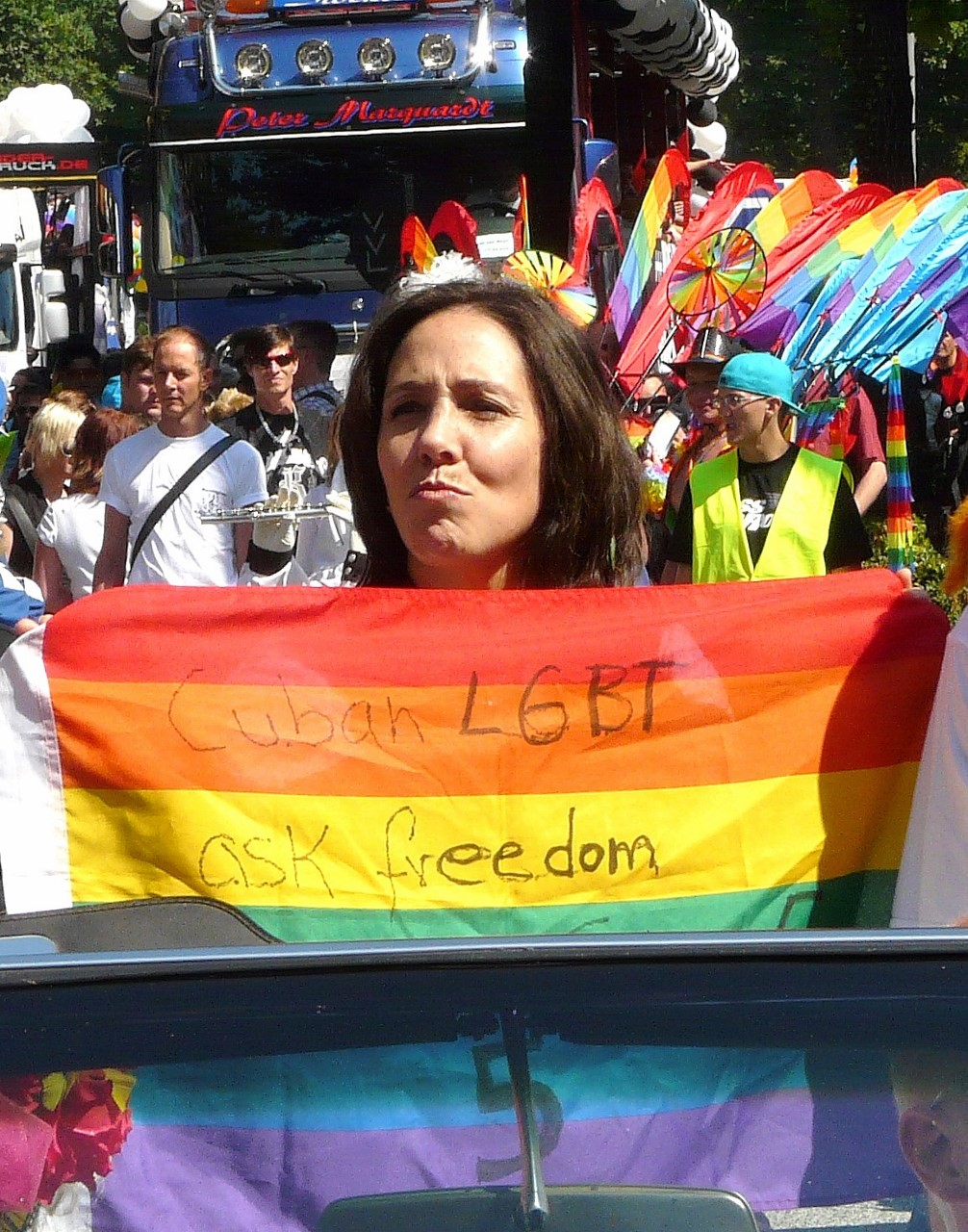
Mariela Castro, daughter of Raúl Castro, is one of Cuba's most prominent LGBT activists.

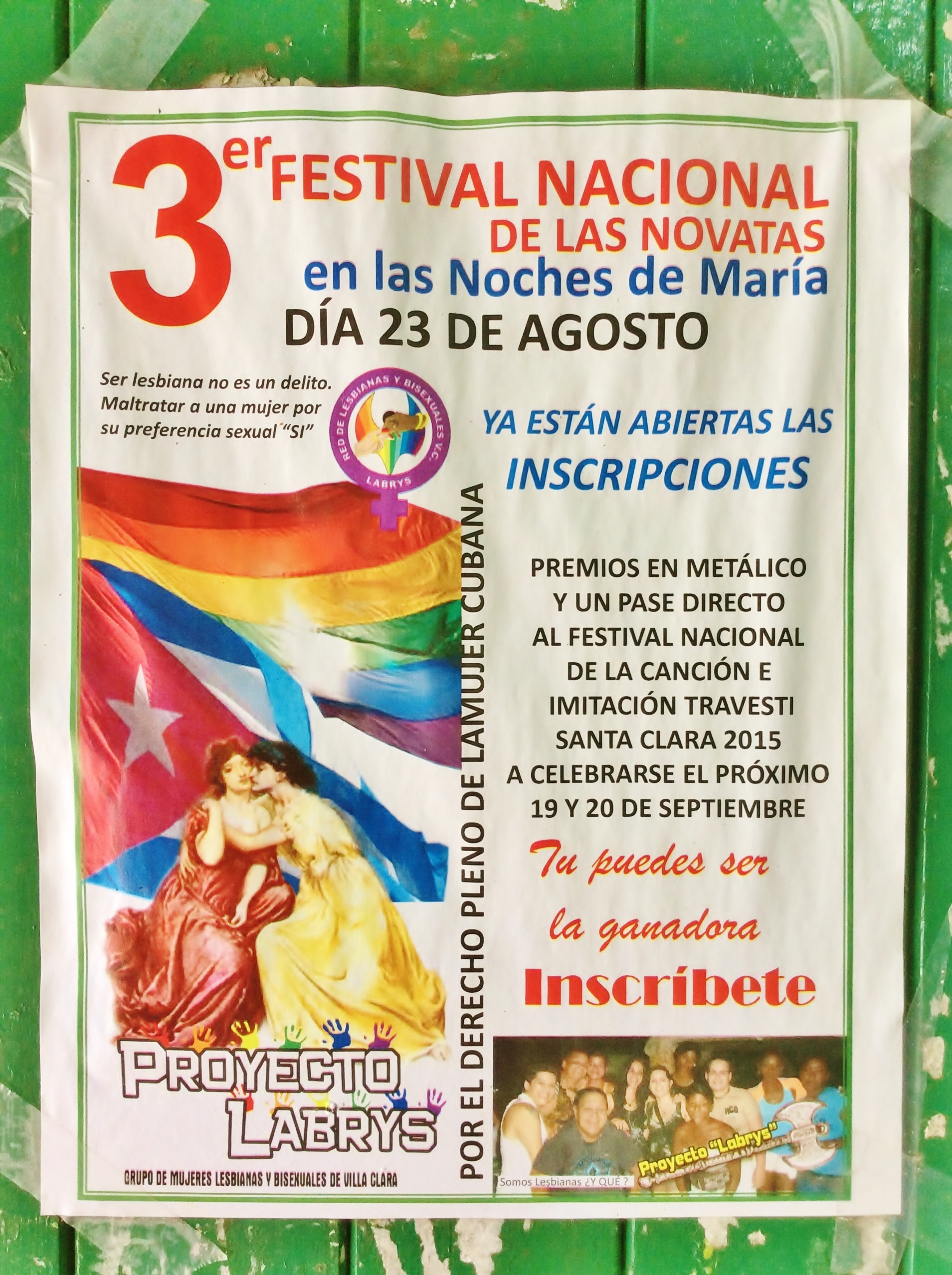
Poster of a transvestite festival organised by the Grupo de Mujeres Lesbianas y Bisexuales (Group of Lesbian and Bisexual Women) in Santa Clara

=== Freedom of association ===
According to the International Lesbian, Gay, Bisexual, Trans and Intersex Association and other sources, one of Cuba's only gay and lesbian civil rights organizations, the Cuban Association of Gays and Lesbians (Asociación Cubana de Gays y Lesbianas), was formed in 1994 by eighteen people but was effectively shut down and its members arrested in 1997.

Since 2008, the National Center of Sex Education has sponsored some LGBT festivals and pride events.

In 2013, a week of drag shows, colorful marches, and social and cultural events in Havana culminated with celebrations of the International Day Against Homophobia. Events have been held every year since.

=== Nosotros también amamos ===
In 2015, the project Nosotros también amamos ("We love too") which advocates for the legalization of same-sex marriage, was funded by the human rights organizations Corriente Martiana ("Martian Current"), Fundación Cubana por los Derechos LGBTI ("Cuban Foundation for LGBTI Rights") and the gay project SHUI TUIX.

In June 2016, Babel, a socio-cultural Cuban LGBT project, declared, "all people are equal in dignity and rights beyond what differentiates us as race, skin color, sex, national origin, political, religious, ideological or sexual preferences, amongst other things"

== Works ==
=== Films ===
- Lizette Vila's documentary films, Y hembra es el alma mía (1992) and Sexualidad: un derecho a la vida (2004), profile the lives of Cuban male-to-female transsexuals and travestis.
- Mauvaise Conduite or Improper Conduct is a 1984 documentary film directed by Néstor Almendros and Orlando Jiménez Leal about the UMAP labor camps.
- Before Night Falls (2000), directed by Julian Schnabel, is based on the autobiography of Reinaldo Arenas by the same name.
- Fresa y Chocolate, (Strawberry and Chocolate, 1993) directed by Tomás Gutiérrez Alea and Juan Carlos Tabío, focuses on a conflicted relationship between a committed Marxist student and a flamboyantly gay artist. It was the first Cuban film to be nominated for the Academy Award for Best International Feature Film.

=== Books ===
- Furia del Discurso Humano ("The Fury of Human Discourse") is a novel by Miguel Correa Mujica, the celebrated author of Al Norte del Infierno, that addresses the topic of persecution of homosexuals in Cuba.

== Summary table ==
Same-sex sexual activity legal	Yes (Since 1979)
Equal age of consent (16)	Yes (Since 1979)
Anti-discrimination laws in employment	Yes (Since 2013)
Anti-discrimination laws in the provision of goods and services	Yes (Since 2018)
Anti-discrimination laws in all other areas (incl. indirect discrimination, hate speech)	Yes (Since 2019)
Anti-discrimination laws concerning gender identity	No (Since 2019)
Same-sex marriage	Yes (Since 2022)
Same-sex civil unions	Yes (Since 2022)
Recognition of same-sex couples	Yes (Since 2022)
Stepchild adoption by same-sex couples	Yes (Since 2022)
Joint adoption by same-sex couples	Yes (Since 2022)
LGBT people allowed to serve openly in the military	Yes (Since 1993)
Right to change legal gender	Yes (Since 2008)
Gender self-identification	Yes (Since 2025)
Legal recognition of non-binary gender	No
Access to IVF for lesbians	Yes
Altruistic surrogacy for gay male couples	Yes (Since 2022)
Altruistic surrogacy for lesbians	
Altruistic surrogacy for transgender people	
Commercial surrogacy for gay male couples	No
Commercial surrogacy for lesbians	
Commercial surrogacy for transgender people	
Conversion therapy banned by law	No
LGBT anti-bullying law in schools	No (As of 2017)
MSM allowed to donate blood	Yes

== See also ==
- CENESEX, National Center for Sex Education
- El Mejunje
- Ediciones El Puente
- Same-sex marriage in Cuba
- Strawberry and Chocolate

General:

- Human rights in Cuba
- Socialism and LGBT rights
- Communism and LGBT rights
- LGBT rights in the Americas
