= Mariela Castro =

Former First Lady of Cuba (born 1962)

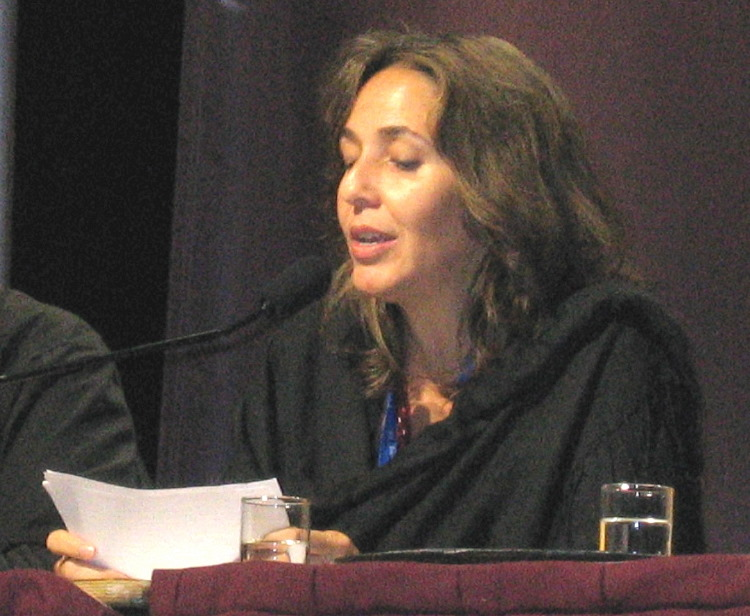
- Mariela Castro addressing the Latin America plenary of the International Conference on LGBT Human Rights in Montreal, 2006

Director of the Cuban National Center for Sex Education
- Incumbent
- Assumed office 2000
- President: Fidel Castro; Raúl Castro; Miguel Diaz-Canel
- Preceded by: Monika Krause-Fuchs

Personal details
- Born: Mariela Castro Espín; 27 July 1962 (age 63) Havana, Cuba
- Party: CPC
- Children: 3
- Parents: Raúl Castro (father); Vilma Espín (mother)
- Relatives: Alejandro Castro Espín (brother); Ángel Castro y Argiz (grandfather); Fidel Castro (uncle); Ramón Castro (uncle); Juanita Castro (aunt); Alina Fernández (cousin); Fidel Castro Díaz-Balart (cousin)

Mariela Castro Espín (born 27 July 1962) is the director of the Cuban National Center for Sex Education in Havana, as well as the National Commission for Comprehensive Attention to Transsexual People, and an activist for LGBT rights in Cuba. Castro is an outspoken advocate for the LGBT+ community as well as dissolving some of the antiquated stigmas and stereotypes that surround the community. She is the daughter of former Communist Party First Secretary Raúl Castro and feminist and revolutionary Vilma Espín, and the niece of former First Secretary Fidel Castro.

== Early life ==
Mariela Castro is the daughter of former Communist Party First Secretary Raúl Castro and feminist and revolutionary Vilma Espín, and the niece of former First Secretary and prominent Cuban revolutionary Fidel Castro. She has a brother, Alejandro Castro Espín. Castro states that as a child, she grew up in a homophobic society where members of the LGBT+ community were targeted relentlessly in terms of both law and policy and societal standards and traditional expectations. Castro stated later in life that she and her peers would "laugh at gays, make fun of them". After speaking with some of her friends in the LGBT+ community, however, she gained a newfound awareness of the issues they face. Castro studied modern dance and child psychology.

== Career ==
Castro has published 13 scholarly articles and nine books. On September 26, 2019, it was revealed that the administration of President of the United States, Donald Trump, issued a travel ban on Cuban leader Raúl Castro and his children as a result of Castro's support for Venezuela, spearheaded by Venezuelan President Nicolas Maduro. United States Secretary of State Mike Pompeo stated that "[Raul] Castro is responsible for Cuba's actions to prop up the former Maduro regime in Venezuela through violence, intimidation and repression."

=== Cuban National Center for Sex Education ===
Castro is the director of the Cuban National Center for Sex Education, or CENESEX, which promotes safe sex and healthy attitudes towards sexuality. She modeled CENESEX after the Federation of Cuban Women, which was established by her mother in 1960. The Federation of Cuban Women, along with other organizations at the time, was created as a result of women and other members of marginalized groups expressing their readiness to be involved in social change. One of their major efforts included a proposal for a change to the government family code that defined marriage as a union between two people, regardless of gender. Castro once stated in an interview that the federation "spearheaded efforts to confront machismo in many arenas." After the Federation was established, the public, economic, and social position of women in Cuba at the time rose dramatically – employment and equal pay opportunities for women arose, as well as maternity leave and the concept of social security for women. In 1996, along with the Cuban Ministries of Education (MINED), the Cuban National Center for Sex Education created a National Sex Education Program for Cuban schools to teach children about sex in terms of procreation and as a means of pleasure and holistic well-being, gender equality, sexual violence, and sexually transmitted infections.

Castro's work and research with CENESEX, as well as various organizations that are centered on the research about and the lowering of stigma surrounding HIV/AIDS, has led to immense positive changes in the sexual health in Cuba as a whole. Cuba has one of the lowest HIV infection rates. In addition, those with the virus have access to free antiretroviral drugs through the country's health system. She is also president of the Cuban Multidisciplinary Centre for the Study of Sexuality, president of the National Commission for Treatment of Disturbances of Gender Identity, member of the Direct Action Group for Preventing, Confronting, and Combatting AIDS, an executive member of the World Association for Sexual Health (WAS), and the director of the journal Sexología y Sociedad, a magazine of Sexology edited by CENESEX.

In 2008, the CENESEX and the National Commission for Comprehensive Attention to Transsexual People established May as an awareness month about LGBT issues, specifically homophobia and transphobia. The month of May is turned into a month of awareness as well as festive activities centered around and planned by members of the LGBT+ community, and is centered around the annual International Day Against Homophobia on May 17. The National Commission for Comprehensive Attention to Transsexual People campaigns for effective AIDS prevention as well as recognition and acceptance of LGBT human rights.

=== LGBT rights ===
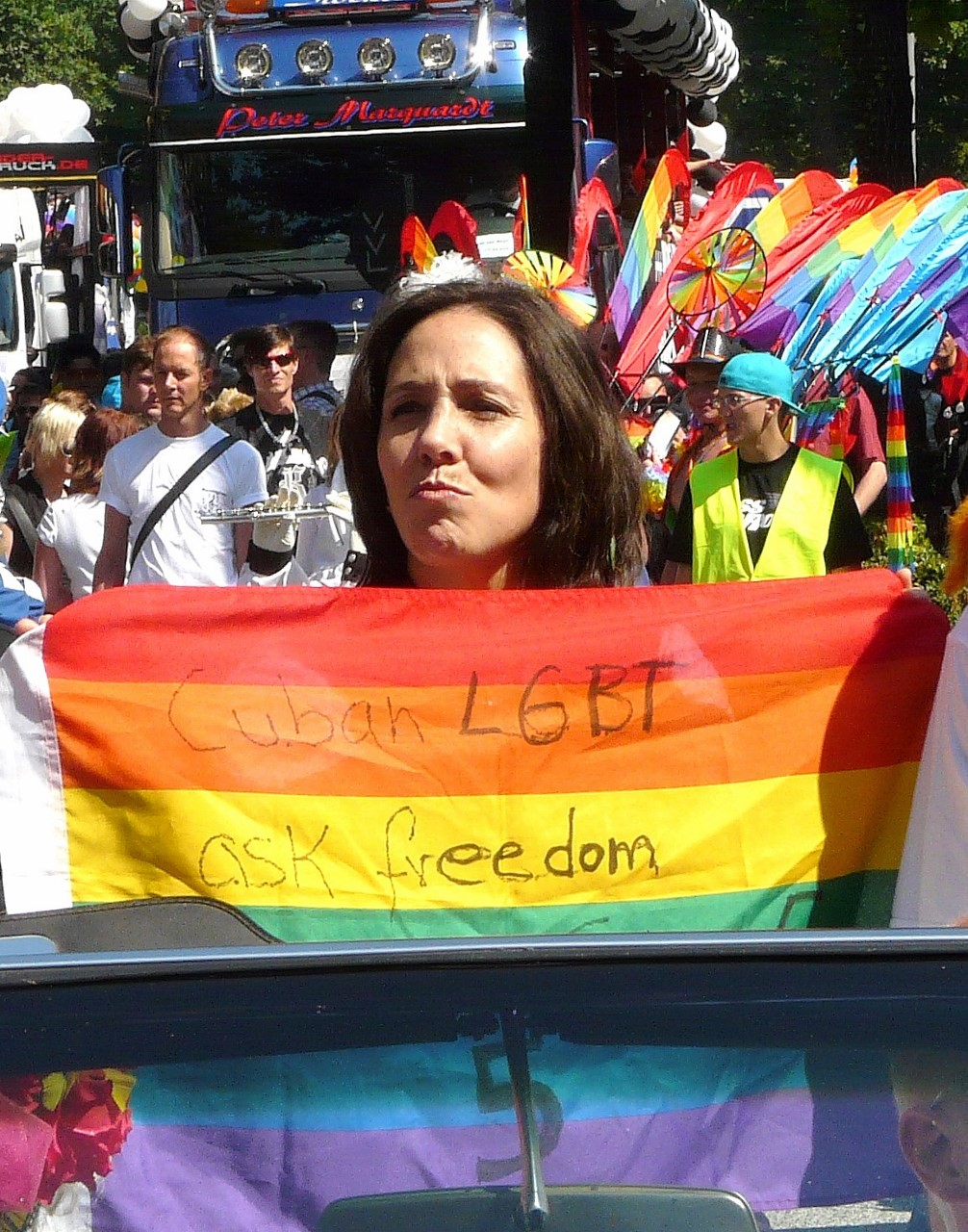
Mariela Castro at the 2010 Pride parade in Hamburg

In 2004, Castro met with a group of transgender people that sought assistance from her. In 2005, Castro proposed a project to allow transgender people to receive sex reassignment surgery and change their legal sex. The measure became law in June 2008 which allows sex change surgery for Cubans without charge. Since the project proposal became law, the National Commission for Comprehensive Attention to Transsexual People has attended to more than 120 applications and has performed nearly a dozen surgeries.

Castro is a sitting member of the National Assembly of People's Power. When the assembly voted in 2014 to ban discrimination on the basis of sexual orientation in employment, Castro opposed the legislation because it did not also include protection on the basis of gender identity, and became the first legislator in the body's history ever to vote against a piece of legislation.

On May 5, 2013, Castro traveled to Philadelphia in order to accept an award from Equality Forum, a nonprofit organization centered on awareness for the LGBT+ community, for her work with her organizations that spread awareness about the issues that those in the LGBT+ community face. The leader and founder of the group, Malcom Lazin, stated that she was "truly an international hero for LGBT equality" and that she made "remarkable changes for LGBT Cubans".

In May 2018 at a press conference, Castro announced that she would push for same-sex marriage to be included in a constitutional reform beginning in July. Castro also stated the need for tougher sanctions for anti-LGBT+ discrimination and violence. In 2019, a yearly march against homophobia and transphobia was cancelled by Castro due to regional tensions, which the Miami Herald reported as being "to avoid confrontations with Christian groups."

=== Foreign affairs ===
In November 2023, one month into the Gaza war, Castro published an article in Workers' World newspaper, stating that: "Palestine is and will always be an Arab land, together with its original Christians and Jews. Its martyrs will rise from the ashes to continue fighting for the full sovereignty of Palestine and for world peace." Castro condemned the murder of Hezbollah leader Hassan Nasrallah in September 2024. The Hebrew Community of Cuba accused her of antisemitism after she declared that there is not a "Jewish people", only a Jewish religion.

== Personal life ==
As of 2000, according to a former assistant of Raúl Castro, Mariela Castro was married to an Italian man and had two children with him, and one child from a previous marriage.

== General references ==
- Negrón-Muntaner, Frances (December 2008). "'Mariconerías' de Estado: Mariela Castro, los homosexuales y la política cubana". Nueva Sociedad (in Spanish). 218: 163–179.
- Alpert, Jon (2016-11-28). Mariela Castro's March: Cuba's LGBT Revolution (Television production). HBO.

== See also ==
Mariela Castro's March: Cuba's LGBT Revolution
