= Mariela Castro's March: Cuba's LGBT Revolution =

2016 documentary film

- Directed by: Jon Alpert
- Original language: Spanish

Production
- Running time: 39 minutes

Original release
- Network: HBO
- Release: 2016

Mariela Castro's March: Cuba's LGBT Revolution is a 2016 documentary film by Jon Alpert for HBO about Mariela Castro's (Raúl Castro's daughter and Fidel Castro's niece) LGBT advocacy work in Cuba.

== See also ==
- LGBTQ rights in Cuba
