= Limbach-Oberfrohna =

Town in Saxony, Germany

- Town
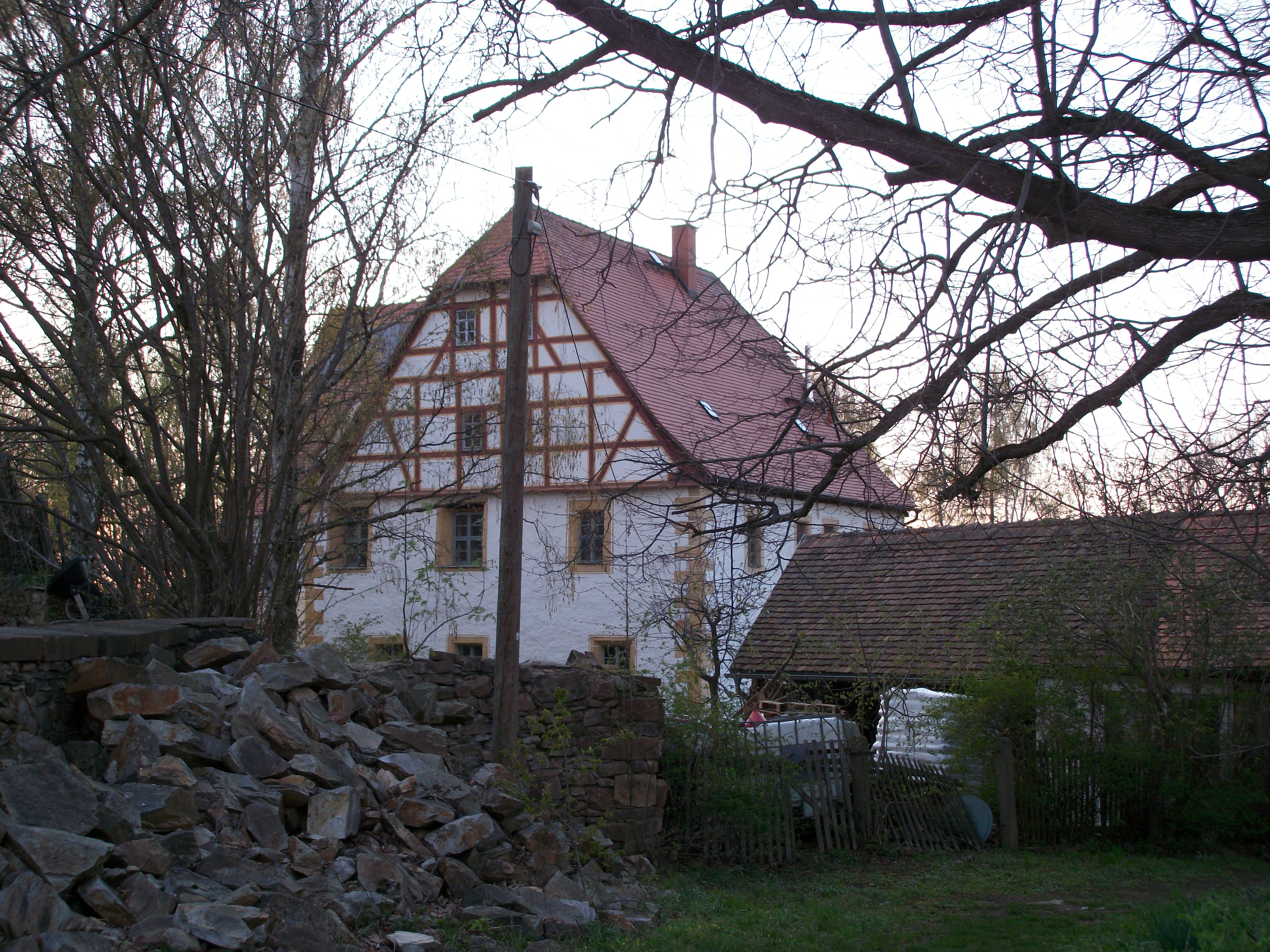
- Kaufungen Castle in Limbach-Oberfrohna

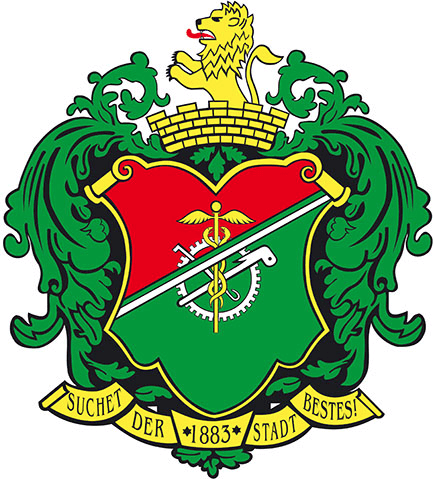
- Coat of arms

- Location of Limbach-Oberfrohna within Zwickau district
- Interactive map of Limbach-Oberfrohna
- Location within Germany Location within Saxony
- Coordinates: 50°52′N 12°45′E
- Country: Germany
- State: Saxony
- District: Zwickau
- Subdivisions: 7

Government
  - Mayor (2022–29): Gerd Härtig (FW)

Area
  - Total: 50.21 km^{2} (19.39 sq mi)
- Elevation: 349 m (1,145 ft)

Population (2025-12-31)
  - Total: 23,394
  - Density: 465.9/km^{2} (1,207/sq mi)
- Time zone: UTC+01:00 (CET)
  - Summer (DST): UTC+02:00 (CEST)
- Postal codes: 09212
- Dialling codes: 03722, 037609
- Vehicle registration: Z
- Website: www.limbach-oberfrohna.de

Limbach-Oberfrohna (German pronunciation: [ˈlɪmbax ʔoːbɐˈfʁoːna]) is a town in the district of Zwickau in Saxony, Germany.

== History ==
=== From the City's Founding in 1950 to 1990 ===
The twin city of Limbach-Oberfrohna was formed on 1 July 1950, through the merger of the two cities of Limbach and Oberfrohna (lit. 'Upper Frohna', in contrast to "Lower Frohna"). The still young city was incorporated into the Chemnitz district during the territorial reform of 1952, then Karl-Marx-Stadt-Land, which was part of the corresponding district of the GDR. During GDR times, the Pioneer Holiday Camp Clara Zetkin was established, where children from West Germany could also spend their vacations.

=== Since 1990 ===
After the fall of the Berlin Wall, the corresponding district continued as the Chemnitz district in the reconstituted Free State of Saxony. On October 1, 1994, Limbach-Oberfrohna was granted the special status of a major district town. On 1 January 2000, the administrative community with Niederfrohna was formed. Since August 2008, Limbach-Oberfrohna has been part of the Zwickau district. For years, a group of youths and their meeting places were attacked by neo-Nazis. In order to protect them, their parents founded the Colorful Citizens Forum for Democracy. The city, police, and regional press spoke of conflicts between individuals "from the left and right of the spectrum." Later, the Zwickau District Court convicted Nico D. as the ringleader of the right-wing extremist scene for arson, bodily harm, and use of unconstitutional symbols, and sentenced him to 2 1/2 years in prison. The prosecutor clarified that there had been no diffuse gang warfare in Limbach-Oberfrohna; rather, he only knew of cases with right-wing perpetrators and left-wing victims. In 2011, the Colorful Citizens Forum for Democracy Limbach-Oberfrohna was awarded the Saxon Democracy Award. During a hearing in the Interior Committee of the Saxon State Parliament on 9 February 2012, the head of the Chemnitz-Erzgebirge Police Directorate, Uwe Reißmann, stated that since 2008, there had been increased right-wing crime in the region, for which he held the Autonomous Nationalists Limbach-Oberfrohna (who later renamed themselves National Resistance Limbach-Oberfrohna) responsible; their stated goal had been to violently create a "nationally liberated zone." At the same event, the political scientist Hajo Funke stated that municipal politics and police had criminally neglected consistent law enforcement in Limbach-Oberfrohna, so that there was a danger that "everyday terror could escalate into something worse." Neo-Nazis in the region were capable of such massive violence that fear and intimidation disrupted the climate in the city. In the summer of 2012, initial negotiations took place between the district of Meinsdorf in the municipality of Callenberg and Limbach-Oberfrohna regarding incorporation. The reason for this is the close cultural ties to Limbach-Oberfrohna and the expectation that Callenberg could merge with Hohenstein-Ernstthal in the future. From 2 to 4 September 2016, the 25th Day of Saxony took place in Limbach-Oberfrohna. During this time (on Saturday, 3 September 2016), a new world record was set in Mensch ärgere Dich nicht with 1052 players. In 2022, Limbach-Oberfrohna made national headlines due to the debate over the voting behavior of its municipal parliament: In September 2022, the city council of Limbach-Oberfrohna rejected two of five proposals for persons to be honored with Stolperstein. The rejection occurred with votes from the CDU, the Free Voters, and the AfD, on the grounds that Max Tennler and Arno Förster, who were shot by Nazis, were members of the KPD (Communist Party of Germany) and therefore "not well disposed towards democracy." As a result, the initiator of the action, councilor Albert Klepper (Greens), questioned the entire honoring, stating that "no distinctions should be made" among the victims. Critics of the voting behavior accused the CDU of publicly positioning themselves before the vote in a way that they should have foreseen how the AfD would vote.

== Main sights ==
- Schloss (Castle) Wolkenburg
- Protestant church in Oberfrohna
- Wasserturm ("Water Tower")
- Limbach Municipal Church

=== Town hall ===
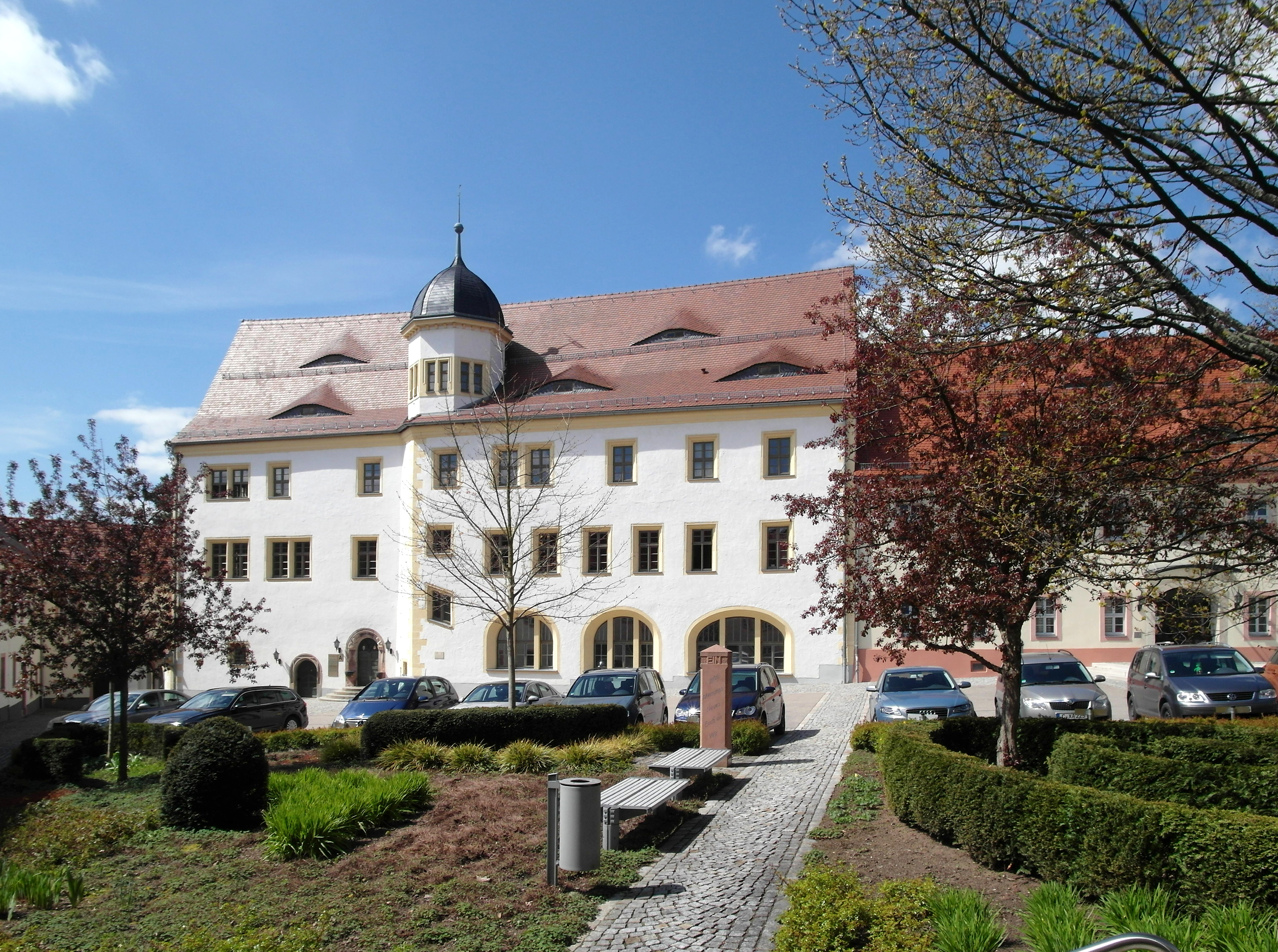
Former manor house, now the Town Hall

The town hall was previously the manor house. It was acquired by Friedrich Ludwig Leuschner in 1863 and sold by Otto Leuschner to the municipality in 1911.

== Economy ==
Limbach-Oberfrohna is situated in the manufacturing district of Chemnitz. It has a public park and a monument to the composer Johannes Pache. Its industries in the past included the making of worsteds, cloth, silk and sewing machines, dyeing and bleaching. However, these industries collapsed almost completely after the reunification of Germany in 1990. Today, the biggest employers in the town are Siemens VDO, a former branch of the Siemens AG and manufacturer of car-supplies together with other mechanical-engineering firms.

== Transport ==
The town is situated near the Bundesautobahn 4 and Bundesautobahn 72. Chemnitz, a city with a long existing mechanical-engineering-industry, is situated about 15 km to the east of Limbach-Oberfrohna.

== Notable people ==
- Siegfried Schnabl (born 1927), sexologist and psychotherapist
