= Fort Worth Opera =

Opera company in Fort Worth, Texas, USA

- Formation: 1946; 80 years ago
- Type: Theatre group
- Location: Fort Worth, Texas, USA
- Website: fwopera.org

Fort Worth Opera is the oldest continually-performing opera company in the state of Texas and among the oldest in the United States, according to the company. While originally presenting operas one at a time over a fall/winter season, it changed to a "festival" format in 2007. In 2021, as the company celebrated its 75th anniversary season, Fort Worth Opera left the Festival format after fourteen years and returned to year-round programming.

== History ==
The Fort Worth Civic Opera Association, now known as Fort Worth Opera, was founded by three women, Eloise MacDonald Snyder and Betty Spain, both former opera singers, and pianist and composer Jeanne Axtell Walker. In seven months, the trio pulled together a full-scale production of Verdi's La Traviata, performed on November 25, 1946, in a building now known as the Cowtown Coliseum, located in the Fort Worth Stockyards. The new association went through several management changes before it hired Rudolf Kruger as the musical director in 1955. Under Kruger's guidance, Fort Worth Opera went on to become an arts company of note, especially during the 1960s, when it helped launch the careers of Plácido Domingo and Beverly Sills.

In 1982, the Fort Worth Opera executive board moved to reduce Kruger's responsibilities and began searching for a new managing director. The next several years proved to be difficult for the company, both financially and administratively. It hired and terminated two managing directors that were unable to generate the ticket sales and financial stability of Kruger. In 1991, Fort Worth Opera hired William Walker, a former singer with a distinguished career as one of Metropolitan Opera's principal baritones and as a recurring guest on The Tonight Show Starring Johnny Carson.

Under Walker's direction, the company was able to return to financial stability and artistic success. In 1998, the executive board, unhappy with Walker's administrative management and direction, offered him a severance package, which he initially accepted. Later at a meeting of the full board, his supporters rallied to overturn the executive committee's decision. The company lost many important board members and donors as a result. The remaining board hired an executive director to help with administrative issues and Walker retained his position until his retirement in June 2002.

In July 2001, Fort Worth Opera hired a new general director, Darren Keith Woods. Woods' prior experience included twenty years as a successful character tenor and general director of the Seagle Music Colony in upstate New York and Shreveport Opera. In recent years, the company has introduced more American and modern repertory to its programming, although it continues to produce mostly classical opera. On February 13, 2017, the Fort Worth Opera board of directors dismissed Woods from his post, citing differences over the future artistic and financial goals of the company.

Following the cancellation of the 2020 Festival due to the COVID-19 pandemic, Fort Worth Opera announced the launch of the FWO Green Room, a new digital initiative. As opera companies across the globe continue to explore innovative ways to connect with audiences and build dynamic relationships through technology, the organization offered a blend of entertaining and interactive online content for opera lovers. The FWO Green Room included a partnership with internationally renounced soprano Jennifer Rowley for a six-week Virtual Audition Intensive with young opera singers across the globe and the digital debut of the Fort Worth Opera Chorus with a performance of Moses Hogan's His Light Still Shines. In addition, the eighth installment of the company's innovative new works showcase, Frontiers: FWO Libretto Workshop, was presented virtually.

After a six-month international search in 2020, the Board of Trustees chose Afton Battle to become the company's eighth general director. The appointment of Ms. Battle, a native of Amarillo, marked a return to her home state of Texas, where she graduated from the University of Houston with a degree in Voice Performance, before attending Westminster Choir College in Princeton, New Jersey, and receiving a Master of Music in Voice Performance and Pedagogy. After creating out a career as an operatic singer, she became an Arts Administrator, Development Director and Consultant in the art, ballet, and theater worlds of Chicago and New York City, heading several corporate campaigns, before joining Fort Worth Opera in September of 2020 to lead the company.

During the company's 2020–2021 season, Fort Worth Opera launched FWO GO, an artistic initiative featuring socially distanced, pop-up performances in neighborhoods across the Dallas-Fort Worth Metroplex, Voices for Votes, a series of mini-concerts to entertain voters waiting in long lines to cast their ballot on Election Day, and A Night of Black Excellence, an all-star concert in celebration of Black History Month.

Each season, Fort Worth Opera hosts young professional singers-in-residence, the FWO Lesley Apprentice Artists. The Lesley Apprentice Artists gain training and experience, mostly through the company's Children's Opera Theatre and in small roles within season productions. This program and the FWO Studio Artist program bring opera to approximately 40,000 school children each year across the state of Texas, including those in low-income and low-performing schools. Fort Worth Opera also offers “Student Night at the Opera,” final dress rehearsals open to middle and high school students, and student rush discounts as part of its educational outreach.

== Change to festival format and a return to year-round programming ==
After 60 years of producing opera in the stagione style – one opera at a time over the fall and winter – Fort Worth Opera announced unprecedented change in February 2006: it would condense its entire schedule to an annual spring festival, with all of its operas and concerts being presented over a four-week period. The inaugural Fort Worth Opera Festival opened in May 2007 and featured the company's first main-stage world premiere, Frau Margot, by composer Thomas Pasatieri.

The scheduling of performances is similar to that of established opera festivals like the Santa Fe Opera, where operas are performed alternately, allowing visitors to see multiple works within a few days.

According to Scott Cantrell of the Dallas Morning News, "Fort Worth Opera has become one of the country's premier opera festivals." The company booked its second main-stage world premiere, Before Night Falls by Cuban-American composer Jorge Martín, based on the memoirs of Cuban poet and writer Reinaldo Arenas. Before Night Falls was featured in the company's 2010 Festival along with Don Giovanni and The Elixir of Love.

In 2021, Fort Worth Opera announced repertory, casting, and live performances for its landmark 75th anniversary season, including the world premiere of composer-librettist Héctor Armienta's Zorro. After 14 years of producing a nationally recognized Festival in the springtime, the organization returned to a year-round format during the 2021–2022 season, to expand its presence and visibility in the growing North Texas arts scene.

== See also ==
- List of opera festivals
