= Darren Keith Woods =

American opera singer

Darren Keith Woods (born 1958, Texas) is an American opera director and operatic tenor. A graduate of the Moores School of Music at the University of Houston, he began his career as an opera singer in 1982, making his professional debut at the Santa Fe Opera (SFO) as Don Curzio in Wolfgang Amadeus Mozart's Le nozze di Figaro. He spent most of his singing career portraying comprimario roles with opera companies throughout North America. Some of his performance credits include appearances with the Opera Theatre of Saint Louis, the Connecticut Grand Opera, Glimmerglass Opera, the Lyric Opera of Kansas City, and the Seattle Opera among others. He was a frequent performer at the SFO during the 1980s and 1990s.

Towards the end of his singing career, Woods became the Artistic Director of both the Shreveport Opera and the Seagle Music Colony in upstate New York. He retired from the stage in 2001, at which time he left his post in Shreveport to assume the position of General Director of the Fort Worth Opera until his firing on February 13, 2017. He also currently serves on the board of directors of OPERA America.

Woods has been married to wig and makeup designer Steven William Bryant since June 2012.
