= Farewell to the Sea =

1987 novel by Reinaldo Arenas

- Author: Reinaldo Arenas
- Original title: Otra vez el mar
- Translator: Andrew Hurley
- Language: Spanish
- Series: Pentagonia
- Genre: Novel
- Publisher: Argos-Vergara
- Publication date: 1982
- Publication place: Barcelona
- English publication date: 1987
- Media type: Print (Hardback & Paperback)
- Preceded by: Palace of the White Skunks
- Followed by: The Color of Summer

Farewell to the Sea (Spanish: Otra vez el mar) is a 1982 novel and the third in Cuban author Reinaldo Arenas's Pentagonia series, which critics have often argued as his best. It was published in English in New York in 1987.

Set on a Cuban beach immediately following the revolution, a disenchanted poet mourns for the new suppression while his wife longs for the connectivity that she can no longer find.
