= Lykke Aresin =

German physician and sexologist (1921–2011)

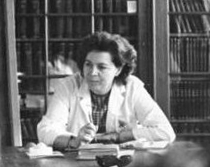
- Aresin in 1970
- Born: Lykke Bauer; 2 March 1921; Bernburg, Saxony-Anhalt, German Reich
- Died: 7 November 2011 (aged 90); Leipzig, Germany
- Burial place: Südfriedhof, Leipzig, Germany
- Education: University of Jena; University of Göttingen
- Employer(s): Medizinische Akademie Erfurt; Leipzig University Women's Clinic; International Planned Parenthood Federation (IPPF)
- Notable work: Sprechstunde des Vertrauens (1963)
- Spouse: Norbert Aresin (d. 1971)
- Children: 2

Lykke Aresin (née Bauer, 2 March 1921 – 7 November 2011) was a German physician, sexologist and writer. She worked as Chief of Staff at the Leipzig University Women's Clinic and published works on sex and marital counselling. She campaigned against Paragraph 151 of the Constitution of the German Democratic Republic (GDR), which banned "unnatural desire" between men, supported transgender people in receiving medical and legal care and advocated for free contraception for East German women.

== Family ==
Lykke Bauer was born on 2 March 1921 in Bernburg, Saxony-Anhalt, German Reich. Her father was Curt Bauer (1885–1968) and her mother was Olga Bauer (née Bachmann, 1889–1963). Her family were of Danish descent. Bauer married German physician Norbert Aresin (1911–1971) [de].

== Career ==
Aresin studied medicine at the University of Jena and the University of Göttingen. She began her career as a specialist in neurology and psychiatry and a physician at the Medizinische Akademie Erfurt [de].

When her husband was appointed as Director of the Leipzig University Women's Clinic in 1959, Aresin worked with him as a senior physician specialising in psychosomatic and sexual disorders in women and studying ovulation. By 1965, Aresin was Chief of Staff of the clinic. The "Weimar-style" sexology clinic was popular for its role in providing oral contraception and treatment of sexual dysfunction, with visitors recorded from across the German Democratic Republic (GDR). In 1996, with her colleague Siegfried Schnabl, Aresin pushed for 252 marital and sexual counselling centres to be established across the country.

Aresin contributed to over 200 scientific publications in her career. Her 1963 book Sprechstunde des Vertrauens (Consultation Hour of Trust) explored marital counselling and giving matter of fact advice about sex and preventing sexually transmitted diseases. It also emphasised the imperative of professional confidentiality, including if "abnormal sexual proclivities" (meaning homosexuality) were disclosed.

Aresin wrote an article for judicial officials about the medical causes of marital conflicts, where she praised the work of the American sexologists Alfred Kinsey, William Masters and Virginia Johnson. She attributed the decline of marriage and the family in East Germany as a symptom of capitalism or a lack of love between partners.

In the 1970s, Aresin published two youth encyclopaedias: Junge Ehe (Young Marriage) and Jugend Zu Zweit (Youth in Two), due to a "commitment to popular education." She gave guest lectures in Cuba, for the World Health Organization (WHO), and participated in conferences in Europe, Africa, Latin America, and Japan for the International Planned Parenthood Federation (IPPF). She was the IPPF's link to Eastern Europe.

Aresin was an advocate of free contraception and abortions, campaigning for the birth control pill to be available to East German women. She did not support the full legalisation of abortion, supporting the 1972 laws which abolished illegal abortions and their associated medical dangers for women.

In the 1980s, Aresin campaigned against Paragraph 151 of the Constitution of the German Democratic Republic, the "gay paragraph," which banned "unnatural desire" between men. The paragraph was overturned earlier in East Germany than in West Germany. Aresin was a convenor of the 1985 conference on "The Psycho-Social Aspects of Homosexuality." She also advocated for transgender people to receive medical and legal care.

In 1990, Aresin was co-founder of the organisation Pro Familia Saxony, which she chaired until 1998. She was a founding member of the Marriage and Family Section of the Society for Hygiene. In 1996, she published Lexikon der Erotik with Kurt Starke.

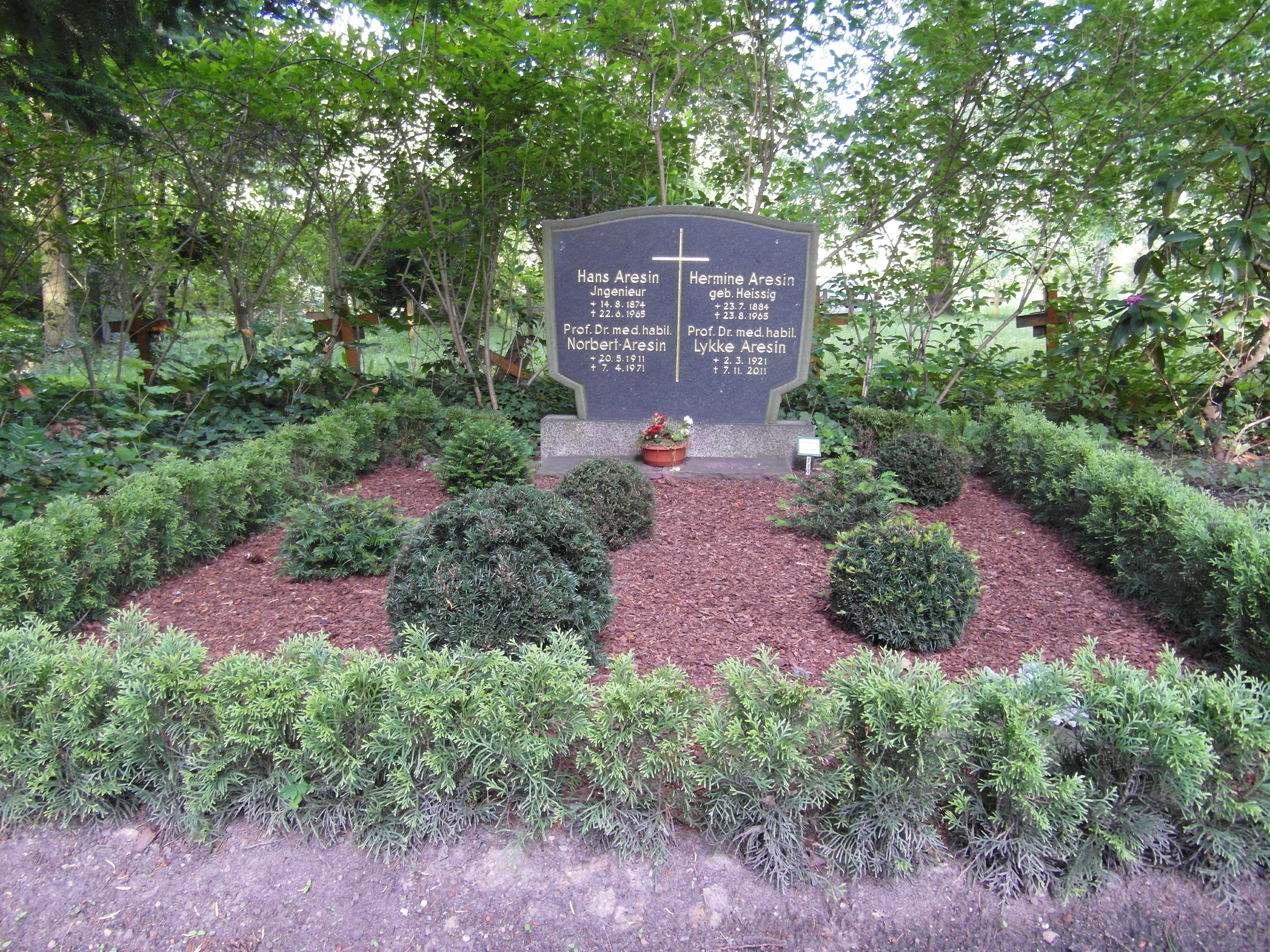
The graves of Aresen and her husband at Südfriedhof in Leipzig

== Death ==
Aresin died on 7 November 2011 in Leipzig, Saxony, aged 90. She was buried at Südfriedhof in Leipzig.

== Select publications ==
- Sprechstunde des Vertrauens (Consultation Hour of Trust), 1963
- Junge Ehe (Young Marriage)
- Jugend Zu Zweit (Youth in Two)
- Volk und Gesundheit (Sexual Medicine), 1983
- Lexikon für Humansexuologie (Lexicon for Human Sexuality), 1990
- Lexikon der Erotik (Lexicon of Eroticism), with Kurt Starke, 1996

== Legacy ==
In 2021, a commemorative plaque in Aresin's honour was unveiled in Leipzig.
