= Limbach Municipal Church =

Church in Limbach-Oberfrohna, Germany

Coordinates: 50°51′29″N 12°46′01″E

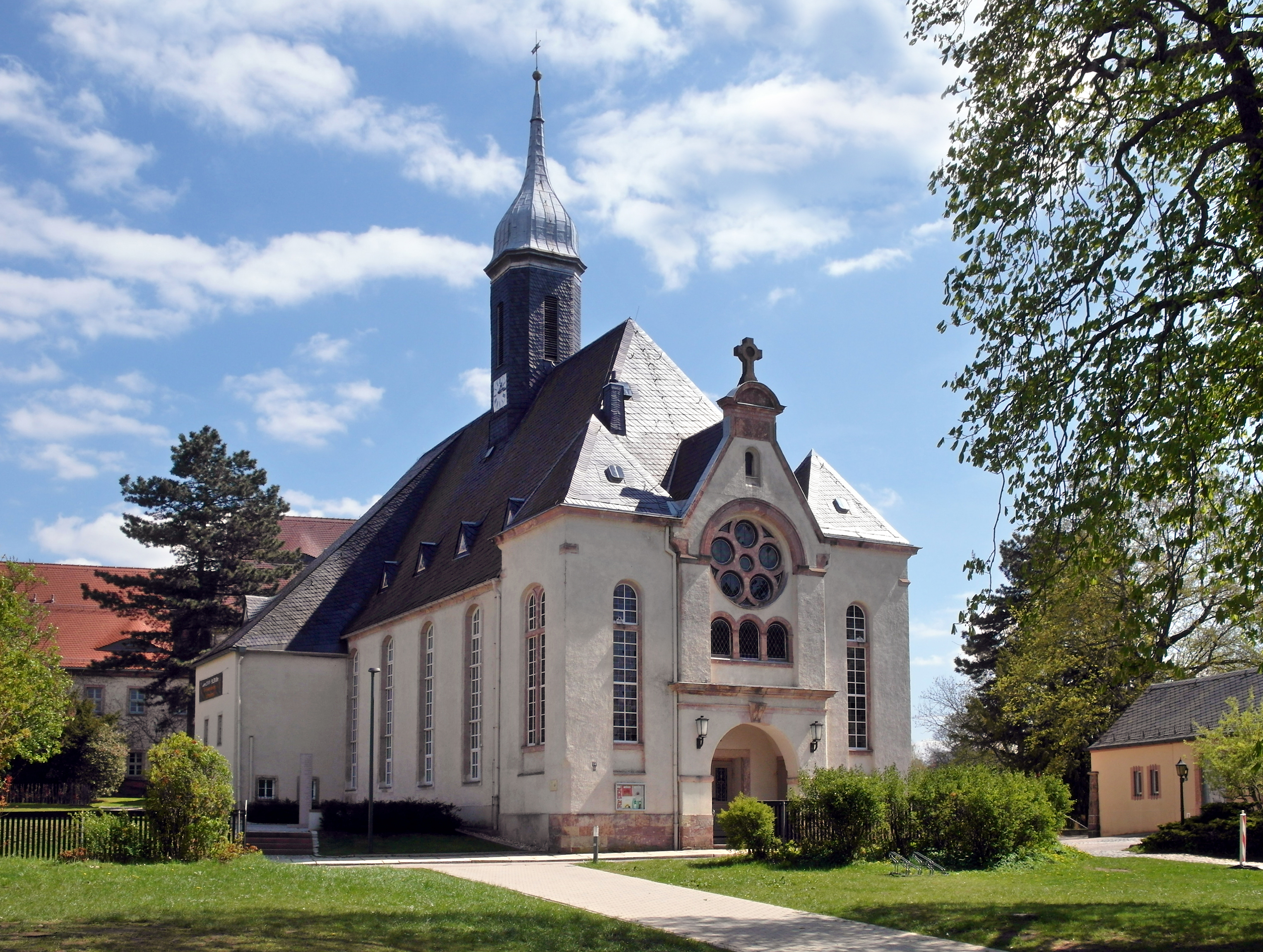
Limbach Municipal Church in 2017

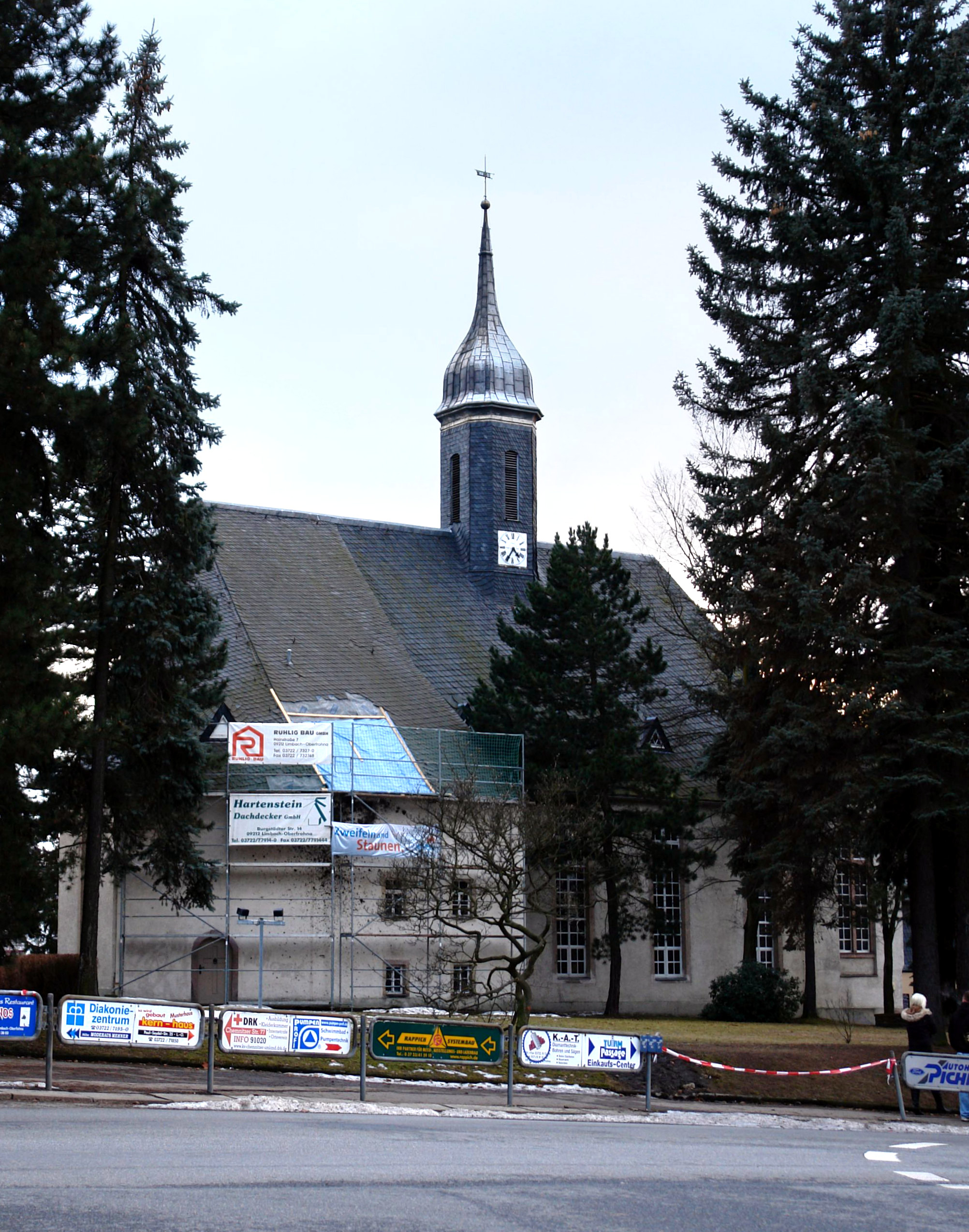
Damaged church in 2009

Limbach Municipal Church is a church in Limbach-Oberfrohna in Saxony (Germany), which was built in the 16th century. In 1811 it was transformed into a municipal church and in 1894 it was enlarged. In 1899 its tower was renewed after the old one was destroyed by lightning. It has a height of 29 metres.

On January 25, 2009, a speeding car crashed into the roof of the church, whereby the driver was severely hurt. The police reported that the car skipped thirty meters of ground and hit the church in a height of seven meters.
