= Siegfried Schnabl =

German sexologist and psychotherapist

Siegfried Schnabl (27 February 1927 – 4 August 2015) was a German sexologist and psychotherapist who contributed to the work of sex education in East Germany and other nations.

== Biography ==
Schnabl was born in Limbach, Sachsen. He worked as a sexologist and psychotherapist and pushed for 252 marital and sexual counselling centres to be established across the country with his colleague Lykke Aresin.

== Works ==
- Untersuchungen typologischer und allgemeiner Besonderheiten der höheren Nerventätigkeit des Menschen mit einer Komplexmethode. (English: Studies and general typological characteristics of higher nervous activity of man with a complex method) Dissertation, University of Leipzig, 1955
- Einführung in die Psychopathologie. (English: Introduction to Psychopathology) Potsdam: Institut für Weiterbildung Mittlerer Medizinischer Fachkräfte 1967 (Lesson)
- Mann und Frau intim. Fragen des gesunden und des gestörten Geschlechtslebens. (English: Man and Woman, Intimately: Issues of Healthy and Unhealthy Sex Life) Rudolstadt: Greifenverlag, 1 August 1969 (with illustrations by Helmut Fliege)
  18 August 1990 ISBN 3-333-00471-2
  - Mann und Frau intim. Gesundes Geschlechtsleben, gestörtes Geschlechtsleben. (English: Man and Woman, Intimately: Healthy Sex Life and Unhealthy Sex Life) (slightly abridged edition license for the Federal Republic of Germany) Gütersloh: Bertelsmann guide publication, 1 August 1969 (with illustrations by Horst and Gisela Keuer. Sex Positions: Horst Günther)
  - Muž a žena intímne. Otázky zdravého a narušeného pohlavného života. (English: Man and Woman, Intimately: Issues of Healthy and Unhealthy Sex Life) Martin: Publishing house Osveta, 1 August 1972 (Slovak)
  - Мъжаът и жената интимно. Проблеми на нормалния и смутения полов живот. (English: Man and Woman, Intimately: Issues of Healthy and Unhealthy Sex Life) Sofia: Medicine and Sports (Медицина и Физкултура), 1 August 1979 (Bulgarian)
  - El hombre y la mujer en la intimidad. (English: Man and Woman, Intimately) Havanna: Editorial Científico-Técnica, 1979 (Spanish)
  - Мужчина и женщина: интимные отношения. (English: Man and Woman: Intimate relationships) Kischinjow: Publishing house Stiinca (Стиинца) 1982 (Russian)
  - O homem e a mulher na intimidade. Questões da vida sexual. (English: Man and Woman, Intimately: Issues of Sex Life) Lissabon: Editorial Caminho, 1983 (Portuguese)
  - Seksologijos pagrindai. (English: Basic Sexology) Vilnius: Science 1990 (Lithuanian) ISBN 5-420-00321-X
  - Die Lust des Liebens. Frau und Mann intim. (English: The Joy of Love: Man and Woman, Intimately) Frankfurt am Main: published by Ullstein Verlag in paperback, 1992, (completely revised and enlarged edition) ISBN 3-548-34932-3
  - Barbatul şi femeia. Relaţii intime. (English: Men and Women: Intimate Relationships) Chișinău: EUS 1993 (Romanian) ISBN 5-88568-042-6
- Intimverhalten, Sexualstörungen, Persönlichkeit. (English: Intimate Behavior, Sexual Disorders, Personality.) Habilitation, University of Leipzig, 1972, (As a book) Berlin, Publicly Owned Operation German Academic Publishers, 1972
  - Comportamento sessuale e personalità. (English: Sexual Behavior and Personality) Milan: Teti (circa 1976) (Italian)
- Nervös? Ursachen, Erscheinungsformen, Vorbeugen u. Überwindung psychosozialer Gesundheitsstörungen. (English: Are you Nervous? Causes, Symptoms, Prevention and Overcoming of Psychosocial Health Problems) Berlin, Volkseigener Betrieb, published in People and Health, 1 August 1975
  - Нервен ли сте? (English: Are you Nervous?) Sofia: Medicine and Sports (Медицина и Физкултура), 1 August 1984 (Bulgarian)
  - Nervioso? (English: Are you Nervous?) Havanna: Editorial Científico-Técnica, 1985 (Spanish)
- Plädoyer für die Liebe. (English: Plea for Love) Leipzig/Jena/Berlin: Urania-Verlag, 2 August 1978
  - Разговор за любовта. (English: Talking about Love) Sofia: Medicine and Sports (Медицина и Физкултура), 1 August 1982 (Bulgarian)
  - En defensa del amor. (English: In Defense of Love) Havanna: Editorial Científico-Técnica, 2 August 1985 (Spanish)
- Der Liebe Lust, der Liebe Leid. (English: The Joy of Love, The Pain of Love) Berlin: Berliner Verlag 1987 ISBN 3-86020-007-0
- 100 Fragen zu Sex und Liebe. (English: 100 Questions about Sex and Love) Frankfurt am Main: published by Ullstein Verlag in paperback, 1994 ISBN 3-548-35341-X
