= The Palace of the White Skunks =

1982 novel by Reinaldo Arenas Fuentes

THe Palace of the White Skunks
- 1991 edition
- Author: Reinaldo Arenas
- Original title: El palacio de las blanquísimas mofetas
- Translator: Andrew Hurley
- Language: Spanish
- Genre: Novel
- Publisher: Editorial Argos Vergara
- Publication date: 1982
- Publication place: Spain
- English publication date: 1990

The Palace of the White Skunks (Spanish: El palacio de las blanquísimas mofetas), published in 1982, is the second book of Cuban author Reinaldo Arenas's Pentagonia book series.

== Plot summary ==
The main character, Fortunato, wants to escape the throes of his sisters and parents by joining the revolutionaries vying to overthrow Batista's regime.

Arenas seamlessly weaves in and out of the domestic voices that scream of the emotion and convention that young Fortunato wants to escape. Despite his courageous efforts, death remains outside in the backyard rolling the wheel of his bicycle.

== Critical reception ==
Kirkus Reviews described the novel as: "Often lyrical, and rich in imagery and insight, but nonetheless overloaded with dream sequences, literary games (there is a short play included at the end), and messages, the same ones frequently repeated. The horror is all but lost--which is too bad."
