= Reinaldo Arenas =

Cuban writer (1943–1990)

- Born: Reinaldo Arenas Fuentes; July 16, 1943; Aguas Claras, Holguín Province, Cuba
- Died: December 7, 1990 (aged 47); Hell's Kitchen, New York, United States
- Occupation: Writer
- Writing career
- Period: 1966–1990
- Genres: poetry, novel, drama
- Notable works: Pentagonia; Before Night Falls

Reinaldo Arenas (July 16, 1943 – December 7, 1990) was a Cuban poet, novelist, and playwright who is known as a vocal critic of Fidel Castro, the Cuban Revolution, and the Cuban government. His memoir of the Cuban dissident movement and of being a political prisoner, Before Night Falls, was dictated after his escape to the United States during the 1980 Mariel boatlift and published posthumously. Arenas, who was dying of AIDS, killed himself in 1990.

== Life ==
Arenas was born in the countryside of Newport Beach, Aguas Claras, Holguín Province, Cuba, and later moved to the city of Holguín as a teenager. He was six years old when he started school, attending Rural School 91 in Perronales County. Around this age, he discovered that he was gay. He later wrote about his sexual exploration with himself. He talked openly of having his first experience of straight sex, though incomplete, with his cousin, Dulce Maria. He also shared that his first act of gay sex was at age eight with his cousin Orlando, who was 12. Arenas stated, "In the country, sexual energy generally overcomes all prejudice, repression, and punishment.... Physical desire overpowers whatever feelings of machismo our fathers take upon themselves to instill in us."

After moving to Holguín when he was a teen, Arenas got a job at a guava paste factory. When conditions in the city started to get worse, around 1958, he decided that he wanted to join the guerillas (Castro and his movement). When he was 14, he walked to Velasco, where he met Cuco Sánchez, who took him to the pro-Soviet Cuban guerrilla headquarters in the Sierra Gibara. A guerilla commander, Eddy Suñol, interviewed Arenas and said, "We have plenty of guerrillas; what we need is weapons."

After ten days with the guerilla, Arenas went back to Holguín with the intention of killing a guard and taking his weapon. When he made it back to the city, he went home to see his grandparents who were not so happy to see him. Because he made the mistake of leaving a note saying that he was going to join the guerillas, the women who lived with his grandparents spread the news like wildfire. Fulgencio Batista's secret police, the Bureau for the Repression of Communist Activities, were on the lookout for him. His brief trip home made him realize that he could not stay and so he trekked back to Velasco to the rebel encampment. It now had to accept him.

When he was 16, he was awarded a scholarship at La Pantoja, the Batista military camp that had been converted into a polytechnic institute. There, one of the most important courses was on Marxist–Leninism. Students had to master Manual of the Soviet Academy of Sciences, Manual of Political Economy by Pyotr Ivanovich Nikitin, and Foundations of Socialism in Cuba by Blas Roca Calderio. Arenas graduated as an agricultural accountant but later described his schooling as "communist indoctrination."

The first time that Arenas was in Havana was in 1960. He returned later when he enrolled in a planning course at the University of Havana and reported to the Hotel Nacional de Cuba. While in the program, he worked for the National Institute for Agrarian Reform. It was not until around 1963 that Arenas started to live his life as a gay man, but even then, it was still a life in extreme secrecy. He feared ending up in one of the Military Units to Aid Production, which were concentration camps for LGBT people, Christians, and suspected members of the Cuban dissident movement. A relationship with a man named Miguel, who was later arrested and taken to a UMAP camp, was the beginning of Arenas' life of being known as a gay man by the Cuban Committees for the Defense of the Revolution.

Throughout his life, Arenas became friends with and had relationships with many gay men. He went so far as to say that at one point, he had had sex with at least 5,000 men. He watched as various friends and acquaintances pledged their allegiance to the regime in exchange for safety. They became informers for the government and reported other men, often former friends or relations. The intention was to find gay and bisexual men and either prosecute and jail them or turn them into other informers. As a reward for co-operating with the regime, their lives were spared. Those who became informers, however, often had to participate in humiliating public acts of repudiation that publicly denounced their anti-regime beliefs or their homosexuality.

Arenas watched that happen with Herberto Padilla, who had written a book that was critical of the Cuban Revolution to an official competition. Padilla was arrested in 1971, and after 30 days in a cell, he decided to speak. Various Cuban intellectuals were invited by the state security to hear what he had to say. Padilla stood in front of everyone and apologized for everything that he had done. He painted himself as a coward and a traitor, apologized for his previous work, and threw blame on himself. He publicly denounced his friends and his wife and said that they had counterrevolutionary attitudes. Those whom he named were forced to go to the microphone, accept blame for their actions, and say that they were traitors as well.

In 1963, he moved to Havana to enroll in the School of Planification and later in the Faculty of Letters at the Universidad de La Habana, where he studied philosophy and literature without completing a degree. The following year, he began working at the National Library José Martí. During his time working for the National Institute for Agrarian Reform, he spent much time at the National Library. After writing a short story and presenting it to a committee, he received a telegram that it was interested in talking to him. When he went, he met María Teresa Freye de Andrade, the director of the National Library. She orchestrated Arenas' move from the institute to the library. He then became employed there. It was around then that his talent was noticed, and he received a literary award for his novel, Singing from the Well, at the Cirilo Villaverde National Competition, which was held by the National Union of Writers and Artists of Cuba (UNEAC).

His El mundo alucinante (This Hallucinatory World, published in the US as The Ill-Fated Peregrinations of Fray Servando) was also awarded "first Honorable Mention" by the UNEAC in 1966. The jury, consisting of Virgilio Piñera, Alejo Carpentier, José Antonio Portuondo and Félix Pita Rodríguez, could find no better novel to merit the prize, and since they refused to award it to Arenas, no First Prize was awarded that year. His writings and openly gay life were by that time bringing him into conflict with the communist government. Piñera, who was an openly gay writer himself and a passionate anti-communist, revealed to Arenas that Alejo Carpentier and José Antonio Portuondo had deprived him of first prize, using their influece to have the prize given to Vivir en Candonga by Ezequiel Vieta, a book that sympathized with Fidel Castro's struggle in the Sierra Maestra, and that denounced escapist literature and writers as a whole. Arenas left the library and became an editor for the Cuban Book Institute until 1968. From 1968 to 1974, he was a journalist and editor for the literary magazine La Gaceta de Cuba.

In 1974, he was sent to prison after being charged and convicted of "ideological deviation" and for publishing abroad without official consent. He escaped the prison and tried to leave Cuba by launching himself from the shore on a tire inner tube, but he was rearrested near Lenin Park and imprisoned at the notorious El Morro Castle alongside murderers and rapists. He survived by helping the inmates to write letters to wives and lovers. He collected enough paper that way to continue his writing. However, his attempts to smuggle his work out of prison were discovered, and he was severely punished. Threatened with death, he was forced to renounce his work and was released in 1976.

In 1980, as part of the Mariel Boatlift, he fled to the United States. He came on the San Lázaro, a boat captained by the Cuban émigré Roberto Agüero.

== Death ==
In 1987, Arenas was diagnosed with AIDS but continued to write and speak out against the Cuban government. He mentored many Cuban exile writers, including John O'Donnell-Rosales. Arenas died by suicide on December 7, 1990, in New York City.

In 2012, Arenas was inducted into the Legacy Walk, an outdoor public display that celebrates LGBT history and people.

== Writings ==
Despite his short life and the hardships that were imposed during his imprisonment, Arenas produced a significant body of work. In addition to significant poetic efforts ("El Central", "Leprosorio"), his Pentagonia is a set of five novels that comprise a "secret history" of post-revolutionary Cuba. It includes Singing from the Well (in Spanish also titled "Celestino before Dawn"), Farewell to the Sea (whose literal translation is "The Sea Once More"), Palace of the White Skunks, Color of Summer, and The Assault. In those novels, his style ranges from a stark realist narrative and high modernist experimental prose to absurdist satiric humor. His second novel, Hallucinations ("El Mundo Alucinante"), rewrites the story of the colonial dissident priest Fray Servando Teresa de Mier.

In interviews, his autobiography, and some of his fiction work, Arenas draws explicit connections between his own life experience and the identities and fates of his protagonists. As is evident and as critics such as Francisco Soto have pointed out, the "child narrator" in "Celestino," Fortunato in "The Palace...," Hector in "Farewell..," and the triply named "Gabriel/Reinaldo/Gloomy Skunk" character in "Color" appear to live progressive stages of a continuous life story that is also linked to Arenas's.

In turn, Arenas consistently links his individual narrated life to the historical experience of a generation of Cubans. A constant theme in his novels and other writing is the condemnation of the Castro government, but Arenas also critiques the Catholic Church and American culture and politics. He also critiques a series of literary personalities in Havana and internationally, particularly those who he believed had betrayed him and suppressed his work (Severo Sarduy and Ángel Rama are notable examples). His "Thirty truculent Tongue-Twisters," which he claimed to have circulated in Havana and were reprinted in "The Color of Summer," mock everyone from personal friends, who he suggests may have spied on him, to figures such as Nicolás Guillén, Alejo Carpentier, Miguel Barnet, Sarduy, and Castro himself.

His autobiography Before Night Falls was on the New York Times list of the ten best books of the year in 1993. In 2000, the work was made into a film, directed by Julian Schnabel in which Arenas was played by Javier Bardem. An opera based on the autobiography with libretto and music by the Cuban-American composer Jorge Martín premiered at the Fort Worth Opera on May 29, 2010, with baritone Wes Mason singing the role of Arenas.

The Reinaldo Arenas Papers are held at Princeton University Library. "The collection consists of personal and working papers of Reinaldo Arenas" and includes typescript and typescript drafts, essays, interviews, newspaper clippings, correspondence, and other documents.

== Notable works ==
- El mundo alucinante (1966) ISBN 978-84-8310-775-1, OCLC 421023; Scholarly edition by Enrico Mario Santí; English translation Hallucinations (2001 reissue) ISBN 978-0-14-200019-9.
- Cantando en el pozo (1982) (originally published as Celestino antes del alba (1967)) English translation Singing from the Well (1987) ISBN 978-0-14-009444-2.
- El palacio de las blanquisimas mofetas (1982) English translation The Palace of the White Skunks (1990) ISBN 978-0-14-009792-4.
- Otra vez el mar (1982) English translation Farewell to the Sea (1987) ISBN 978-0-14-006636-4.
- El color del verano (1982) English translation The Color of Summer (1990) ISBN 978-0-14-015719-2.
- El Asalto (1990) English translation The Assault (1992) ISBN 978-0-14-015718-5.
- El portero (1987) English translation The Doorman (1991) ISBN 978-0-8021-3405-9.
- Antes que anochezca (1992) English translation Before Night Falls (1993) ISBN 978-0-14-015765-9.
- Mona and Other Tales (2001) ISBN 978-0-375-72730-6 This is an English translation of a collection of short stories originally published in Spanish in Spain between 1995 and 2001
- Con los ojos cerrados (1972).
- La vieja Rosa (1980), English Translation Old Rosa (1989) ISBN 978-0-8021-3406-6.
- El central (1981), ISBN 978-0-380-86934-3.
- Termina el desfile (1981).
- Arturo, la estrella más brillante (1984).
- Cinco obras de teatro bajo el título Persecución (1986).
- Necesidad de libertad (1986).
- La Loma del Angel (1987), English Translation Graveyard of the Angels (1987) ISBN 978-0-380-75075-7.
- Voluntad de vivir manifestándose (1989) ISBN 978-987-9396-55-1.
- Viaje a La Habana (1990). ISBN 978-0-89729-544-4.
- Final de un cuento (El Fantasma de la glorieta) (1991) ISBN 978-84-86842-38-3.
- Adiós a mamá (1996) ISBN 978-0-89729-791-2

== See also ==
- American literature in Spanish
- Cuban American literature
- Cuban dissident movement
- List of famous Cuban-Americans
- List of Cuban American writers
- LGBT rights in Cuba
