= Jorge Martín (composer) =

American composer (born 1959)

Jorge Martín (born 1959) is an American composer.

== Early life and studies ==
Jorge Martín was born in Santiago de Cuba, Cuba, and established his residence in the United States at an early age. He studied at Yale University and at Columbia University, where he earned a Master of Music and a Doctor of Music in composition.

== Work ==
His opera Before Night Falls, based on the 1992 autobiography of the same name by Cuban writer Reinaldo Arenas, was given its world premiere at the Fort Worth Opera in June 2010. The Fort Worth Opera released a recording of the opera on Albany Records. Albany also released another recording of Martin's compositions entitled Cello Music in 2012.

Other compositions include "Beast and Superbeast", a set of four one-act operas based on short stories by Saki; a Saxophone Quartet and Four Dances for Bassoon and String Quartet, which had its world premiere in Finland in July 1997.

== Awards ==
In 2005, Martín received a fellowship award from the Bogliasco Foundation in Genoa. He is also the recipient of an American Academy of Arts and Letters' Academy Award in Music, an ASCAP Standard Music Award, an artist's residency at Yaddo in Saratoga Springs in 1993, Cintas for music in 1999 and a CINTAS Foundation "Brandon Fradd Fellowship in music composition" in 2011.

His one-act opera Tobermory won first prize in 1993 in the National Opera Association's Fifth Biennial Chamber Opera Competition and has been performed in several cities in the United States.
