= National Center for Sex Education =

Cuban government-funded body

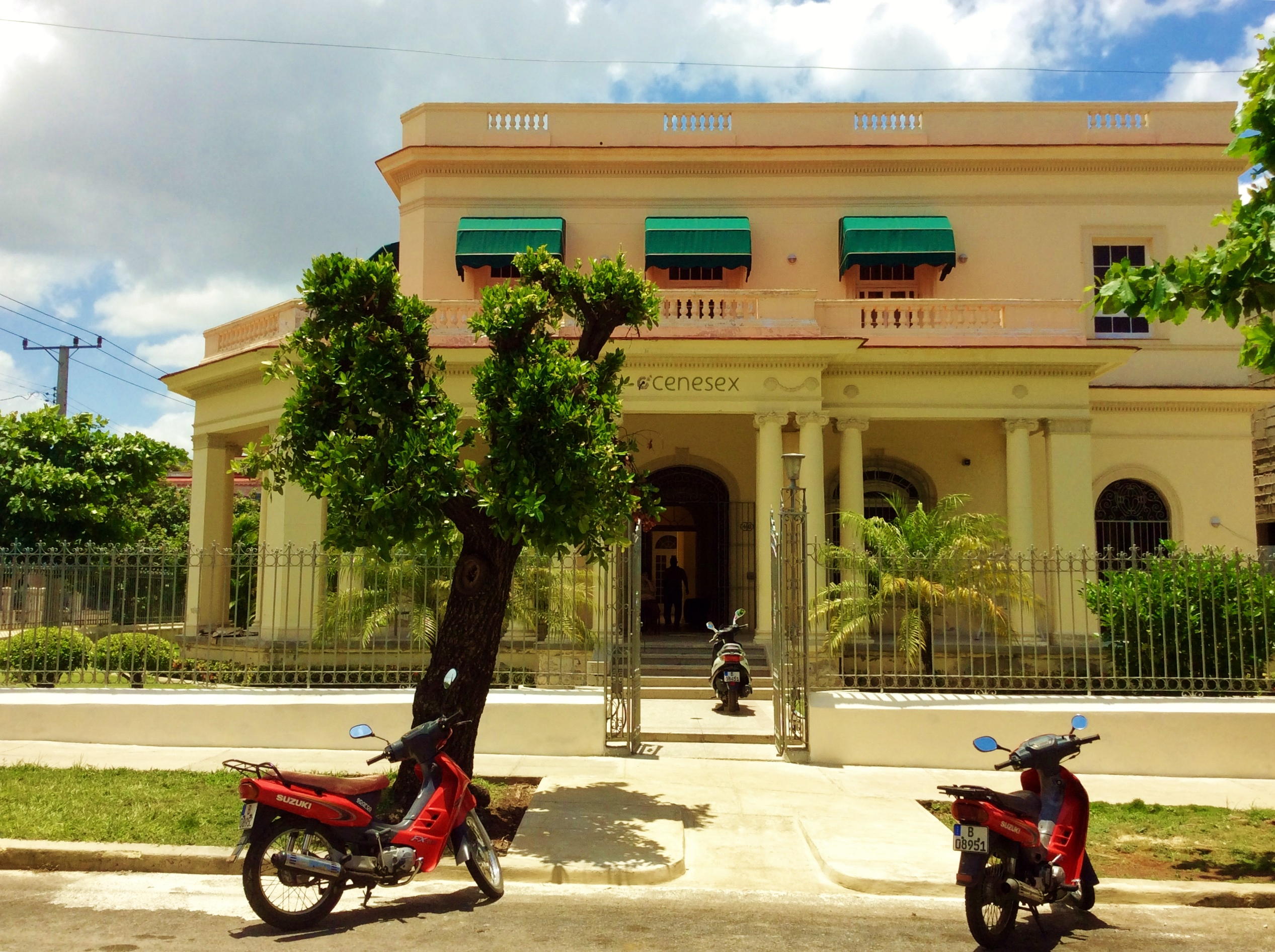
Headquarters of CENESEX

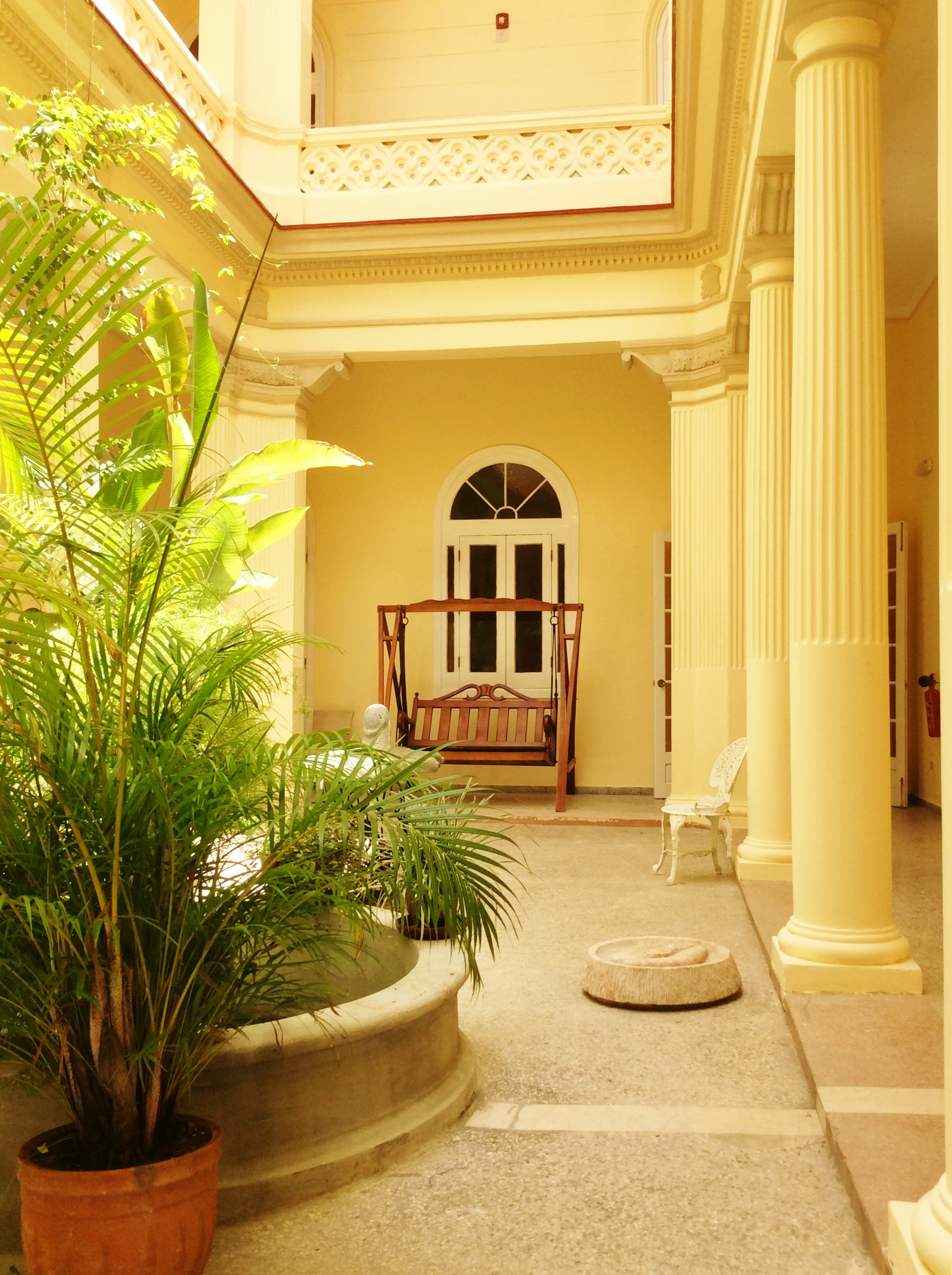
Interior of CENESEX

The National Center for Sex Education (Spanish: Centro Nacional de Educación Sexual, CENESEX) is a government-funded body founded in 1989 in Cuba. The center is best known for advocating tolerance of LGBT issues on the island. CENESEX stresses acceptance of sexual diversity and has attracted international attention in recent years for its campaigns for the rights of transgender persons, including the recognition of an individual’s gender identity, regardless of birth sex, and provision of state-funded sexual reassignment surgery. The head of the center is Mariela Castro, daughter of the Cuban politician and former president of the Federation of Cuban Women, Vilma Espín, and the former Cuban leader Raúl Castro (himself brother of longtime former leader Fidel Castro).

== History ==
Since the Cuban revolution there have been different national sex education programs coordinated by the Federation of Cuban Women and the Ministry of Public Health of Cuba. In 1972, the National Sex Education Working Group (Spanish: Grupo Nacional de Trabajo de Educación Sexual) was founded as its own entity to develop and coordinate these types of activities in Cuban institutions and society. From 1977 it also acquired the tasks of training sexual therapists and educators, specialized care for transsexual people and advice and therapy for sexual dysfunctions. In 1989, the National Center for Sexual Education was founded as the successor to the aforementioned Working Group, intensifying its work in research and the training of qualified professionals in the area of sexuality.

== Mission ==
CENESEX’s mission is to contribute to “the development of a culture of sexuality that is full, pleasurable and responsible, as well as to promote the full exercise of sexual rights.” The center plays a primary role in education concerning contraception and AIDS.

== State-funded sexual reassignment ==
The center pushed for passage of a law that would provide transgender persons with free sex reassignment surgery and hormone replacement therapy in addition to granting them new legal identification documents with their changed gender. A draft bill was presented to the Cuban parliament in 2005. Prior to being approved, it was suggested that the bill would make Cuba the most progressive nation in Latin America on gender issues. The measure passed in June 2008.

== See also ==
- LGBT rights in Cuba
- Education in Cuba
- Healthcare in Cuba
