= Before Night Falls =

1992 autobiography of Cuban writer Reinaldo Arenas

- Author: Reinaldo Arenas
- Original title: Antes que anochezca: autobiografía
- Translator: Dolores M. Koch
- Language: Spanish
- Genre: Autobiography
- Publisher: Tusquets Editores (original); Viking Press (English translation
- Publication date: 1992
- Publication place: Cuba
- English publication date: 1993
- Media type: Print
- Pages: 317 pp
- ISBN: 978-0-670-84078-6

Before Night Falls (Spanish: Antes que anochezca: autobiografía) is the 1992 autobiography of Cuban writer Reinaldo Arenas, describing his early life in Cuba, the Cuban dissident movement and his political imprisonment, as well as his escape to the United States in the Mariel boatlift of 1980. It received a favorable review from The New York Times and was on the newspaper's list of the ten best books of 1993. The book was adapted into a 2000 film of the same name starring Javier Bardem as Arenas.

== Opera adaptation ==
On May 29, 2010, the premiere performance of Before Night Falls, an opera by Jorge Martín, took place at the Fort Worth Opera. The opera follows the book by Reinaldo Arenas closely.

On March 29, 2017, Florida Grand Opera premiered Before Night Falls in Miami with five performances at the Adrienne Arsht Center for the Performing Arts.
