= Tomoka Correctional Institution =

Prison in Florida, United States

Coordinates: 29°09′06″N 81°09′36″W

- Interactive map of Tomoka Correctional Institution
- Location: 3950 Tiger Bay Road Daytona Beach, Florida
- Status: mixed
- Capacity: 1263
- Opened: 1981
- Managed by: Florida Department of Corrections

The Tomoka Correctional Institution is an American state prison for men located in Daytona Beach, Volusia County, Florida, owned and operated by the Florida Department of Corrections. With a mix of security levels including minimum, medium, and close, this facility was opened in 1981 and has a maximum capacity of 1263 prisoners.

Tomoka correctional officer Donna Fitzgerald was stabbed to death by an inmate in June 2008. An investigation by the DOC's inspector general officially blamed the warden and officials for "critical security breaches, gross neglect of duty, and ineptitude."

In 2014 eight Tomoka inmates died in custody, more than any other Florida (non-hospital) state prison. Although some of those deaths were unexplained, the FDLE declined to release any information.

== Notable Inmates ==
Inmate Name	Register Number	Status	Details
Bernard Giles	058341	Serving a life sentence.	Convicted of murdering 5 people.
Francisco del Junco	442687	Serving 4 life sentences.	Murdered 4 people and then burned their bodies.
