= Mariel boatlift =

Mass migration of Cubans to the US in 1980

- Part of the Cuban exodus
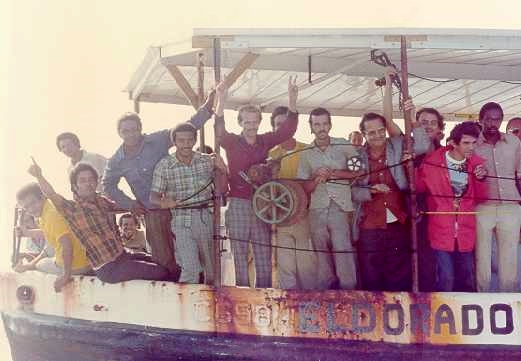
- Cuban refugees arriving in crowded boats during the Mariel boatlift crisis in 1980
- Date: April 15 – October 31, 1980 (6 months, 2 weeks and 2 days)
- Also known as: Exodo del Mariel (English: Mariel exodus)
- Participants: Government of Costa Rica; Government of Cuba; Government of Peru; Government of United States; People from Cuba; People from Haiti
- Outcome: Around 125,000 Cubans and 25,000 Haitians arrive in the United States.

The Mariel boatlift (Spanish: éxodo del Mariel) was a mass emigration of Cubans who traveled from Cuba's Mariel Harbor to the United States between April 15 and October 31, 1980. The term "Marielito" is used to refer to these refugees in both Spanish and English. While the exodus was triggered by a sharp downturn in the Cuban economy, it followed on the heels of generations of Cubans who had immigrated to the United States in the preceding decades.

After 10,000 Cubans tried to gain asylum by taking refuge on the grounds of the Peruvian embassy, the Cuban government announced that anyone who wanted to leave could do so. The ensuing mass migration was organized by Cuban Americans, with the agreement of Cuban president Fidel Castro. The Cuban government considered the exodus a sort of social cleansing of the nations' so-called undesirables and organized acts of repudiation against prospective emigrants.

The arrival of the refugees in the United States created political problems for U.S. president Jimmy Carter. The Carter administration struggled to develop a consistent response to the immigrants. The Mariel boatlift was ended by mutual agreement between the two governments in late October 1980. By then, an estimated 125,000 Cubans had reached Florida.

== Background ==
=== Cuba–United States relations ===
In the late 1970s, U.S. president Jimmy Carter sought to improve relations with Cuba. He lifted all restrictions on travel to Cuba, and in September 1977, both countries established an Interests Section in each other's capital. However, relations were still strained because Cuba supported the Soviet Union's military interventions in Africa and the Middle East with their own. The two countries struggled to reach agreement on a relaxation of the US embargo on trade to permit the export of a select list of medicines to Cuba without provoking Carter's political opponents in the US Congress.

Ten members of Congress visited Cuba in December 1978, and the Cuban government later released Frank C. Emmick, the US manager of a business in Cuba who had been prevented from leaving in 1963, accused of being a CIA agent, and sentenced to 50 years in prison. A group of 55 people whose parents brought them from Cuba returned for three weeks in December 1978 in a rare instance of Cuba allowing the return of Cuban-born émigrés. In December 1978, both countries agreed upon their maritime border, and the next month, they were working on an agreement to improve their communications in the Straits of Florida. The US responded to Cuban relaxation of restrictions on emigration by allowing Cuban-Americans to send up to $500 to an emigrating relative (equal to $2,400 in 2023).

In November 1978, Castro's government met in Havana with a group of Cubans living in exile, agreed to grant an amnesty to 3,600 political prisoners, and announced that they would be freed in the course of the next year and allowed to leave Cuba.

Caribbean Holidays began offering one-week trips to Cuba in January 1978 in co-operation with Cubatur, the official Cuban travel agency. By May 1979, tours were being organized for Americans to participate in the Cuban Festival of Arts (Carifesta) in July, with flights departing from Tampa, Mexico City, and Montreal.

=== Haitian immigration to the United States ===
Before 1980, many Haitian immigrants arrived on American shores by boat. They were not granted legal protection because they were considered economic migrants, rather than political refugees, despite claims made by many Haitians that they were being persecuted by the Duvalier regime. U.S. presidents Richard Nixon and Gerald Ford denied claims of asylum in the United States for Haitian migrants by boat. A backlash by the Congressional Black Caucus ensued, which claimed that the U.S. government was discriminating against Haitian immigrants.

== Prelude ==
=== Rush to embassies in Cuba ===
Several attempts by Cubans to seek asylum at the embassies of South American countries set the stage for the events of the spring of 1980. On 21 March 1978, two young Cuban writers who had been punished for dissent and denied permission to emigrate, Reynaldo Colas Pineda and Esteban Luis Cárdenas Junquera, unsuccessfully sought asylum in the Argentine embassy in Havana and were sentenced to two years in prison. On May 12, 1979, 12 Cubans sought to take asylum in the Venezuelan embassy in Havana by crashing their bus through a fence to gain entry to the grounds and the building. In January 1980, groups of asylum seekers took refuge in the Peruvian and Venezuelan embassies, and Venezuela called its ambassador home for consultations to protest that they had been fired on by the Cuban police. In March, Peru recalled its ambassador, who had denied entry to a dozen Cubans who were seeking asylum in his embassy.

The embassy invasions then evolved into a confrontation between the Cuban government and the Havana embassies. A group of Cubans attempted to enter the Peruvian embassy in the last week of March, and on April 1, a group of six driving a city bus was successful in doing so, and a Cuban guard was killed by a ricocheting bullet. The Peruvians announced that they would not hand those who were seeking asylum over to Cuban police. The embassy grounds contained two 2-story buildings and gardens covering an area the size of a US football field, or 6,400 square yards. The Cuban government announced on 4 April that it was withdrawing its security forces, who were normally officers from the Interior Ministry armed with automatic weapons, from that embassy: "We cannot protect embassies that do not cooperate in their own protection." Following that announcement, about 50 Cubans entered the embassy grounds. By nightfall on April 5, that number had grown to 2,000, including many children and a few former political prisoners.

==== Approval to emigrate ====
Cuban officials announced through loudspeakers that anyone who had not entered the embassy grounds by force was free to emigrate if another country granted them entry. Peruvian president Francisco Morales had announced a willingness to accept asylum seekers. Diplomats from several countries met with the Peruvians to discuss the situation, including the crowd's requirements of food and shelter. An official of the US State Department stated on April 5 that the country would both grant asylum to bona fide political prisoners and handle other requests to immigrate by following standard procedures, which provided for the issuance of 400 immigrant visas per month to Cubans, with preference given to those with family members who were already in the United States.

By April 6, the crowd had reached 10,000, and as sanitary conditions on the embassy grounds deteriorated, Cuban authorities prevented further access. By April 8, 3,700 of the asylum-seekers had accepted safe-conduct passes to return to their homes, and the government began to provide shipments of food and water. However, reports state that only 1,730 accepted the safe-conduct passes. The Cuban government called those who within the embassy grounds "bums, antisocial elements, delinquents, and trash." Peru tried to organize an international relief program, and it won commitments first from Bolivia, Colombia, Ecuador, and Venezuela to help with resettlement, and then from Spain, which agreed to accept 500. By April 11, the Cuban government began to furnish asylum seekers with documents that guaranteed their right to emigrate, including permanent safe-conduct passes and passports. In the first two days, about 3,000 received those papers and left the grounds. On 14 April, US President Jimmy Carter announced the US would accept 3,500 refugees and that Costa Rica had agreed to provide a staging area for screening potential immigrants.

==== Emigration process and violence ====
Soon after the embassy crisis, and the approval for general emigration for those outside the embassy, Fidel Castro commented in his May Day address on the emigration of homosexuals, prostitutes, and other Lumpenproletarians, who already tried to emigrate via the Peruvian embassy:

But the large majority of the people there were of that kind: Lumpen. Some limp wrists [effeminate males]. Some shameless creatures who had been covering up. You know it; the committees [for the Defense of the Revolution] know it better than anyone. They know that some of those managed to slip through. By the way, they are the ones that produce the most irritation.

In the same speech, Castro goes on to comment on the differing physicalities of Cuban patriots and Cuban emigrants.

He who has no revolutionary genes, he who has no revolutionary blood, he who does not have a mind that can adapt to the idea of a revolution, he who does not have a heart that can adapt to the effort of heroism required by a revolution: We do not want them; we do not need them.

Historian Alexandra Minna Stern, asserts that this statement on the emigrants, embodies a pseudo-eugenicist attitude, that the Cuban population must embody a soldierly masculinity, or be removed from the population. This rhetoric about loyal soldierly Cubans, opposing the "scum" emigrants, became commonplace in the unfolding harassment campaigns against emigrants.

The Cuban government soon organized acts of repudiation against those who wished to leave the island. Mobs would sometimes beat their targets, force them to walk around with accusatory signs on their necks, or trash their homes. The emigrants were accused to be loafers, criminals, and drug addicts, and their expulsion was allegedly a kind of social cleansing. The physical assaults and verbal taunts that occurred during acts of repudiation were organized for months and created a sense of fear throughout Cuba. Many who participated in the violence did so to remain un-persecuted themselves, and some participants even left in the boatlift.

The Cuban government facilitated an emigration process that gave special privilege to those who were socially undesirable. People deemed homosexual would be allowed to leave the country. Those with gender non-conforming behavior were especially targeted by authorities for departure. Some of them were given the option between emigration and jail time, in order to encourage their departure from the island. Many Cubans would enter police stations and state that they engaged in homosexual behavior whether true or not, simply to be granted permission to leave the country.

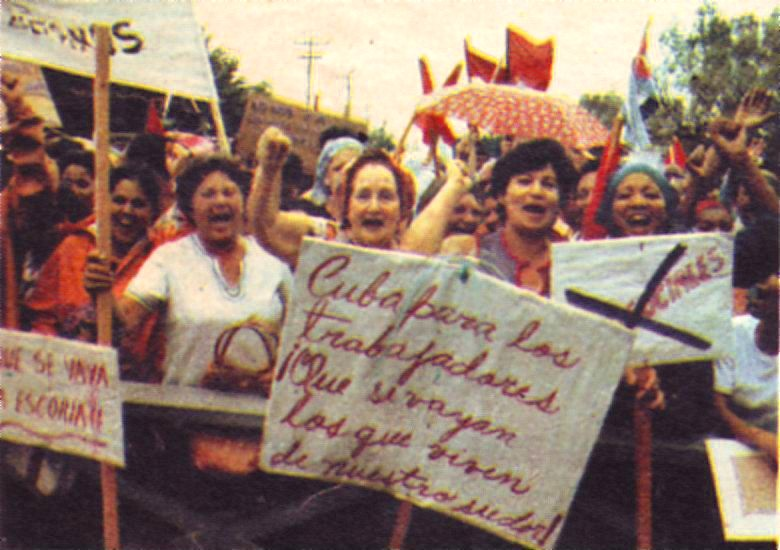
Demonstrations in Cuba expressing disdain for Marielitos and support for the government

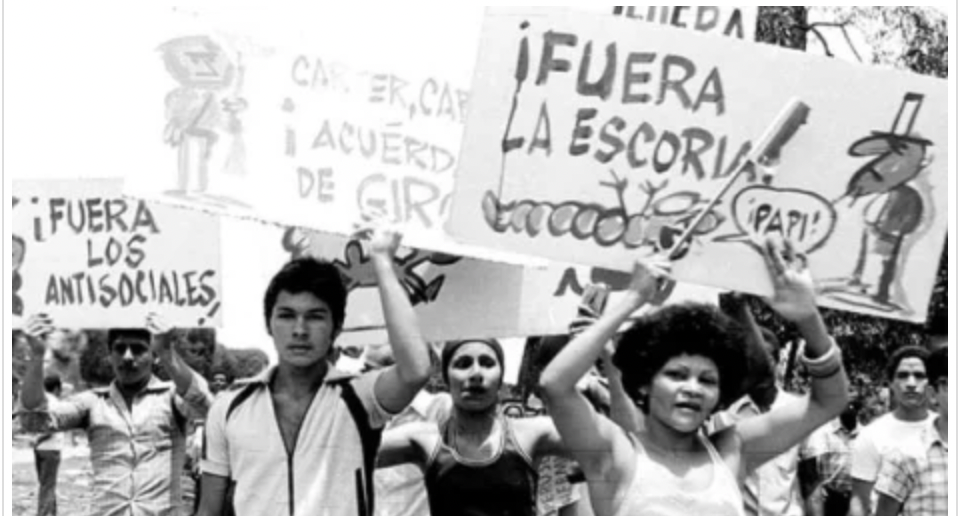
March in Cuba condemning Mariel emigrants. The sign the foreground reads "away with the filth!" and depicts the Marielitos as a gusano fawning at the feet of Uncle Sam.

=== Concerns of Haitian refugees ===
The Carter administration was negotiating the legal status of Haitian refugees as the Mariel boatlift began. As Cuban refugees began to arrive in the United States, a focus was put on the treatment of Haitian refugees, and Carter declared Haitian refugees and Cuban refugees would be accepted in the same manner. The United States would label all refugees that would come in during the Mariel boatlift as "Cuban-Haitian entrants," to be approved at the discretion of the Attorney General.

== Exodus ==
Cuban arrivals during the Mariel episode by month
Month	Arrivals (#)	Arrivals (%)
April (from 21 April)	7,665	6
May	86,488	69
June	21,287	17
July	2,629	2
August	3,939	3
September	3,258	3
Total	125,000	100

=== Airlift from Cuba ===
At first, emigrants were permitted to leave Cuba via flights to Costa Rica, followed by eventual relocation to countries that would accept them. After news coverage of celebratory masses of Cubans emigrating by flight to Costa Rica, the Cuban government declared that emigrants had to leave by flying directly to their accepting country; 7,500 Cubans left the country by those initial flights.

=== Boatlift ===
==== Departure from Cuba and Haiti ====
Castro stated ultimately on 20 April that the port of Mariel would be opened to anyone wishing to leave Cuba if they had someone to pick them up. Soon after Castro's decree, many Cuban Americans began making arrangements to pick up refugees in the harbor. On April 21, the first boat from the harbor docked in Key West and held 48 refugees. By April 25 as many as 300 boats were picking up refugees in Mariel Harbor. Cuban officials also packed refugees into Cuban fishing vessels. Around 1,700 boats brought thousands of Cubans from Mariel to Florida between the months of April and October in that year.

Haitian refugees had been continuously coming to the United States before the Mariel boatlift and continued to do so with the flotilla.

==== United States and Cuba policy changes ====
After the arrival of thousands of refugees, Florida Governor Bob Graham declared a state of emergency in Monroe and Dade Counties on April 28. According to a US Coast Guard report, 15,761 refugees had arrived in Florida by early May. On May 6, Carter declared a state of emergency in the areas of Florida most "severely affected" by the exodus, and an open arms policy in which all refugees fleeing Cuba would receive temporary status. On June 20 the Cuban-Haitian Entrant Program (CHEP) was established, and Haitians would be given the same legal status as Cuban refugees in the United States during the Mariel boatlift. Around 25,000 Haitians entered the United States during the boatlift.

In response, Carter then called for a blockade on the flotilla by the US Coast Guard. At least 1,400 boats were seized, but many slipped by, and over 100,000 more Cuban and Haitian refugees continued to pour into Florida over the next five months. The Mariel Boatlift ended by agreement between the United States and Cuba in October 1980.

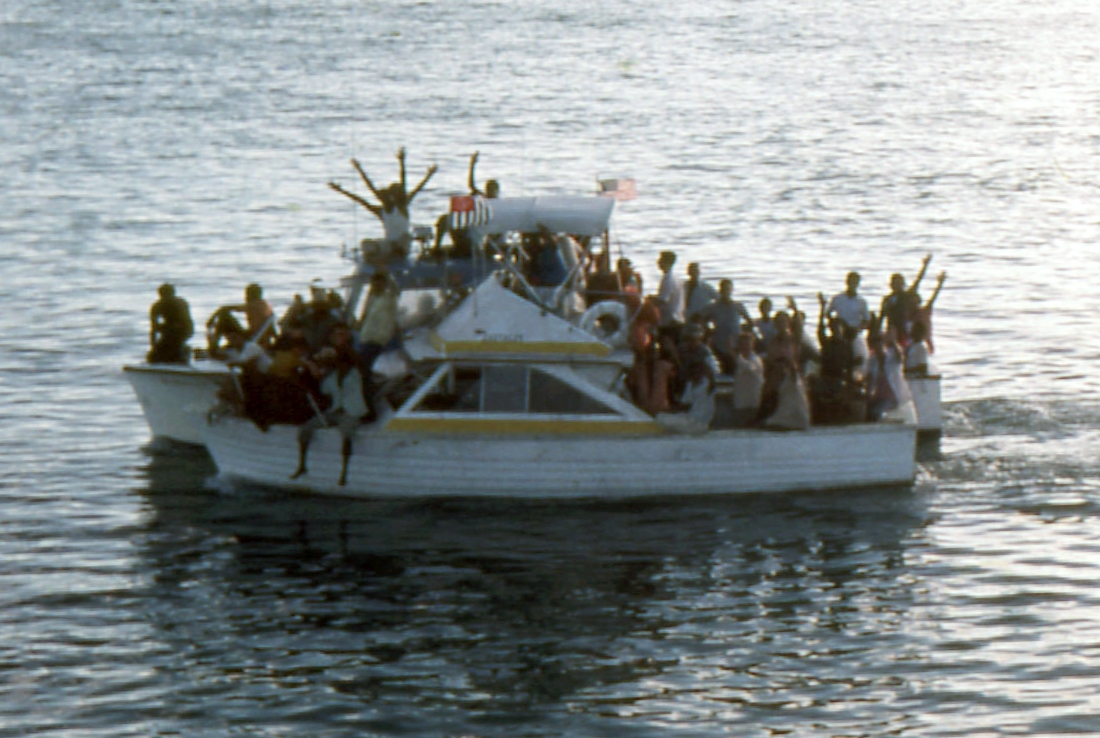
An overloaded boat of Marielitos in Key West

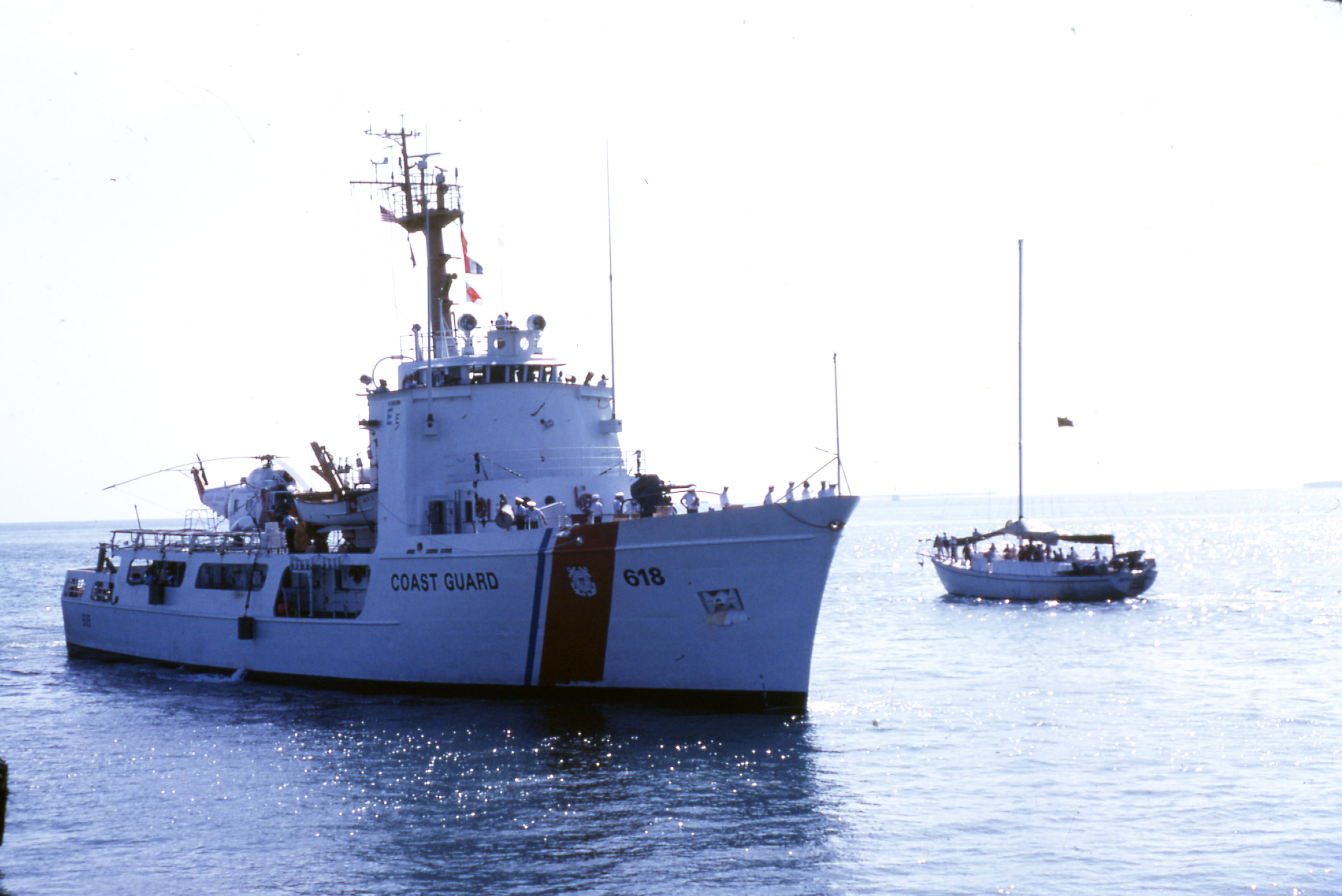
A U.S. Coast Guard vessel in Key West during the Mariel boatlift

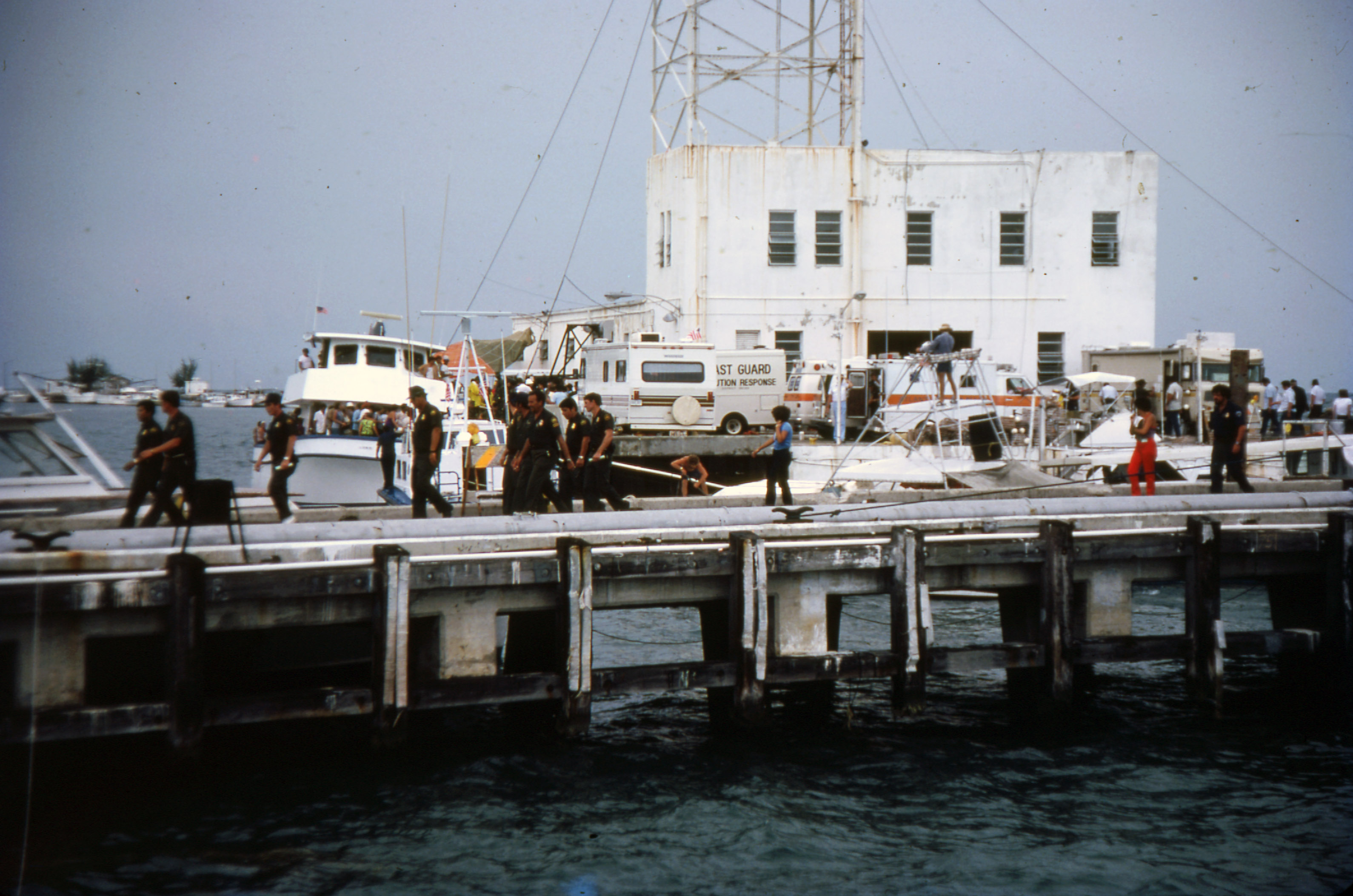
Pier B of the Truman Annex during the boatlift

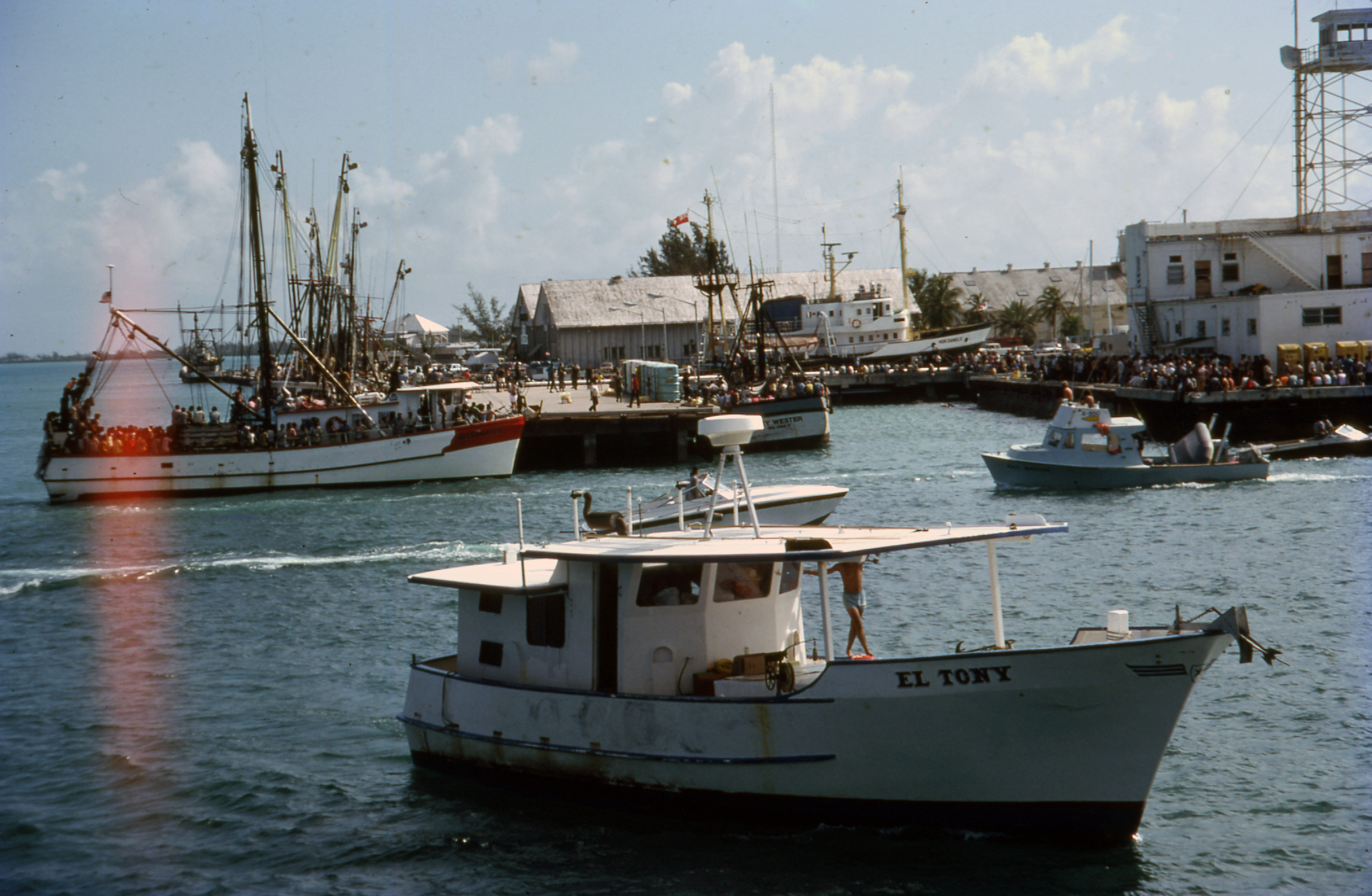
Ships at Pier B at the Truman Annex

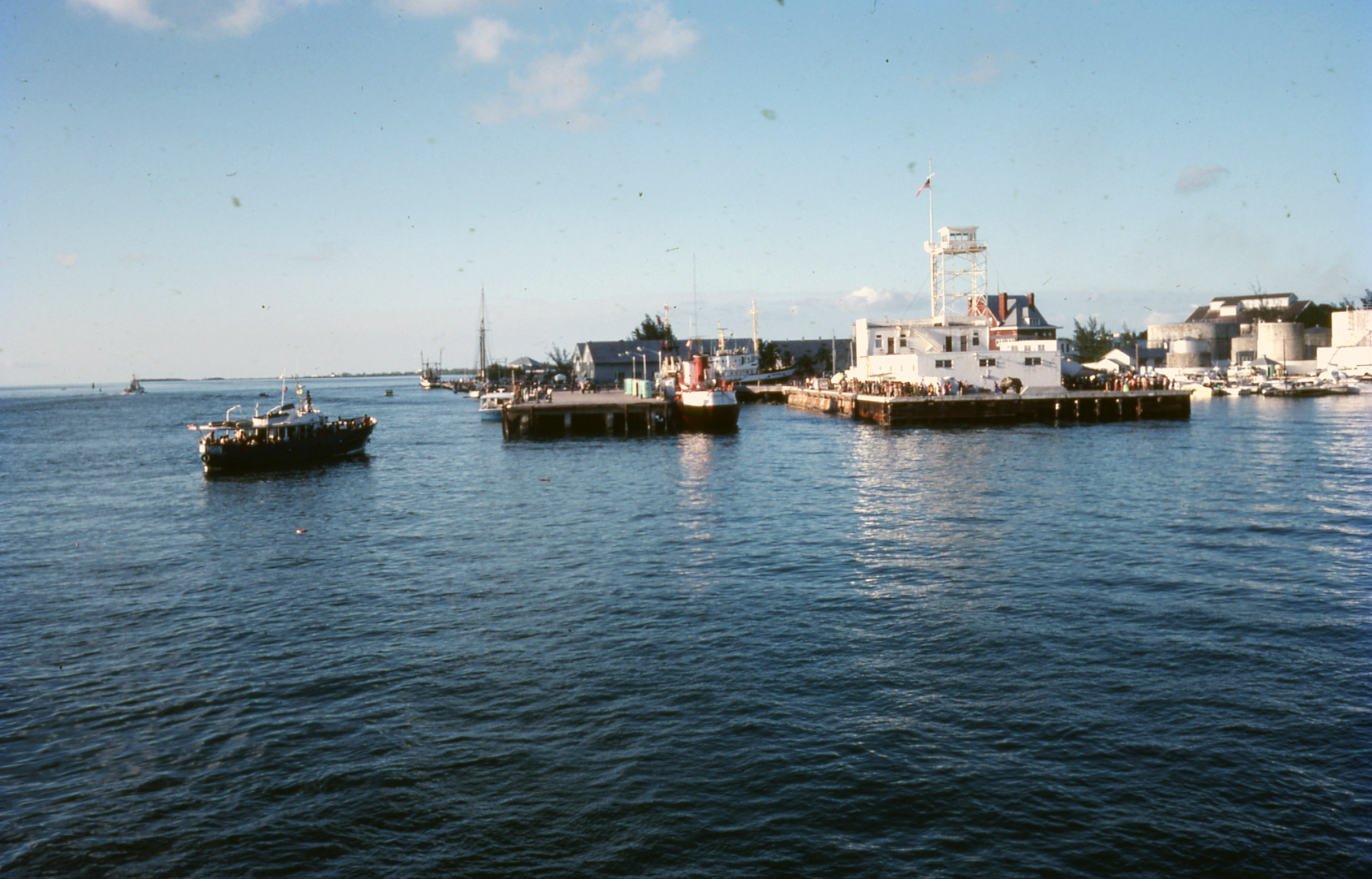
Cuban refugees at Pier B of the Truman Annex

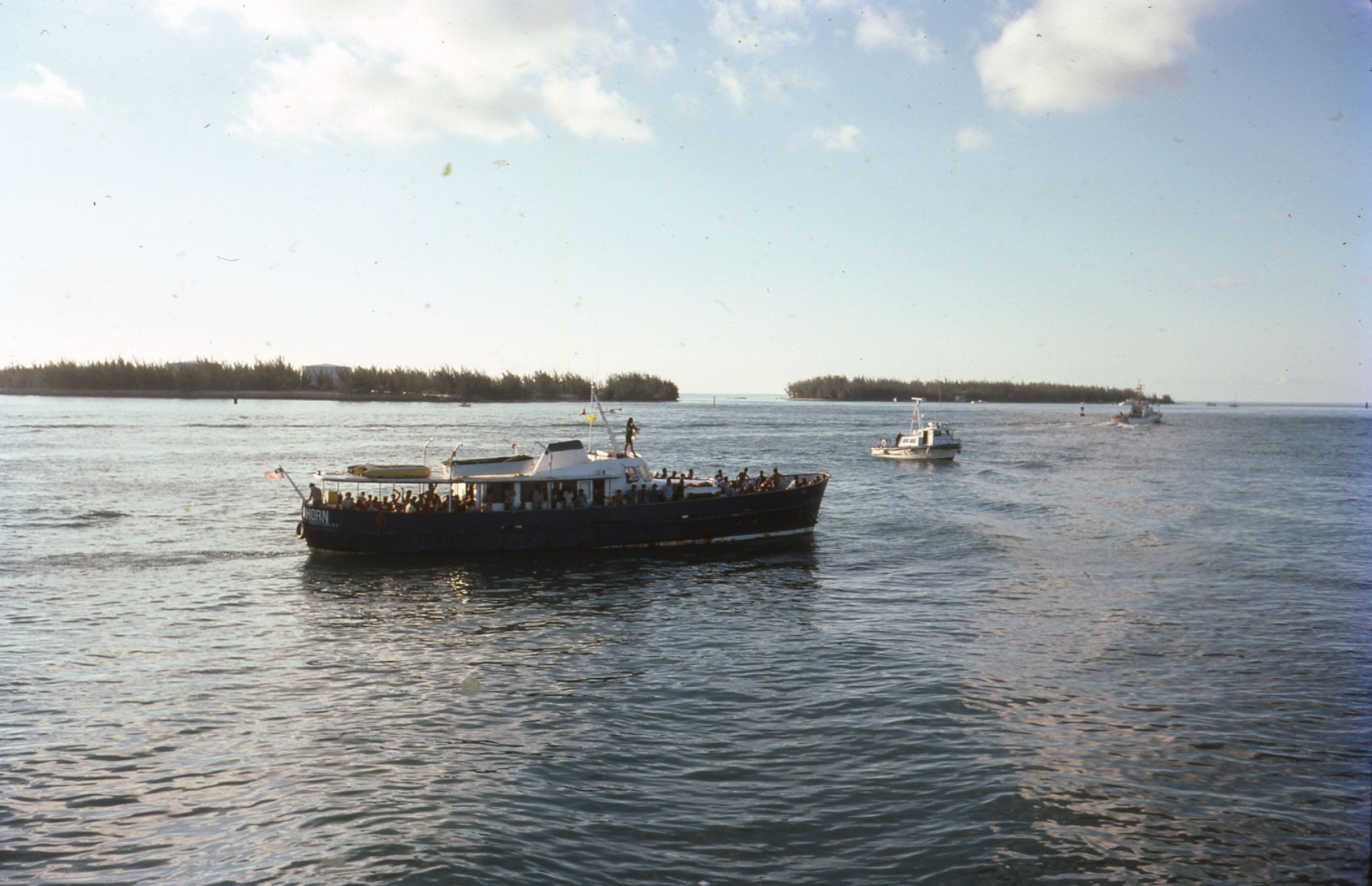
Boat filled with Cuban refugees arriving at Key West

== Arrival ==
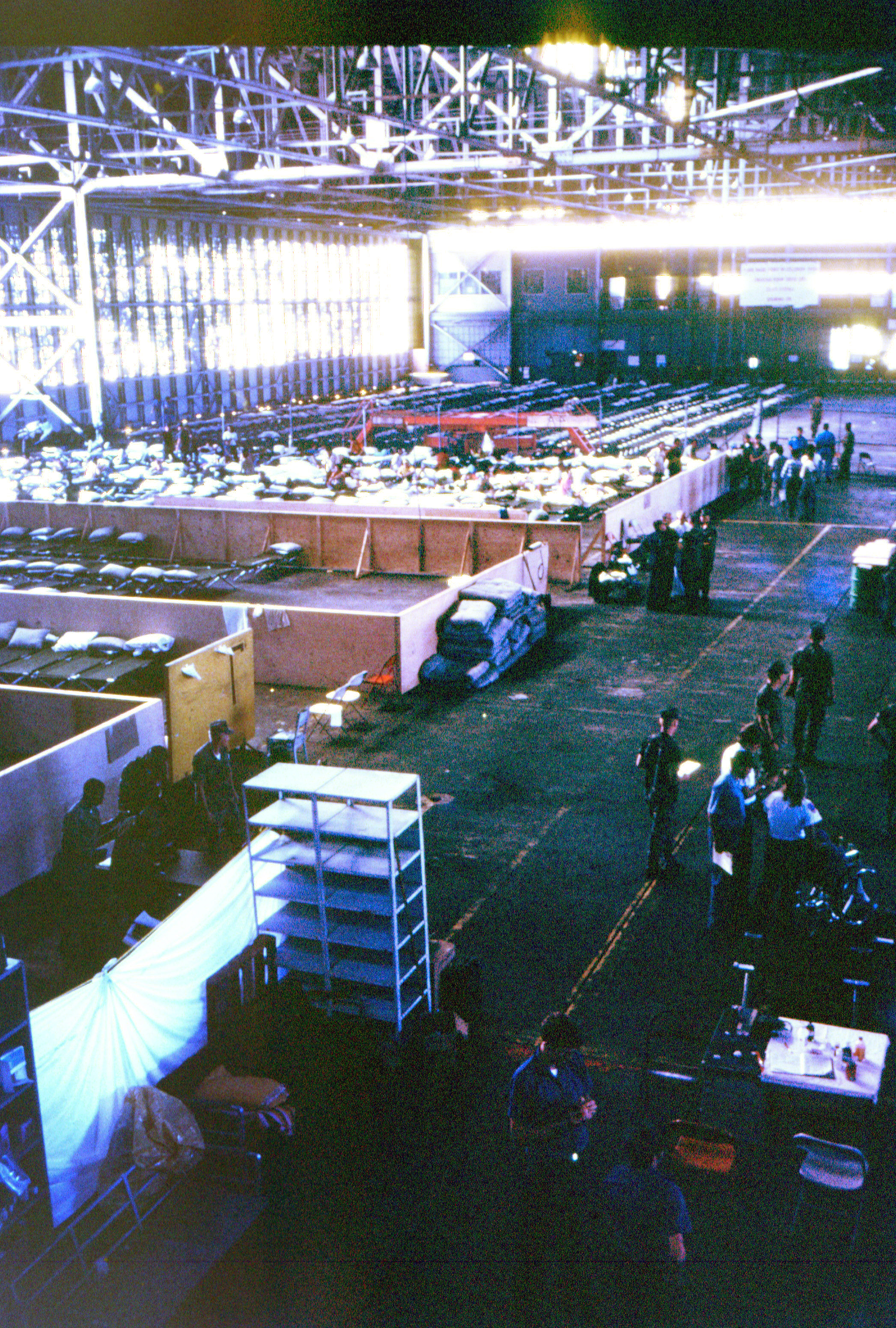
Mariel Boatlift refugee center at Trumbo Point, in Key West.

=== Miami ===
Refugees were processed at camps set up in the greater Miami area, generally at decommissioned missile defense sites. Other sites were established at the Miami Orange Bowl and at various churches throughout the area. Some sites were established to segregate the refugees until they could be provided with initial processing at places such as the Nike–Hercules sites at Key Largo and Krome Avenue. Once they were initially processed and documented, the refugees were quickly transferred to larger compounds in the metropolitan area to allow them to be reunited with relatives who already lived in the United States and to allow interaction with various social-action agencies such as Catholic Charities and the American Red Cross. Regional resettlement facilities became crucial sites in the social and cultural negotiation of the status and desirability of Mariel Cubans.

As the Haitian refugees started arriving, interpreters were found to be in short supply for Haitian Creole, and interpreters from the local Haitian community were put under contract through the Federal Emergency Management Agency (FEMA). As the end of the initial crisis period wound down and after the vetting of the refugees who could be sponsored had run its course, the decision was made to transfer the "hard to sponsor" refugees, which included those with criminal records, to longer-term processing sites at Fort Chaffee in Arkansas, Fort Indiantown Gap in Pennsylvania and Fort McCoy in Wisconsin.

==== McDuffie riot ====
During the Mariel boatlift, the McDuffie riots were raging in the Liberty City and Overtown neighborhoods of Miami. It has been argued the riots were exacerbated by the diversion of social and policing resources from African-American communities to care for Mariel refugees, and the anger at the perceived privileges Cuban refugees held compared to African Americans and Haitian refugees.

== Processing ==
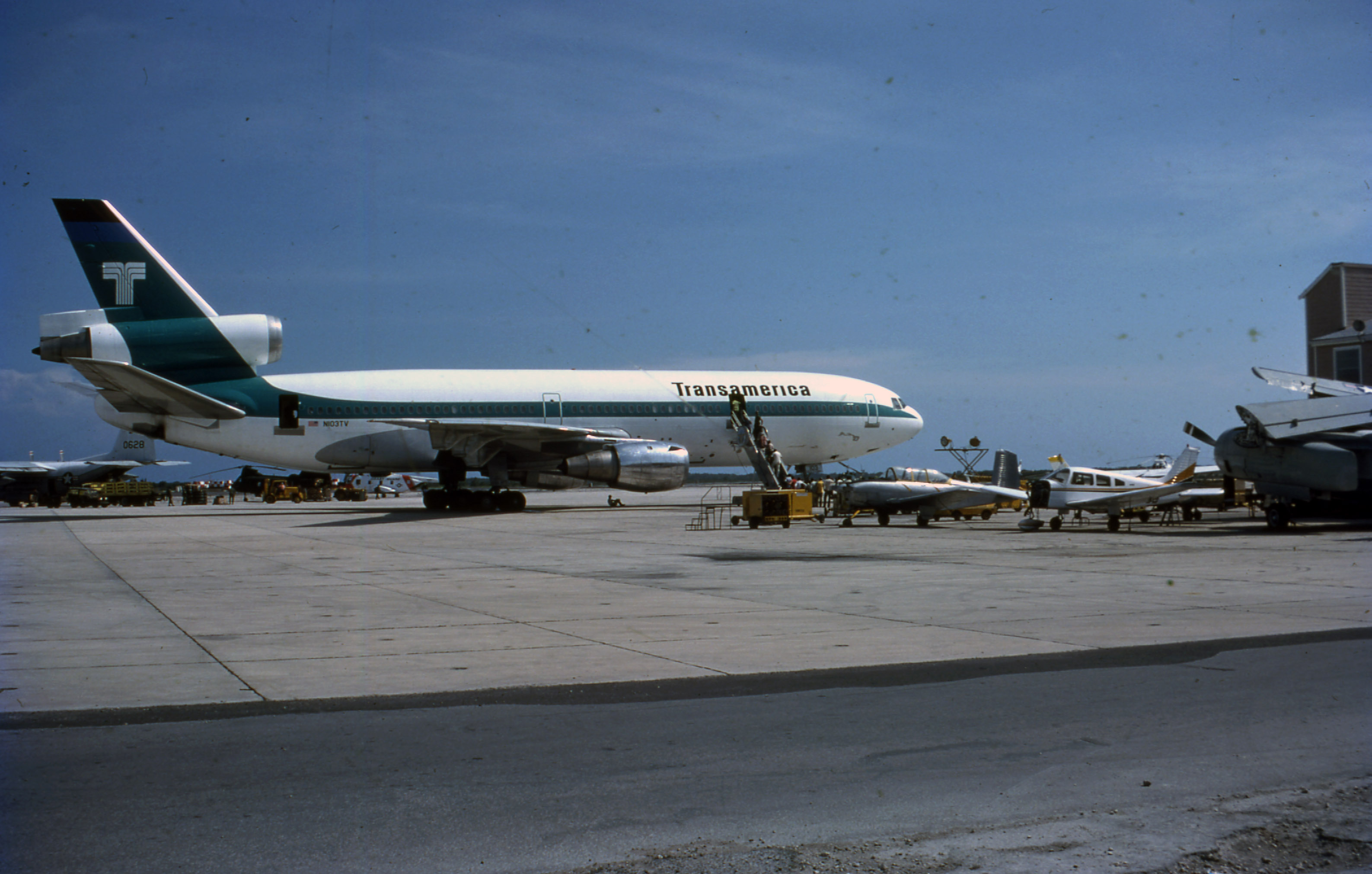
A Transamerica jet being loaded with Cuban refugees in 1980

=== Dispersal to refugee camps ===
Crowded conditions in South Florida immigration processing centers forced U.S. federal agencies to move many of the Marielitos to other centers in Fort Indiantown Gap; Fort McCoy; Camp Santiago, Puerto Rico; and Fort Chaffee. Federal civilian police agencies such as the General Services Administration's Federal Protective Service provided officers to maintain order inside the gates of the relocation centers. Riots occurred at the Fort Chaffee center and some detainees escaped, an event that became a campaign issue in the re-election defeat of Governor Bill Clinton.

=== Evolving legal status ===
Most refugees were ordinary Cubans. Many had been allowed to leave Cuba for reasons that in the United States were loyalty-neutral or protected; for example, tens of thousands were Seventh-Day Adventists or Jehovah's Witnesses. Some had been declared "antisocialist" in Cuba by their CDRs. In the end, only 2.2 percent (or 2,746) of the refugees were classified as serious or violent criminals under US law and denied citizenship on that basis.

In 1984, the Mariel refugees from Cuba received permanent legal status under a revision to the Cuban Adjustment Act of 1966. Haitians were instead considered to be economic refugees, which made them unable to get the same residency status as Cubans and therefore subject to deportation. Two years later, under the Immigration Reform and Control Act of 1986, all Cuban-Haitian entrants who had immigrated in 1980 were able to apply for permanent residency.

By 1987, several hundred Marielitos were still detained because they were inadmissible under immigration law. Local police departments had also arrested around seven thousand Marielitos for felonies committed in the United States. Those arrested there served their prison sentences, only to be detained by INS as candidates for deportation.

The United States–Cuba Migration Agreement of 1987 allowed for 3,000 former political prisoners to emigrate to the United States and allowed for the deportation of undesired Marielitos. After news of the agreement broke, many detained Marielitos in Oakdale and Atlanta prisons rioted and took hostages. The riots ended after an agreement was reached to stop deportations until all detainees were given a fair review of their deportation case. After 1987, the United States continued to deport Marielitos who were deemed undesirable.

=== Later developments ===
By June 2016, 478 remained to be deported; according to the U.S. Department of Homeland Security, some are elderly or sick, and the Department had no desire to send these back to Cuba. Under a 2016 agreement with the Cuban government, the U.S. will deport the final remaining migrants deemed as serious criminals.

== Aftermath ==
=== Task Force ===
An early response to address the aftermath of the Mariel boatlift was the 1983 city of Miami's formation of the East Little Havana Task Force. Task Force members were appointed by the Miami City Commission, with urban planner and Cuban community leader Jesús Permuy named as its chair. It was tasked with studying the social and economic effects of the boatlift, particularly in Little Havana, which was an epicenter of the migration. The Task Force adjourned a year later and submitted its findings and official recommendations, called The East Little Havana Redevelopment Plan, to the Miami City Commission and Mayor's Office in 1984.

=== Effect on Miami crime ===
At the time, the Immigration and Naturalization Service identified 1,306 migrants as having "questionable" backgrounds. Scholars have found that many Mariel immigrants with criminal records were incarcerated for minor crimes that would not be considered crimes in the US, such as selling goods in the black market. Estimates assert that the Cuban refugees included 2,700 hardened criminals.

A 1985 Sun Sentinel magazine article claimed that out of the around 125,000 refugees that entered the United States, around 16,000 to 20,000 were estimated to be criminals. In a 1985 report around 350 to 400 Mariel Cubans were reported to inhabit Dade County jails on a typical day.

=== Effect on Miami labor market ===
About half of the Mariel immigrants decided to live in Miami permanently, which resulted in a 7 percent increase in workers in the Miami labor market and a 20 percent increase in the Cuban working population. Aside from the unemployment rate rising from 5.0 percent in April 1980 to 7.1 percent in July, the actual damage to the economy was marginal and followed trends across the United States at the time. When observing data from 1979 to 1985 on the Miami labor market and comparing it with similar data from several other major cities across the United States, focusing on wages, the effects of the boatlift were marginal. There have been several explanations offered for the findings by David Card. According to economist Ethan Lewis, the Miami labor market had already seen an increase in "unskilled intensive manufactured goods", allowing it to offset the impact of the Cuban migrants. Miami also increased its diversity in manufacturing industries at a negligible rate compared to other US cities following the boat lift. According to data from the Annual Surveys of Manufacturers, Miami's Manufacturing industries regressed only 0.01 percentage points post-1980, which indicates a minimal impact from the boat lift on the labor market. Miami also experienced a limited increased in skilled laborers after the boat lift. According to data from Lewis, Miami experienced limited change in workers who were literate in computer use, factoring out to a 0.010 percentage change in skilled laborers than in Card's research.

The wages for White Americans remained steady in both Miami and comparable cities. The wage rates for African Americans were relatively steady from 1979 to 1985 when in comparable cities it dropped. Apart from a dip in 1983, wage rates for non-Cuban Hispanics were stable, while in comparable cities it fell approximately 6 percent. There is no evidence of a negative effect on wage rates for other groups of Hispanics in Miami. Wages for Cubans demonstrated a steady decline especially compared with other groups in Miami at the time. This can be attributed exclusively to the "dilution" of the group with the new, less-experienced, and lower-earning Mariel immigrants, meaning that there is also no evidence of a negative effect on wage rates for Cubans living in Miami prior to 1980.

The Refugee Education Assistance Act of 1980 provided $100 million in cash and medical and social services and authorized approximately $5 million per year to facilitate the refugees' transition to American life. The 1980 Census was also adjusted to include Mariel children to ensure that additional assistance would be available to them through the Miami-Dade County Public Schools via Title I of the Elementary and Secondary Education Act (ESEA).

==== 2016 reappraisal ====
In 2016 Harvard economist George J. Borjas revisited David Card's analysis in light of new insights into immigration effects since 1990. He used the same current population survey (CPS) data. However, he focused only on workers who were

- non-Hispanic (as the best approximation to the native-born)
- aged 25–59 (prime working age)
- male
- high-school dropouts

The last characteristic was especially important since 60 percent of Marielitos did not complete high school. And even many of the remaining 40 percent who had completed high school were looking for unskilled jobs because of their lack of linguistic and other skills. Marielitos, therefore, competed directly with high-school dropouts.

Borjas next compared the inflation-adjusted wages of Miami residents who had those characteristics with wages of the same segment of the American population in all other American metropolitan areas except Miami. His analysis shows that the Miami wages for native-born men without high-school diplomas were much lower than the wages for similar workers in other US metropolitan areas during the 1980s and then again in the late 1990s, following the two spikes of Cubans migrating to Miami.

One of his conclusions was that during the 1980s, wages in Miami were a full 20 percent lower than they were elsewhere. In 2017, an analysis of Borjas' study on the effects of the boatlift concluded that Borjas' findings "may simply be spurious" and that his theory of the economic impact of the boatlift "doesn't fit the evidence." A number of other studies concluded the opposite of what Borjas' study had found.

Writing for the IZA Institute of Labor Economics, the two economists Michael Clemens and Jennifer Hunt have claimed that conflicting results could be explained by the changes in the subsample composition of the CPS data. In 1980, the share of non-Hispanic blacks doubled in the subgroup of Miami male prime working-age high-school dropouts studied by Borjas. No similar increases occurred in the subgroups of populations in the control cities identified by either Card or Borjas. Since there was a large and significant difference between wages of black and nonblack high-school dropouts, the changing composition of the CPS subgroups created a spurious decline in the wages of the native population. According to Clemens and Hunt, the compositional effect accounts for the entire impact of the Mariel boatlift on the wages of native workers estimated by Borjas.

=== Effect on political attitudes ===
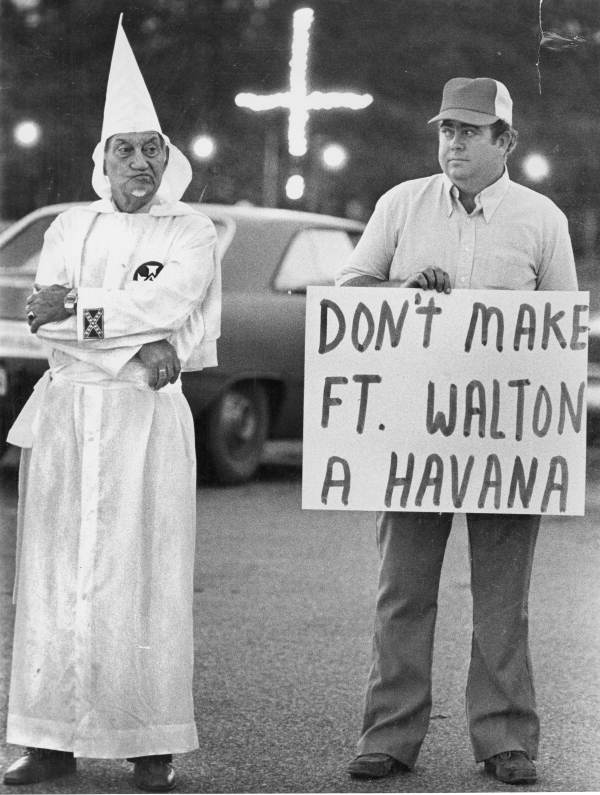
Klansmen displaying antipathy towards recent Cuban arrivals. Photo taken in 1980.

Fidel Castro stated that those leaving in the Mariel boatlift were undesirable members of Cuban society. With Castro's condemnation and reports that prisoners and mental health patients were leaving in the exodus it was believed by some that Marielitos were undesirable deviants. Opponents of then U.S. president Jimmy Carter and the Democratic Party would hail the Mariel boatlift as a failure of his administration. Ronald Reagan would instead praise Marielitos in his ideological campaign against Cuba. The boatlift would also help spark policy demands for English-only government paperwork after Miami Dade County residents voted to remove Spanish as a second official language in November 1980. In 2017, U.S. president Donald Trump's senior policy adviser Stephen Miller used the boatlift as evidence of the dangers of unchecked immigration.

Initially, many Americans disapproved of the boatlift. According to a June 1980 poll conducted by CBS and the New York Times, 71% of Americans disapproved of the boatlift and allowing Cuban nationals to settle in the United States.

== In popular culture ==
The boatlift has been the subject of a number of works of art, media, and entertainment. Examples include:

- Against Wind and Tide: A Cuban Odyssey (1981), a PBS documentary film nominated for the Academy Award for Best Documentary Feature
- Scarface (1983), a dramatic film about a Marielito who becomes a drug lord. The film uses footage of the El Mariel coming to Miami.
- The Perez Family, a novel by Christine Bell; a group of Marielitos who share the same last name pretend to be a family
- The Perez Family (1995), a film based on the novel
- Before Night Falls (1992; English translation 1993), the autobiography of Marielito Reinaldo Arenas
- Before Night Falls (2000), a film based on the book
- 90 Miles (2001), an American documentary film and memoir, written and directed by Marielito Juan Carlos Zaldívar
- Finding Mañana: A Memoir of a Cuban Exodus (2005), a memoir by Mirta Ojito
- Voices from Mariel (2011), a documentary film that tells the story of ten families
- Voices from Mariel: Oral Histories of the 1980 Cuban Boatlift
- White Lies, Season 2 (2023)
- Worm: A Cuban American odyssey (2023), graphic novel memoir by Edel Rodriguez
- The Bluest Sky (2024), teen historical fiction by Christina Diaz Gonzalez

The events at the Peruvian embassy are depicted in:

- Todos se van (Everyone's Leaving; 2006 in Spanish; 2013 in English), a novel by Wendy Guerra
- Cuerpos al borde de una isla; mi salida de Cuba por Mariel (2010), a memoir by Reinaldo García Ramos about his experiences during the Boatlift

The Marielitos and the boatlift also featured in the Netflix series Griselda portraying Griselda Blanco's life in Miami where she employed them.

== Notable Marielitos ==
Notable Mariel boatlift refugees include:

- Edel Rodriguez, artist, illustrator, and children's book author
- Carlos Alfonzo, a painter and sculptor
- Reinaldo Arenas, poet and novelist
- Ignacio Berroa, jazz drummer
- Elizabeth Caballero, opera singer
- Hugo Cancio, businessman, CEO of Fuego Enterprises, publisher of the magazine OnCuba
- Felix Delgado, rapper and songwriter known as Cuban Link
- Olga María Rodríguez Fariñas, widow of William Alexander Morgan, a leader of rebel forces in the Cuban Revolution
- Luis Felipe, convicted murderer and founder of the New York branch of the Latin Kings gang
- Bárbaro Garbey, baseball player and coach
- Julio González, arsonist and mass-murderer
- Francisco del Junco, serial killer
- Rene Lavan, actor and soap opera star
- Mailet Lopez, founder of I Had Cancer, a social networking site
- Pedro Medina, executed for murder
- Jesus Mezquia, murderer of Mia Zapata
- Emilio Nuñez, murderer of his fellow refugee ex-wife Maritza Martin
- Mirta Ojito, writer and Pulitzer Prize winner
- Ras Juan Perez, founder of the Cuban reggae band Arawak Jah
- Orlando "Puntilla" Ríos, folkloric percussionist and vocalist
- Felipe García Villamil, Palo Monte priest, drummer, and artist
- Manuel Machado Alvarez, murderer
- Pedro Zamora, AIDS educator and activist

== See also ==
- 1980 diplomatic protection incident at the Peruvian Embassy, Havana
- Camarioca boatlift
- Cuba–United States relations
- Garcia-Mir v. Meese (1986 Circuit Court decision)
- "1980 Year in Review: Operation Boatlift/Exodus of Cuban Exiles". United Press International.
