= Snitch Law =

2008 Venezuelan law

- Presented: 28 May 2008
- Repealed: 10 June 2008
- Author(s): Hugo Chávez
- Media type: Law
- Subject: Espionage

The Military Intelligence and Counterintelligence Law, popularly known as the Snitch Law (Spanish: Ley Sapo), was a law in Venezuela passed on 28 May 2008 during the government of Hugo Chávez that established the obligation for any person to comply with intelligence tasks if requested by the authorities, with the penalty of being prosecuted in case of refusal. The colloquial term in Spanish comes from popular Venezuelan slang in which a snitch is referred to as a "sapo" (Spanish for toad). After strong opposition against the law, Chávez repealed the law on 10 June 2008.

== History ==
The law came into effect on 28 May 2008 after being published in Official Gazette No. 38,940. Said law established the obligation for any person to comply with intelligence and counter-intelligence work in case of being requested by the authorities, with the penalty of being prosecuted by the Public Ministry in case of refusal. It was approved by President Hugo Chávez after the National Assembly granted him the special legislative powers of the enabling law. The colloquial term for the law comes from Venezuelan slang in which a snitch is referred to as a "sapo" (Spanish for toad). The legislation was criticized by human rights organizations, which warned that it violated the constitution and could create a spy society, as well as by the Venezuelan student movement. The instrument was also compared to Cuba's informant networks and concern was expressed that the basic rights of suspects were denied, as was access to information. The non-governmental organization Foro Penal asked its annulment before the Supreme Tribunal of Justice.

The legislation led to protests against it, demanding its repeal, including on June 9 and 10 in Caracas, when multiple posters and effigies of toads with red berets were hung on the streets. Originally, Chavez and his cabinet justified the law as "anti-coup" and "anti-imperialist" for several days, but between June 7 and 8, Chávez initially declared that the law would be amended and subsequently announced its repeal on 10 June 2008; the repeal became effective in Official Gazette No. 38,949 in Decree No. 6156 just 14 days after its publication. Alfredo Romero, member of Foro Penal, stated that it was the first time in the history of Venezuela that an intelligence law existed and described the repeal as "a triumph of the citizenry". According to analysts, the purpose of the rectification was to regain the confidence of the public before the 2008 regional elections scheduled for November.

== Legacy ==
Despite the repeal of the Snitch Law, its main directives were gradually applied until culminating in the Articulation and Socio-Political Action Network, a social structure of espionage.

== See also ==
- Committees for the Defense of the Revolution
