= Murder of Donna Fitzgerald =

2008 murder of a female correction officer in Florida

- Donna Fitzgerald
- Location: Tomoka Correctional Institution, Florida, United States
- Date: June 25, 2008
- Attack type: Murder by stabbing
- Deaths: Donna Fitzgerald, 50
- Verdict: Guilty
- Convictions: First-degree murder
- Sentence: Death (January 15, 2010)
- Convicted: Enoch Hall

On June 25, 2008, Donna Fitzgerald, a 50-year-old female corrections officer at Tomoka Correctional Institution, was killed by Enoch Donnell Hall (born February 15, 1969), who used a prison shank to stab her multiple times. At the time of the offense, Hall had been serving two life sentences for rape and kidnapping charges since 1994. Hall was arrested, put on trial and convicted of first-degree murder, and he was sentenced to death on January 15, 2010. He remains on death row as of 2026.

== Murder ==
On June 25, 2008, a female corrections officer was murdered by a prisoner while on duty at the Tomoka Correctional Institution. The victim, 50-year-old Donna Fitzgerald, was found dead at the Prison Rehabilitative Industries and Diversified Enterprises (PRIDE) compound, where her body was discovered draped in gray wool blankets over a cart in the compound's work unit, with her pants and underwear pulled down to her knees. Prior to the discovery, Sergeant Suzanne Webster, the prison's control room supervisor, did not receive a radio response from Fitzgerald about the inmate count, and out of concern over the lack of response, Webster radioed Officer Chad Weber, who went with Sergeant Bruce MacNeil to search for Fitzgerald. When the officers arrived at the PRIDE facility, they witnessed an inmate running through an open door on the other end of one of the PRIDE buildings, and they gave chase and later captured him. The prisoner, 39-year-old Enoch Hall, admitted that he killed Fitzgerald, and he was placed under arrest. Afterwards, Officer Weber and Sergeant MacNeil, who were joined by Captain Shannon Wiggins, entered the building, where they found Fitzgerald's body.

After his arrest, Hall confessed to murdering Fitzgerald when questioned by officers of the Florida Department of Law Enforcement during three separate interviews. According to his statements and evidence, Hall stayed at the machine shop after his work shift ended, and he consumed four pills another prisoner gave him. He tried to search for more drugs to no avail. Subsequently, when Fitzgerald arrived to find Hall, he wielded a prison-made knife and stabbed the officer multiple times, leading to her death. After the murder, Hall tried to clean up the blood and hide the murder weapon, placed the body of Fitzgerald (which he wrapped in a blanket) into the cart, and put his shirt in a bucket of water before changing into another inmate's shirt.

At the time of the murder, Hall had been serving two life sentences at the Tomoka Correctional Institution since 1994 for charges of sexual battery with a weapon and kidnapping. These charges originated from a case that occurred in 1993, when Hall kidnapped a 66-year-old woman from an apartment complex in Pensacola, and he also raped the victim. In another case on February 22, 1992, Hall had kidnapped a 23-year-old woman from a Pensacola parking lot, and forcibly took her across state lines from Florida to Alabama, and he was therefore convicted of kidnapping in federal court, although he continued to serve time in a state prison in Florida for the 1993 case.

An autopsy report by Dr. Predrag Bulic showed that Fitzgerald sustained seven knife wounds on her hands and arms, which were consistent with defensive injuries, as well as 15 additional stab wounds on her body, including her stomach, back, and chest, which resulted in two collapsed lungs and also penetrated her liver and heart. The victim also suffered blunt force injuries to her face, which were likely caused by punching, and a gold chain necklace was also tightly wound around her mouth and neck from behind, suggesting that she was strangled during the attack. Although it was reported in early articles that Fitzgerald was being raped before her murder, DNA testing showed no evidence of sexual assault on her body. Hall denied raping the officer.

== Charges and trial ==
=== Investigation and indictment ===
On June 26, 2008, Enoch Hall was held and investigated for committing the murder of Donna Fitzgerald, although no charges were filed at this point. By July 2009, Hall was transferred to Florida State Prison, after he was already charged with first-degree murder, an offence that carries the death penalty under Florida state law if found guilty.

On July 10, 2008, a Volusia County grand jury formally indicted Hall for a charge of first-degree murder. A week after his indictment, Hall formally entered a plea of not guilty, and State Attorney John Tanner, who led the prosecution, announced he would seek the death penalty for Hall.

In December 2008, the trial date of Hall was postponed to March 2009. Ultimately, the trial was set to start on October 12, 2009, and 7th Circuit Chief Judge J. David Walsh was appointed as the trial judge.

=== Trial and sentence ===
On October 12, 2009, Hall's trial began with jury selection at the Volusia County Circuit Court. On October 20, 2009, a 12-member jury was assembled.

The same week after the jury was chosen, Hall was found guilty of first-degree murder. During the trial's penalty phase, the prosecution sought the death penalty on the basis that Hall was serving time for a violent crime at the time of the offense, and also killed a law enforcement officer, and that the murder was "heinous, atrocious and cruel" and committed in a "cold, calculating and premeditated manner". Fitzgerald's mother testified, describing the grief of losing her daughter. "To lose your child to violence tears your whole world apart," she said. The defense sought mercy for Hall, and his family testified that Hall was a good athlete and a good brother as part of the mitigation plea to spare his life.

On October 30, 2009, after 2 1/2 hours of deliberation, the jury unanimously agreed to sentence Hall to death for murdering Fitzgerald.

On January 15, 2010, Hall was formally sentenced to death by Circuit Judge J. David Walsh. Fitzgerald's sister and brother were present in court to hear the sentence, and the sister expressed relief and stated that justice was served, while the brother stated he wanted Hall to be executed. State Attorney R.J. Larizza stated that the death penalty was the "only remedy" for egregious cases committed by criminals like Hall. Under state law, since 2000, inmates sentenced to death in Florida had the option to choose between lethal injection or the electric chair; the former option was the most common execution method in Florida.

== Appeals ==
On August 31, 2012, the Florida Supreme Court dismissed Enoch Hall's direct appeal against his death sentence.

On May 6, 2015, Hall filed an appeal to Circuit Judge J. David Walsh, seeking to overturn his conviction on the grounds that he was represented by ineffective trial counsel during his original murder trial.

On February 9, 2017, the Florida Supreme Court denied Hall's appeal, rejecting his claim that his trial counsel had mishandled his case and also found that the sentence should not be overturned since it was unanimously imposed by the jury. At that time, Florida had changed its laws to allow the jury to mete out the death sentence for convicts only based on unanimous votes, and the law was to apply retroactively to death sentences imposed and finalized after June 24, 2002, the date of a landmark U.S. Supreme Court case, allowing some prisoners to be re-sentenced. However, Hall's death sentence was unanimously meted out by the jury and hence he was deemed ineligible for re-sentencing.

On April 12, 2018, in a 5–2 decision, the Florida Supreme Court once again rejected Hall's appeal against his death sentence.

On February 19, 2019, Hall lost his appeal to the U.S. Supreme Court.

== Death row ==
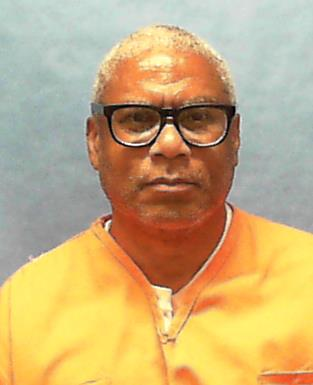
Enoch Donnell Hall Mugshot

A January 2016 report showed that Hall was one of 20 inmates from Volusia and Flagler counties who remained on Florida's death row awaiting execution.

As of August 2019, Hall was one of 16 inmates from Volusia and Flagler Counties who were sentenced to death and still awaiting execution on Florida's death row.

In February 2023, it was reported that Hall was one of 11 Volusia County inmates held on Florida's death row at this point.

As of 2026, Hall remains incarcerated on death row at the Union Correctional Institution.

== Aftermath ==
In July 2008, a month after the murder of Donna Fitzgerald, Florida officials reassessed the inmate eligibility criteria for the PRIDE prison work program, which was started by the non-profit organization PRIDE to equip inmates with skills to reintegrate into society and find employment. Hall had been cleared to join the program even though he had a history of sexual and violent offenses against females. PRIDE spokesman Foster Harbin said that out of the 2,500 inmates still working in the program, less than 10% of them were serving life imprisonment, and the murder of Fitzgerald was the first violent incident involving a PRIDE participant since the program was established in 1981.

In November 2008, the Florida Department of Corrections (FDOC) released an investigative report into the killing of Fitzgerald. The review identified several security and inmate supervision deficiencies that may have contributed to the incident. Among its findings were that Fitzgerald was supervising 13 inmates alone without a personal body alarm or radio; that the inmates had access to tools, hazardous chemicals and sheet metal with limited supervision; and that the prison staff did not consistently carry out security checks on the facility. The report revealed that there was no policy restricting certain inmates from taking part in the work based on the nature of their convictions; all 13 prisoners supervised by Fitzgerald were convicted of murder, sexual battery, or both. At the end of a separate investigation, three correctional employees were demoted and a new warden was appointed at Tomoka Correctional Institution.

An investigation by the FDOC inspector general found the former warden and the prison's high-ranking officials culpable for the "critical security breaches, gross neglect of duty, and ineptitude" that indirectly led to the homicide.

In May 2015, Fitzgerald was one of 29 deceased law enforcement officers (who were all from Volusia and Flagler counties) commemorated at a memorial event in Daytona Memorial Park and Funeral Home. In May 2023, a memorial event was conducted at Daytona Memorial Park to memorialize Fitzgerald and 35 other fallen officers from Volusia and Flagler counties, as well as two K-9 officers (police dogs).

== See also ==
- Capital punishment in Florida
- List of death row inmates in the United States § Florida
