= Arawak Jah =

Cuban-American reggae group

Arawak Jah is a Cuban-American reggae group based in Orlando, Florida. The group was founded in 1994 by Cuban expatriate Ras Juan Perez (born 8 February 1960 in La Habana), who left Havana in 1980 during the Mariel boatlift, living first in Wisconsin, then moving to Orlando in 2000.

In 1995, while being based in Madison, Wisconsin, the band released its self-titled debut. The band was the last reggae band to play the music venue Club de Wash before it was destroyed in a 1996 fire.

Members of the band, in addition to the singer-songwriter and keyboardist Ras Juan Perez, have included drummer Pete Johnson & Vincent Davis; bassist Phil Meier & Demetrius Wainright; guitarist Mark Xavier & Steve Caddle to mention some of over a dozen of hired musician and guests through the 14 years of the band life.

Further membership changes resulted in a 1997 lineup of Perez, singer-guitarist Bobby Aleman, drummer Willie Wilson and dance hall specialist Super Irie. They were one of the headlining acts of the 1997 Bob Marley Festival Tour.

On the 1996 release King of Salem, the band recorded six songs twice, with each song having one Cuban reggae interpretation and one Jamaican reggae interpretation.

Arawak Jah self-released ten CDs under the Rasta Rumba Record, releasing their most recent album Rasta King in 2008.

The band has its own recording studio (ARAWAK NGANGA STUDIO) in Kissimmee, FL and its helping local talents to record and guide their music endeavors.

The band has performed along well-known reggae acts like Burning Spear, Shaggy, Culture, Ipso Facto, and Tony Rebel.

Today, the band travels between Cuba and the USA.

== Discography ==
- 1995: It Is Original (cassette)
- 1996: Arawak Jah
- 1996: King of Salem
- 1997: De Cuba con Amor
- 1997: It Is Original (CD re-release)
- 1998: Yo Soy Latino (Version Larga)
- 1999: Arawak Live!
- 2002: Mi Cincerro
- 2002: Yo Soy Latino (Version Corta)
- 2004: Duele
- 2004: Arawak Jah Classics Live!
- 2008: Rasta King
- 2008: No Mercy
- 2008: No Me Digan Feo
