= Committees for the Defense of the Revolution =

Network of neighborhood committees across Cuba

- Comités de Defensa de la Revolución
- CDR emblem

Agency overview
- Formed: 28 September 1960; 66 years ago
- Jurisdiction: Cuba
- Motto: ¡En cada barrio, Revolución! (English: "In every neighborhood, Revolution!")
- Employees: ▲8,400,000

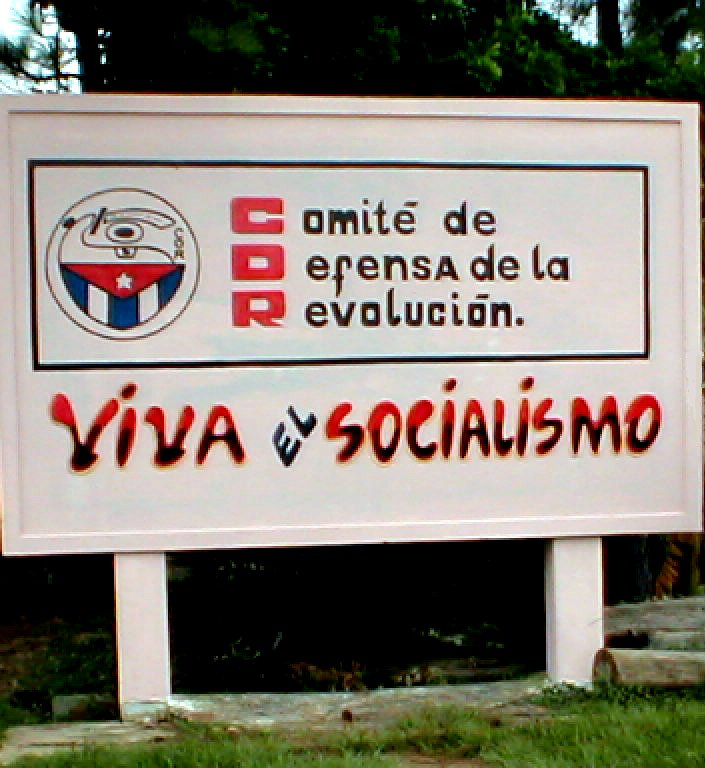
"Long Live Socialism" CDR billboard in countryside on the way from Havana to Pinar del Río.

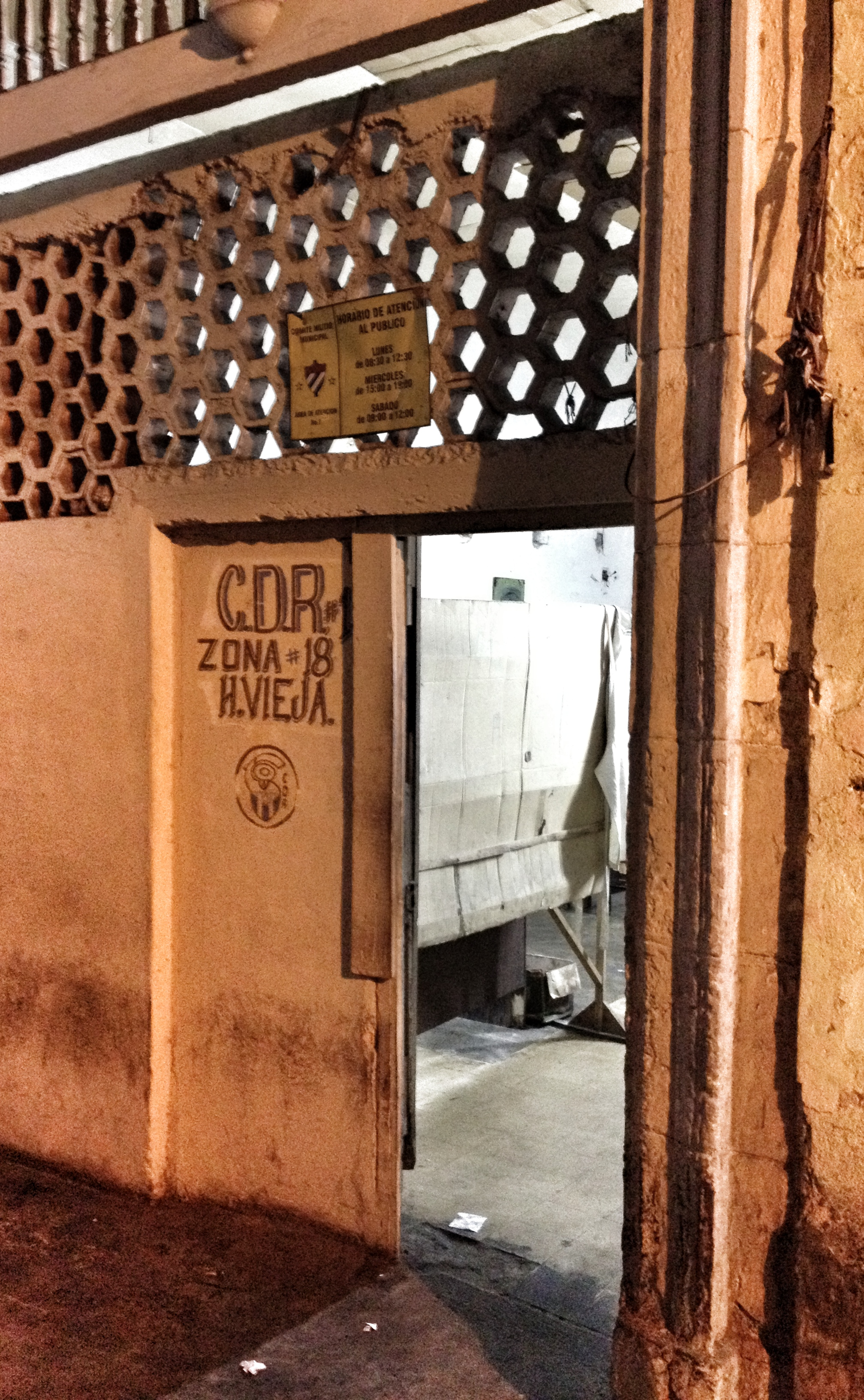
A CDR in Old Havana on Paseo de Martí facing Parque Central

Committees for the Defense of the Revolution (Spanish: Comités de Defensa de la Revolución), or CDR, are a network of neighborhood committees across Cuba. The organizations, described as the "eyes and ears of the Revolution," exist to help support local communities and report on "counter-revolutionary" activity. In 2010, 8.4 million Cubans of the national population of 11.2 million were registered as CDR members.

CDRs provide community services, such as assisting in literacy and vaccination campaigns, but have been criticized for alleged human rights violations.

== History ==
=== Founding ===
Following the success of the Cuban Revolution, claims of "counter-revolutionary" activity filled Havana. There was a popular desire for some form of urban-based civil defence against sabotage particularly after the explosion of the French freighter La Coubre while dockworkers unloaded ammunitions from the ship.

The final impetus for the creation of such a movement came on the evening of September 28, 1960 when bomb blasts erupted on the former steps of the Presidential Palace while Fidel Castro gave a speech. Fidel Castro subsequently declared:

“We’re going to set up a system of collective vigilance; we’re going to set up a system of revolutionary collective vigilance. And then we shall see how the lackeys of imperialism manage to operate in our midst. Because one thing is sure, we have people in all parts of the city; there’s not an apartment building in the city, not a corner, not a block, not a neighborhood, that is not amply represented here [in the audience]. In answer to the imperialist campaigns of aggression, we’re going to set up a system of revolutionary collective vigilance so that everybody will know everybody else on his block, what they do, what relationship they had with the tyranny [the Batista government], what they believe in, what people they meet, what activities they participate in. Because if they [the counterrevolutionaries] think they can stand up to the people, they’re going to be tremendously disappointed. Because we’ll confront them with a committee of revolutionary vigilance on every block... When the masses are organized there isn’t a single imperialist, or a lackey of the imperialists, or anybody who has sold out to the imperialist, who can operate”.

The slogan of the CDR is, "¡En cada barrio, Revolución!" ("In every neighborhood, Revolution!"). Fidel Castro proclaimed it "a collective system of revolutionary vigilance," established "so that everybody knows who lives on every block, what they do on every block, what relations they have had with the tyranny, in what activities are they involved, and with whom they meet."

== Structure ==
=== Enrollment and ranks ===
Joining a committee is not selective. The top leadership of the organization is drawn from a select pool of loyalists at the discretion of the general secretary of the PCC. Each CDR subdivision has an elected president that manages their locale and is subordinate to the CDR president immediately above. Each block president is charged with collecting and centralizing the information about every citizen in their block, giving such information to local police, investigators for political organizations like the Union of Communist Youths or the Communist Party of Cuba or the investigators for the Department of State Security (G2).

Each committee also has one responsible for Vigilance, Ideology, and Community and Service. Those tasked with vigilance write annotations on citizens, monitoring how often people go to their house and how many attend, their whereabouts, family and work history, how many packages they may be receiving or enforcing curfews.

Those in charge of Ideology are tasked with spreading political material to orient the people towards the party and recording overall revolutionary moral character. Those responsible for community and service plan various activities on rest days like maintaining optimal hygienic conditions on the block.

=== Regular meetings ===
Lewis Edgewood, a delegate on an official National Education Union visit to Cuba, describes CDR meetings as political block parties. Members from a local neighborhood meet in the street to give speeches, listen to music, drink, and eat. There are also discussions regarding coordinating local community service and neighborhood surveillance.

== Activities ==
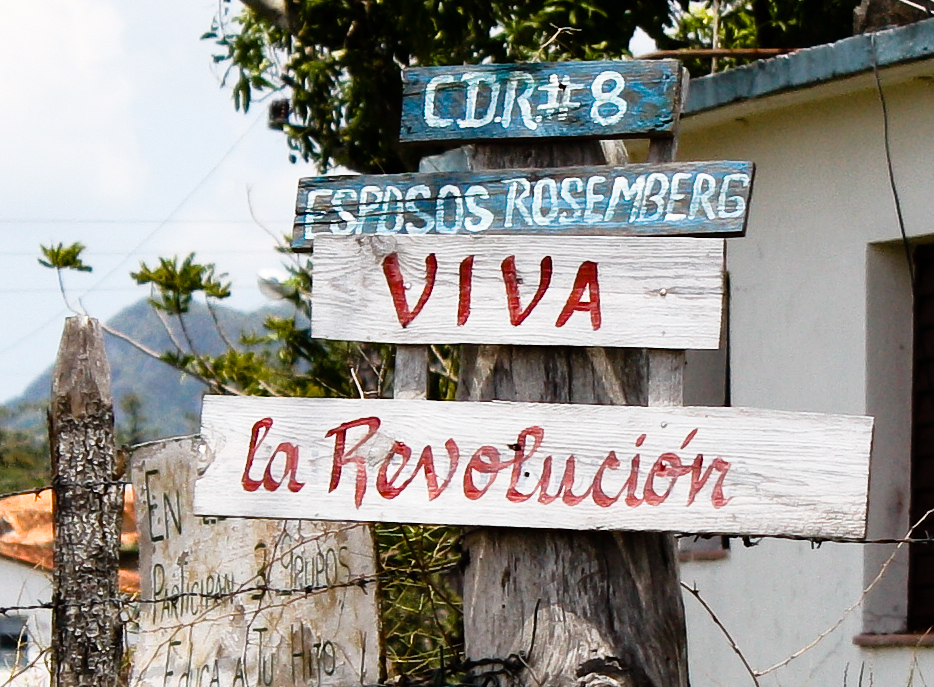
A CDR sign in Pinar del Río

=== Community services ===
The CDRs have a role in national literacy and vaccination campaigns. They maintain social hygiene by eradicating the origins of transmission for certain diseases. They popularly mobilized people for demonstrations for Elian Gonzalez, the “Five Heroes” spies, or the Mariel Boatlift. The CDR play a role in the National Civil Defense by reviewing and updating evacuation plans for their neighbourhoods prior to each hurricane season.

The CDR has responsibilities beyond monitoring individual political and moral backgrounds. These include arranging community festivals, administrating voluntary community projects, and organizing community attendance to mass rallies. Proponents emphasize that CDRs have helped to put medical, educational, or other campaigns into national effect. They act as centers for many who do not work in farms or factories, and hence include a large proportion of female membership. The CDRs take an active role in vaccination campaigns, blood banks, recycling, practicing evacuations for hurricanes, and supporting the government in its fight against corruption.

CDR community centers were mobilized beginning 2020 to help respond to the ongoing COVID-19 pandemic in Cuba.

=== Surveillance and violence ===
A 2006 Amnesty International report alleged CDR involvement in repeated human rights violations, that included verbal and physical violence.

A Country Report submitted by the United States House Committee on Foreign Affairs alleges that "acts of repudiation" are organized by CDRs, the Federation of Cuban Women, the Association of Veterans of the Cuban Revolution, and other official groups. These "acts of repudiation" involved organized crowds targeting dissidents with taunting, property damage, and sometimes physical assault.

Elizardo Sánchez, a Cuban dissident, described the CDR as "a tool for the systematic and mass violation of human rights, for ideological and repressive discrimination. They assist the police and the secret service". Writer and Cuban exile, Carlos Alberto Montaner, describes the CDRs as a mass informant network established by the Ministry of the Interior, that uses social pressure to recruit informants. Informants are organized into local committees, who are headed by broader regional committees, all dedicated to keeping files on local citizens.

In 2013, the Institute for War and Peace Reporting claimed that the CDRs evaluate local people's subversive attitudes and will use reports to bar suspicious people from state jobs, which make up the majority of the Cuban economy.

=== Famed interventions ===
The CDRs have been involved in some significant periods of Cuba's history.

The CDRs were involved in the identification of homosexuals and other "anti-social" elements, who were ordered to Military Units to Aid Production, which were labor camps designed to house "anti-social" people.

The CDRs were also involved in organizing frequent acts of repudiation aimed at emigrants who had elected to leave Cuba through the Mariel boatlift in 1980.

== See also ==
- Social dangerousness in Cuba

International:

- Unofficial collaborator in East Germany
- Colectivo (Venezuela)
- Snitch Law, Venezuela
- Dignity Battalions, Panama

General:

- Mass surveillance
- Neighbourhood watch
