= Mirta Ojito =

Cuban journalist

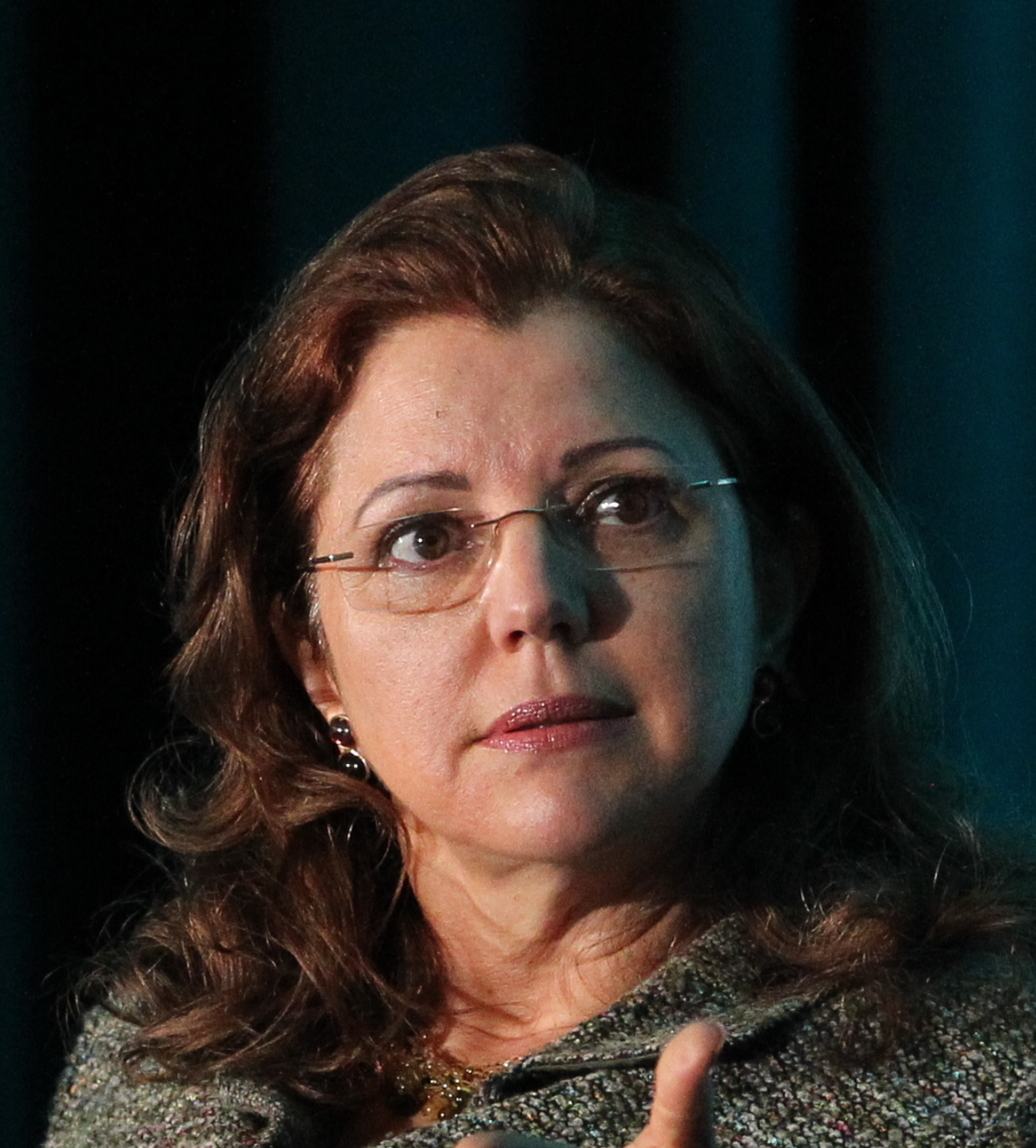
- Mirta Ojito during the Knight Media Forum 2019 in Miami
- Born: Cuba
- Occupations: author and journalist

Mirta Ojito is a Cuban-born author and journalist. She has written two nonfiction books, Finding Mañana: A Memoir of a Cuban Exodus a book about her journey to the U.S. as a teenager in the Mariel boatlift, and Hunting Season: Immigration and Murder in an All-American Town." She was part of a group of New York Times reporters who shared the Pulitzer Prize for national reporting in 2001 for a series of articles about race in America. More recently, she was a member of the Telemundo team that won an Emmy for the coverage of Pope Francis's visit to the Americas.

== Early life ==
Born on February 10, 1964, in Cuba, Ojito was raised in the Santos Suárez neighborhood of Havana. Her parents disliked the Communist regime and always told her one day they would leave Cuba. That day came on May 10, 1980, when Ojito and her family left the island aboard a boat named Mañana, as part of the Mariel boatlift, and arrived in Key West the following the day. The family settled in Miami.

== Education ==
After finishing High School in Miami, Ojito attended Miami Dade College and went on to Florida Atlantic University, graduating in 1986.

== Career ==
In 1987, she started working for The Miami Herald, where she remained for nine years, alternating between that paper and El Nuevo Herald. She became known, primarily, for her coverage of Cuban detainees in federal penitentiaries and stories about human rights in Cuba. In 1996, she started working in the Metro desk of The New York Times, where she covered immigration, among other beats.

In 1998, she returned to Cuba to cover the Pope's visit to the island. A first person story from that trip was nominated for the Pulitzer Prize. She left the paper in January 2002 to write her first book and, four years later, started teaching at Columbia University Graduate School of Journalism, where she became known for her work on immigration. She lectured widely on topics regarding Cuba, immigration and journalism.

In 2014, she joined NBC News, where she is the Senior Director in the NBC News Standards team and works at Telemundo Network. She is a member of the Council on Foreign Relations.

Ojito served as a judge for the 2019 and 2021 American Mosaic Journalism Prize.

== Books ==
- (2006) Finding Mañana: A Memoir of a Cuban Exodus
- Hunting Season: Immigration and Murder in an All-American Town
- Deeper than the Ocean 2025
