= Bernard Giles =

American serial killer and rapist

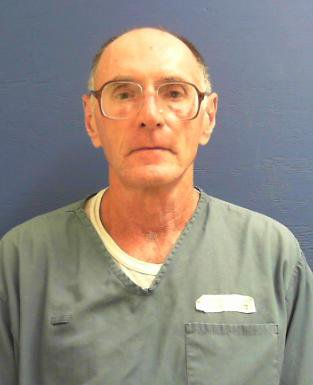
- Born: Bernard Eugene Giles; April 9, 1953 (age 73); Titusville, Florida, U.S.
- Convictions: First degree murder (5 counts); Aggravated assault Armed robbery Escape
- Penalty: Life imprisonment

Details
- Victims: 5
- Span of crimes: September – November 1973
- Country: United States
- State: Florida
- Date apprehended: December 11, 1973
- Imprisoned at: Tomoka Correctional Institution, FL

Bernard Eugene Giles (born April 9, 1953) is an American convicted serial killer and rapist who murdered five girls and women in Titusville, Florida, in late 1973. After his arrest in December of that year, he fully admitted his guilt and was sentenced to serve several life imprisonment terms in 1974.

== Early life ==
Giles was born on April 9, 1953, in a Titusville family with three other children. His parents led a law-abiding lifestyle and were described as not very good at parenting. Most of his friends described him in a very positive manner. He attended Titusville High School, where he took an interest in visual arts. He achieved some success in this field, but soon lost interest in studying as a whole. Due to chronic absenteeism and poor academic performance, he was forced to leave school at age 16. He then mastered the trade of an electrician and began working. In 1972, he married 17-year-old Leslie Jo Ann, who gave birth to a daughter in July 1973.

== Murders ==
As victims, Giles would choose young girls, most of whom hitchhiked. Their bodies were found, in some cases raped, in orange groves or wooded areas in Brevard County.

Nancy Gerry, 18, disappeared on September 26, 1973. Her fully clothed body was found in a palmetto thicket, shot in the head, on December 10, 1973.

Sharon Mary Wimer, 14, disappeared on November 5, 1973. She was found strangled, wearing only a St. Christopher's necklace; her shirt and sweater were found near her remains.

Krista Jean Melton, 14, was reported missing on November 14, 1973. On January 31, 1974, she was found fully clothed with a gunshot to the head.

Carolyn Jan Bennett, 17, disappeared on November 15, 1973. Her skeleton was found on Christmas Day. She had been shot in the head.

Paula Darlene Hamric, 22, disappeared November 17, 1973. Her nude body was found strangled, hands bound, eight days later.

== Arrest ==
On December 10, 1973, Giles lured two underage hitchhikers into his car and drove them to the woodlands outside Titusville, where he attempted to attack them. The victims fiercely resisted, which caused Giles to draw his gun to shoot them, but his pistol malfunctioned and misfired, and the girls managed to escape. They went to police and described their attacker and his car, providing even his name, which they had glimpsed in a book while riding in his car. The next day, Giles was arrested, his car was examined, and his 22-caliber pistol was seized. He was charged with assault and attempted rape. Following Giles' arrest, he was investigated as a suspect in the disappearances of more than 11 girls who had been reported missing since August 1973 and the murders of several others, but in January of the following year, most of the missing girls were located, and Giles was no longer suspected in those cases.

== Legal proceedings ==
A forensic ballistic examination confirmed that Gerry had been killed with the revolver belonging to Giles, and he was subsequently charged with her murder. He insisted on his innocence, and in early 1974, his lawyers filed a motion for a forensic medical examination, which was granted. In the spring, two independent examinations were conducted, which determined that Giles did not suffer from any mental illnesses or abnormalities. He was declared sane, and a trial date was scheduled for April 29, 1974.

The Brevard County State Attorney's Office said that if Giles was convicted, they would seek the death penalty. Because of this, Giles made a plea bargain with prosecutors shortly before the beginning of the trial. He confessed to the murder of Hamric; then, during the trial, he pleaded guilty to the murders of the three remaining girls and to a series of non-lethal attacks and attempted murders. Giles admitted that he had been prone to violence from the age of six, often playing games in which he imitated killing the other participant. He claimed to have enjoyed pretend-strangling his childhood friend, who played the role of a witch in one of the games. This was confirmed by a number of acquaintances from that period. According to his testimony, he began to make his first attempts to attack girls in 1969 after dropping out of school but was unsuccessful. Due to the plea bargain terms, he was spared the death penalty and on August 13, 1974, was given several terms of life imprisonment.

== Aftermath ==
After his conviction, Giles was transported to serve his sentence at the Florida State Prison in Bradford County. In October 1979, Giles escaped with two other prisoners. With the help of a few hand-made smoke grenades, he and his accomplices distracted the guard dogs and the prison guards. Then, using locksmithing tools, they managed to make a small gap in several rows of wire through which they escaped. In the subsequent search, police staked out his ex-wife's house as they had received a tip that Giles was planning to kidnap his daughter from his ex-wife. However, he was found five miles away from the prison, 26 hours after escaping. He was found guilty of escape and given an additional 15 years imprisonment.

Since then, Giles has been moved to various penitentiaries around the state. In 2019, he received a second wave of fame after British journalist and TV host Piers Morgan visited Giles in prison to conduct an interview for one of his news segments.

== See also ==
- List of prison escapes
- List of serial killers in the United States
