= Acts of repudiation =

Violence against critics of Cuban government

Acts of repudiation (Spanish: actos de repudio) is a term Cuban authorities use to refer to acts of violence and or humiliation towards critics of the government. These acts occur when large groups of citizens verbally abuse, intimidate and sometimes physically assault and throw stones and other objects at the homes of Cubans who are considered counter-revolutionaries. Human rights groups suspect that these acts are often carried out in collusion with the security forces and sometimes involve the Committees for the Defence of the Revolution or the Rapid Response Brigades.

== History ==
=== Early origins ===
The first instance of something similar to an act of repudiation occurred in 1949 where journalist Alberto Rubiera and other leftist students pelted Spanish poets with rotten food in an "act of repulsion". In the 1950s politicians and intellectuals of various political leanings would be pelted with eggs by their opponents. These acts of political opposition were still uncommon as the governments of Gerardo Machado and Fulgencio Batista more relied on assassinations and torture.

One of the first "acts of repudiation" occurred at the anti-Castro newspaper offices of 'Diario de la Marina' in June 1959. Trucks full of Fidelistas circled the building and began insulting the workers at the newspaper. Journalist Luis Conte Agüero would flee Cuba after being publicly harassed by Fidelistas in 1959. In 1961 he would tour Latin America and give public speeches denouncing the Cuban Revolution only to be shouted down by Castro sympathizers in the audience. Before 1980 the government of Fidel Castro relied more on institutional purges and televised shootings rather than acts of repudiation to solidify political power.

=== Mariel boatlift ===
During the Mariel boatlift the Cuban government ordered acts of repudiation against those who wished to emigrate from Cuba. In these acts mobs would target those deemed disloyal and beat them or force them to march around with an accusatory sign around their necks. These attacks would help solidify the image that those leaving in the boatlift were the undesirables of the island. It is believed at least three Cubans were killed in these mob attacks. The Ministry of Justice organized public beatings and it was considered mandatory for officials to participate.

This campaign of mob attacks would eventually lead certain Cuban officials to question government policies and in the late 1980s attempt to defect to the United States.

=== After the Mariel boatlift ===
In 2006 acts of repudiation saw a drastic increase in Cuba. Fidel Castro would address the increased attacks on dissidents stating "And this is what will happen whenever traitors and mercenaries go a millimeter beyond the point that our revolutionary people . . . are willing to accept".

=== 2000s–11J Protests ===
In the 21st century, acts of repudiation have continued to be a method of public intimidation against dissidents, civil society actors, and family members of political prisoners.

In November 2009, a crowd of government supporters confronted journalist Reinaldo Escobar, the husband of prominent dissident Yoani Sánchez, in Havana, which escalated into widescale mob violence against Escobar. Sánchez herself was also targeted by an act of repudiation during a public speaking appearance in 2013 in New York City after being given government permission to leave Cuba.

The Ladies in White (Damas de Blanco), a movement of female relatives of political prisoners, have frequently been harassed during their weekly marches.

Following the protests of July 11, 2021 (11J), acts of repudiation were carried out against the families of detained demonstrators. In one documented case from November 2021, a group of pro-government civilians gathered outside the home of a protester, shouting slogans and insults in an act of repudiation against his family who spoke in favor of political prisoners.

== Method ==
=== Mob attacks ===
One of the two different methods for "acts of repudiation" began during the Mariel boatlift. Mobs of civilians would attack and insult those wishing to leave with the cooperation of Cuban authorities. Sometimes these attacks would become so chaotic that Cuban authorities would try to quell the violence.

=== CDR intimidation ===
An older model of one of the two different methods for "acts of repudiation" would be organized by the Committees for the Defense of the Revolution and used during the Mariel boatlift. CDR officials would organize neighbors to intimidate or attack other neighbors who they deemed traitors, such as Cubans wishing to emigrate. Methods included crowds shouting at targeted people, egg throwing, homes defaced with insulting graffiti, or very commonly a doll could be hung from a string in front of their house symbolizing a lynching.

== See also ==
- Human rights in Cuba
