= Francisco del Junco =

Cuban-born American serial killer

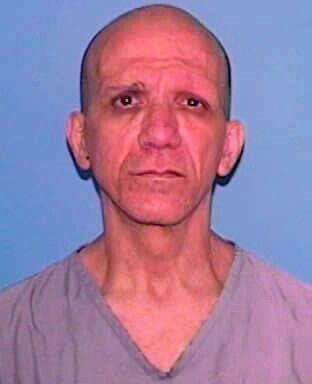
- Mugshot
- Born: August 3, 1957 (age 69); Cuba
- Conviction: First degree murder (4 counts)
- Penalty: Life imprisonment without the possibility of parole

Details
- Victims: 4
- Span of crimes: 1995–1996
- Country: United States
- State: Florida
- Date apprehended: June 3, 1996

Francisco del Junco (born August 3, 1957) is a Cuban-American serial killer who killed and subsequently burned the corpses of four Miami prostitutes during a period of around eight months. Del Junco was convicted of all 4 murders, and given a life sentence for each of them.

== Early life ==
Del Junco, originally from Cuba, was born as the first child into a family with a history of mental illness. His childhood was described as "very tragic", with Francisco being rejected by his peers, coupled with having to take medication for epilepsy since he was 3 years old. Although his father ignored him, Francisco's happiest memories involved going to the beach with his mother.

At age 16, Del Junco began hearing voices and started seeing priestesses conducting black magic, gradually distancing himself from people as he feared somebody was out to kill him. In 1980, he moved to Miami to settle in with some relatives, arriving through the Mariel boatlift. During his time in the States, Del Junco worked several jobs, regularly visited his psychiatrist and was admitted to the Miami Mental Health Clinic a total of three times (in 1987, 1988 and 1992).

== Crimes, capture and trial ==
From 1987 to 1995, he was arrested on several occasions for assaulting an officer, burglary, loitering and theft. Del Junco also did not visit his psychiatrist for a final appointment, but was still given a "guarded" prognosis and was judged as not being a threat to society.

However, from August 1995 to March 1996, a total of four crack cocaine-addicted black prostitutes were beaten up, killed with metal pipes and their bodies burned with gasoline afterwards in Miami's Allapattah neighborhood. They were: Vida Hicks (43), Diane Nelms (44), Cheryl Ray (37) and Janice Cox (37). All of them were lured with the promise of free drugs and sex, with their upper torsos being lit on fire after they were killed.

Following a 10-month investigation by a special task force, Del Junco was arrested, with a container of gasoline and wooden matches in hand, after the authorities were given substantial information by a homeless woman who was beaten up by Francisco, after she had refused to go on a date with him. Forensic tests were carried out, with results matching the size pattern of the accused's combat boots' prints, found on the crime scene. Del Junco himself later confessed to the crimes, explaining in detail how he took his victims to Key Biscayne, away from industrial surroundings, where he would kill them. He described details only the killer could know, thus exonerating a previous suspect only known under the nickname 'Dread'.

At his trial, the Miami-Dade County judge ruled that Francisco del Junco was ineligible for the death penalty due to his mental illness, and was instead given four concurrent life sentences.

== See also ==
- List of serial killers in the United States
